= Ro60-0213 =

Chemical compound

Identifiers
- IUPAC name: (S)-1-(7-methoxyindeno[1,2-b]pyrrol-1(4H)-yl)propan-2-amine
- CAS Number: 170493-66-0
- PubChem CID: 3045239
- ChemSpider: 2308013
- ChEMBL: ChEMBL2114265
- CompTox Dashboard (EPA): DTXSID50168866

Chemical and physical data
- Formula: C_{15}H_{18}N_{2}O
- Molar mass: 242.322 g·mol^{−1}
- 3D model (JSmol): Interactive image
- SMILES: C[C@@H](Cn1ccc2c1-c3cc(ccc3C2)OC)N
- InChI: InChI=1S/C15H18N2O/c1-10(16)9-17-6-5-12-7-11-3-4-13(18-2)8-14(11)15(12)17/h3-6,8,10H,7,9,16H2,1-2H3/t10-/m0/s1; Key:OTCPUISFVUWAGR-JTQLQIEISA-N

Ro60-0213 (Org 35032) is a drug developed by Hoffmann–La Roche, which acts as a potent and selective agonist for the 5-HT_{2C} serotonin receptor, with more than 100x selectivity over other closely related serotonin receptor subtypes, and little or no affinity at other receptors. It was developed as a potential antidepressant, but was discontinued from clinical development at an early stage due to toxicity concerns. However the high selectivity of Ro60-0213 for 5-HT_{2C} makes it of continued interest for research into serotonin receptors.

== See also ==
- 5-MeO-AMT
- AL-34662
- AL-38022A
- Ro60-0175
- VER-3323
- YM-348
