= LSD-Quinoline =

Clinical data
- Drug class: Serotonin receptor agonist; Serotonin 5-HT_{2A} receptor agonist
- ATC code: None

Identifiers
- IUPAC name: (7aR,10R)-N,N-diethyl-8-methyl-7a,8,9,10-tetrahydro-7H-quinolino[7,6,5-de]quinoline-10-carboxamide

Chemical and physical data
- Formula: C_{21}H_{25}N_{3}O
- Molar mass: 335.451 g·mol^{−1}
- 3D model (JSmol): Interactive image
- SMILES: CCN(C([C@@H](C1)C=C2C3=C4C(C[C@@]2([H])N1C)=CC=NC4=CC=C3)=O)CC
- InChI: InChI=1S/C21H25N3O/c1-4-24(5-2)21(25)15-11-17-16-7-6-8-18-20(16)14(9-10-22-18)12-19(17)23(3)13-15/h6-11,15,19H,4-5,12-13H2,1-3H3/t15-,19-/m1/s1; Key:JKMAOHMIUIWQHW-DNVCBOLYSA-N

LSD-Quinoline is a serotonin receptor modulator related to the lysergamide family and to lysergic acid diethylamide (LSD), first synthesised by David E. Olson and colleagues. It acts as a moderately selective serotonin receptor agonist, primarily at the serotonin 5-HT_{2A} receptor, though its activity at other subtypes such as the 5-HT_{2B} and 5-HT_{2C} receptors, and at other targets of LSD such as dopamine receptors, has not been published. It was developed in the course of resarch into non-hallucinogenic psychoplastogens, and is described as having around 24x lower potency than LSD and with "reduced hallucinogenic potential", though this would suggest it may still be of a similar potency to many psychedelic tryptamine derivatives. It has been researched for therapeutic applications including as a potential antidepressant. LSD-Quinoline was first described in the scientific literature by 2026.

== See also ==
- Substituted lysergamide § Related compounds
- JRT (drug)
- Mefloquine
