= Α-Methylisotryptamine =

Monoaminergic drug

α-Methylisotryptamine

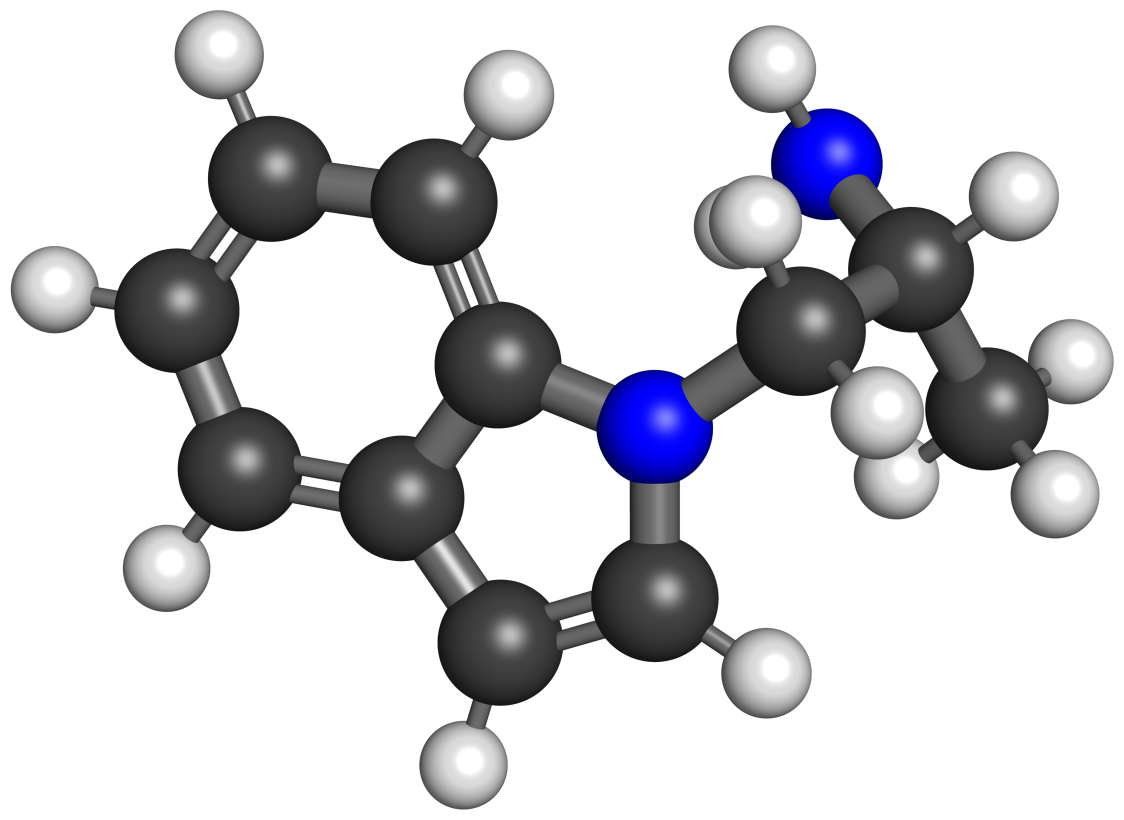

Clinical data
- Other names: isoAMT; iso-αMT; α-Me-isoT; PAL-569; 1-α-Methyltryptamine; 1-(2-Aminopropyl)indole; 1-API; 1-IT; α-Methyl-isotryptamine
- Drug class: Serotonin–norepinephrine releasing agent; Serotonin receptor agonist

Identifiers
- IUPAC name: 1-indol-1-ylpropan-2-amine
- CAS Number: 1227465-67-9
- PubChem CID: 20806570
- ChemSpider: 19644583

Chemical and physical data
- Formula: C_{11}H_{14}N_{2}
- Molar mass: 174.247 g·mol^{−1}
- 3D model (JSmol): Interactive image
- SMILES: CC(CN1C=CC2=CC=CC=C21)N
- InChI: InChI=1S/C11H14N2/c1-9(12)8-13-7-6-10-4-2-3-5-11(10)13/h2-7,9H,8,12H2,1H3; Key:OZPPCCIRSILHOZ-UHFFFAOYSA-N

α-Methylisotryptamine (isoAMT or α-Me-isoT) is a synthetic compound belonging to the isotryptamine family, known for its psychoactive properties. As a structural analogue of α-methyltryptamine (αMT), isoAMT exhibits entactogenic and psychedelic effects.

== Pharmacology ==
α-Methylisotryptamine is a monoamine releasing agent and serotonin receptor agonist of the isotryptamine group. It is the isotryptamine homologue of α-methyltryptamine (αMT), which is a more well-known serotonergic psychedelic, entactogen, and stimulant of the tryptamine family with similar pharmacological actions.

Like αMT, α-methylisotryptamine is a monoamine releasing agent. As the (–)-enantiomer, it specifically acts as a preferential serotonin and norepinephrine releasing agent (SNRA), with EC_{50} values of 177 nM for serotonin release, 81 nM for norepinephrine release, and 1,062 nM for dopamine release. In contrast to amphetamine and similar agents acting as potent and selective dopamine and norepinephrine releasing agents, (–)-α-methylisotryptamine showed no misuse potential in animal studies, including no cocaine-like effects in drug discrimination tests and no facilitation of intracranial self-stimulation (ICSS). In addition to its monoamine release, α-methylisotryptamine shows affinity for serotonin 5-HT_{2} receptors.

== Analogs ==
A derivative of α-methylisotryptamine, zalsupindole (DLX-001; AAZ-A-154; (R)-5-MeO-N,N-dimethyl-isoAMT), is a non-hallucinogenic serotonin 5-HT_{2A} receptor agonist and is being developed for potential medical use in the treatment depression and other neuropsychiatric disorders. Other derivatives of α-methylisotryptamine have also been developed, such as the selective serotonin 5-HT_{2C} receptor agonists (S)-5,6-difluoro-isoAMT and Ro60-0175 ((S)-5-fluoro-6-chloro-isoAMT), among others.

== See also ==
- Substituted isotryptamine
- Substituted tryptamine § Related compounds
- Aminopropylindole
- 1ZP2MA
- isoDMT
- 5-MeO-isoDMT
- 6-MeO-isoDMT
- VER-3323
- 1Z2MAP1O
- 3-APBT
