= SPT-348 =

Clinical data
- Other names: SPT348
- Drug class: Non-hallucinogenic psychoplastogen; Non-selective serotonin receptor modulator; Non-hallucinogenic serotonin 5-HT_{2A} receptor partial agonist
- ATC code: None

SPT-348 is a serotonin receptor modulator and non-hallucinogenic psychoplastogen of the lysergamide family which is under development for the treatment of depression, anxiety, and other neuropsychiatric disorders. It is a prodrug of 2-bromo-LSD (bromolysergide; BOL-148), a non-selective serotonin receptor modulator and partial agonist of the serotonin 5-HT_{2A} receptor, and is an analogue of the serotonergic psychedelic LSD. The drug is said to employ a novel formulation involving a triglyceride linker that helps it to bypass first-pass metabolism in the liver that is said to be prominent with LSD. As of 2025, SPT-348 is in the discovery or preclinical research stage of development.

== See also ==
- List of investigational hallucinogens and entactogens
- Non-hallucinogenic 5-HT_{2A} receptor agonist
- 1P-BOL-148
- JRT
- Lisuride
