= IsoDMT =

Serotonergic drug

isoDMT

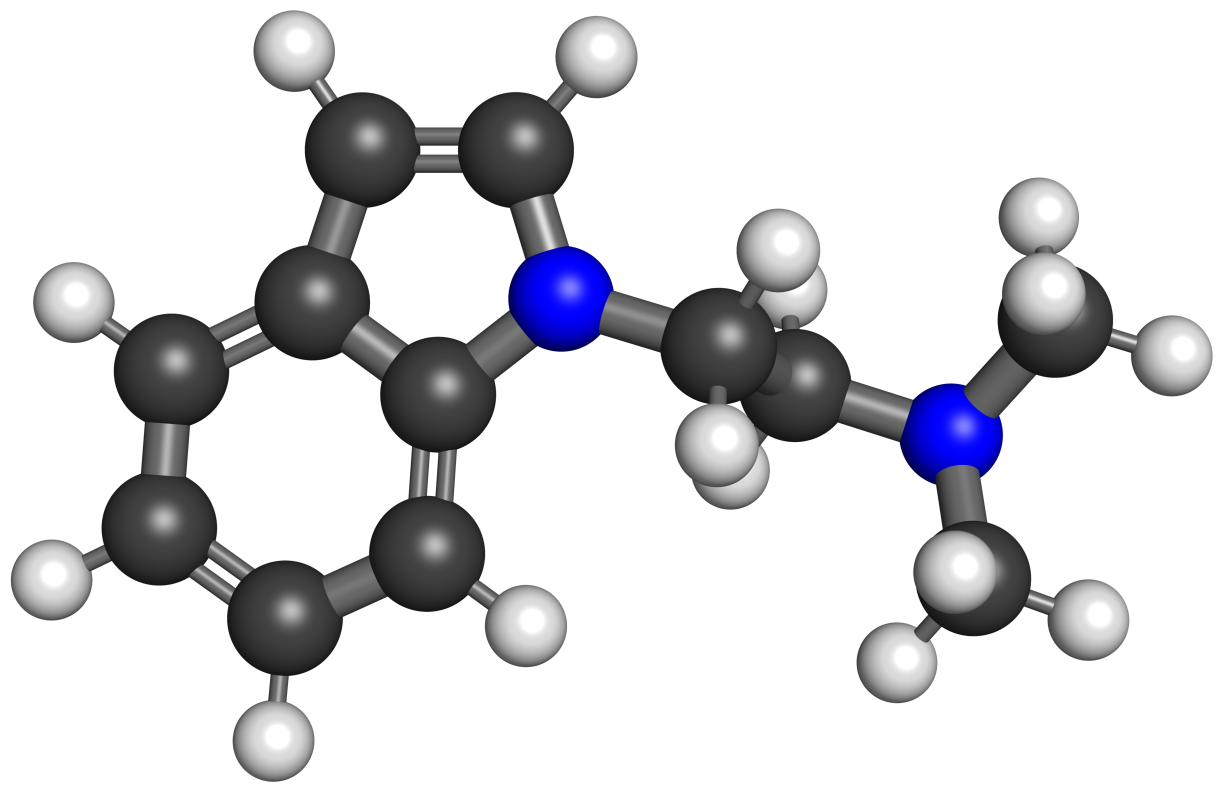

Clinical data
- Other names: iso-DMT; N,N-Dimethylisotryptamine; iso-N,N-DMT; N,N-Dimethylaminoisotryptamine; Dimethylaminoisotryptamine
- Drug class: Non-hallucinogenic serotonin 5-HT_{2A} receptor agonist; Psychoplastogen

Identifiers
- IUPAC name: 2-indol-1-yl-N,N-dimethylethanamine
- CAS Number: 87482-09-5
- PubChem CID: 15893127
- ChemSpider: 11597169
- ChEMBL: ChEMBL38633
- CompTox Dashboard (EPA): DTXSID80579188

Chemical and physical data
- Formula: C_{12}H_{16}N_{2}
- Molar mass: 188.274 g·mol^{−1}
- 3D model (JSmol): Interactive image
- SMILES: CN(C)CCN1C=CC2=CC=CC=C21
- InChI: InChI=1S/C12H16N2/c1-13(2)9-10-14-8-7-11-5-3-4-6-12(11)14/h3-8H,9-10H2,1-2H3; Key:PSHKCPACSIZILK-UHFFFAOYSA-N

isoDMT, also known as N,N-dimethylisotryptamine, is a putatively non-hallucinogenic serotonin 5-HT_{2A} receptor agonist and psychoplastogen of the isotryptamine group. It is the isotryptamine homologue of dimethyltryptamine (DMT), a more well-known serotonergic psychedelic of the tryptamine family, and represents a small structural modification of DMT.

== Pharmacology ==
=== Pharmacodynamics ===
isoDMT does not produce hallucinogen-like stimulus generalization in animal drug discrimination tests and similarly does not produce the head-twitch response, an animal behavioral proxy of psychedelic-like effects. As such, it is not expected to be hallucinogenic in humans. However, isoDMT retains significant activity at the serotonin 5-HT_{2} receptors and shows psychoplastogenic effects comparable to those of serotonergic psychedelics in preclinical research. Its affinities (K_{i}) for the serotonin 5-HT_{2} receptors have been reported to be 600–650 nM for 5-HT_{2A} and 720 nM at 5-HT_{2C}.

== Chemistry ==
=== Analogues ===
Several derivatives of isoDMT have been developed, including the non-hallucinogenic psychoplastogens 5-MeO-isoDMT and zalsupindole (DLX-001; AAZ-A-154; (R)-5-MeO-α-methyl-isoDMT) and the hallucinogen and psychoplastogen 6-MeO-isoDMT. Zalsupindole has shown antidepressant-like effects in animals, thought to be secondary to its psychoplastogenic actions, and is under development for potential medical use to treat neuropsychiatric disorders like depression. Another analogue of isoDMT is α-methylisotryptamine (isoAMT), the isotryptamine homologue of α-methyltryptamine (AMT).

== History ==
isoDMT and its derivatives were first described in the scientific literature by 1984. They were subsequently further characterized in 2020.

== See also ==
- Dimethylaminoethylindole
- Substituted isotryptamine
- Substituted tryptamine § Related compounds
- Non-hallucinogenic 5-HT_{2A} receptor agonist
- 2ZEDMA
- C-DMT
- S-DMT
