= Lysergine =

Ergot alkaloid and serotonin receptor agonist

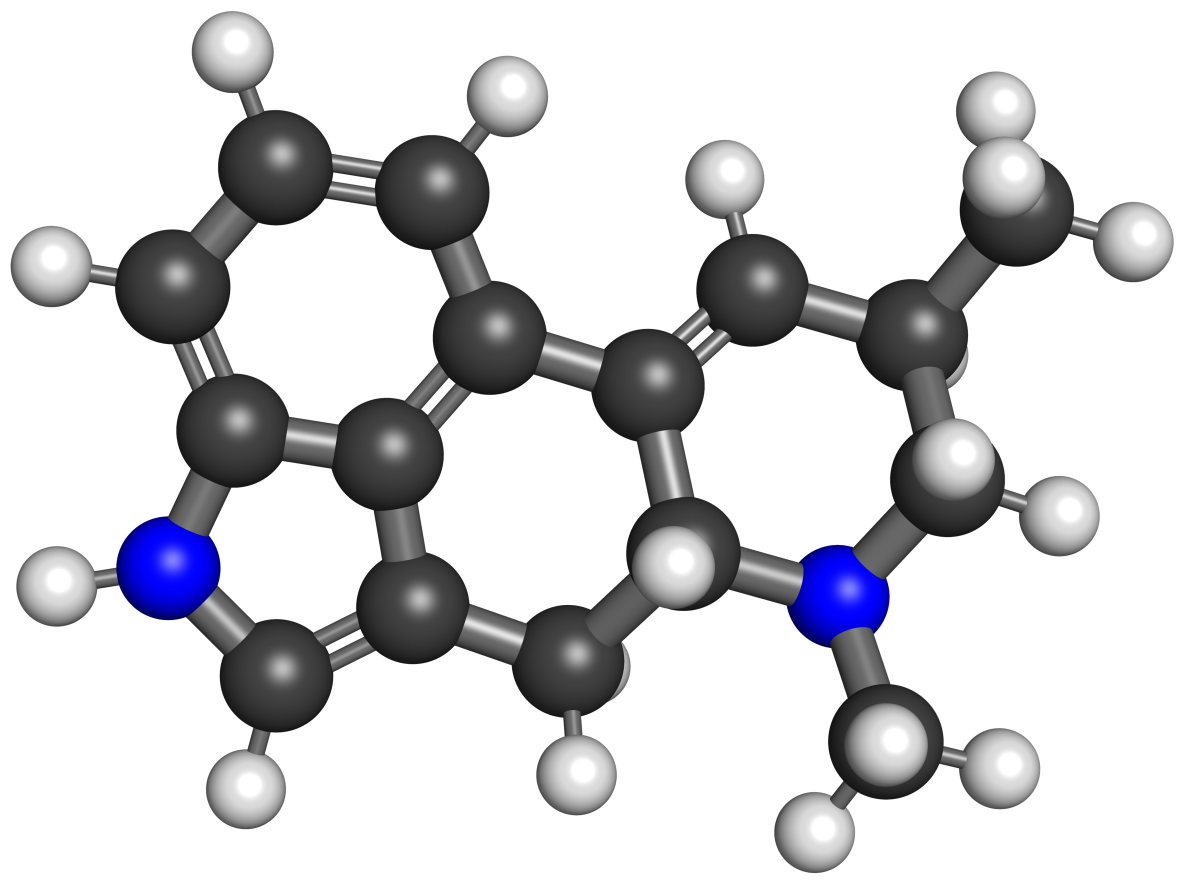

Clinical data
- Other names: 9,10-Didehydro-6,8β-dimethylergoline
- ATC code: None

Identifiers
- IUPAC name: (6aR,9R)-7,9-dimethyl-6,6a,8,9-tetrahydro-4H-indolo[4,3-fg]quinoline
- CAS Number: 519-10-8
- PubChem CID: 12312582
- ChemSpider: 20100727
- UNII: RR1JX77V7F
- ChEMBL: ChEMBL291097
- CompTox Dashboard (EPA): DTXSID10966224

Chemical and physical data
- Formula: C_{16}H_{18}N_{2}
- Molar mass: 238.334 g·mol^{−1}
- 3D model (JSmol): Interactive image
- SMILES: C[C@H]1CN([C@@H]2CC3=CNC4=CC=CC(=C34)C2=C1)C
- InChI: InChI=1S/C16H18N2/c1-10-6-13-12-4-3-5-14-16(12)11(8-17-14)7-15(13)18(2)9-10/h3-6,8,10,15,17H,7,9H2,1-2H3/t10-,15-/m1/s1; Key:YOZGACBWDKFAAD-MEBBXXQBSA-N

Lysergine, also known as 9,10-didehydro-6,8β-dimethylergoline, is an ergot alkaloid and serotonin receptor agonist of the ergoline family. It is a minor constituent of ergot.

== Pharmacology ==
Lysergine shows selectivity for activation of the serotonin 5-HT_{2A} receptor over several other closely related serotonin receptors (54-fold over the 5-HT_{2B} receptor, 38-fold over the 5-HT_{2C} receptor, and 127-fold over the 5-HT_{1A} receptor). The drug is a partial agonist of the 5-HT_{2A} receptor with moderate intrinsic activity (E_{max} = 57%).

Lysergine activation of serotonin receptors
5-HT_{1A}		5-HT_{2A}		5-HT_{2B}		5-HT_{2C}	
EC_{50}	E_{max}	EC_{50}	E_{max}	EC_{50}	E_{max}	EC_{50}	E_{max}
342 ± 23	ND	2.7 ± 1.6	57%	145 ± 54	36%	103 ± 9	42%
Notes: EC_{50} values are nanomolar (nM) and EC_{50} values are mean ± SEM.

An analogue of lysergine, (+)-13-fluorolysergol, is an even more selective agonist of the 5-HT_{2A} receptor than lysergine (EC_{50} for 5-HT_{2B} and 5-HT_{2C} of >10,000 nM). However, this compound has relatively weak maximal efficacy in activating the receptor (E_{max} = 17%).

== Chemistry ==
=== Analogues ===
Isotryptamine or JRT-type analogues of lysergine have been described.

== See also ==
- Descarboxylysergic acid
- Lysergic acid
- Ergine
- Lysergol
- SDZ SER-082
