= C15H20N2 =

The molecular formula C_{15}H_{20}N_{2} (molar mass: 228.33 g/mol, exact mass: 228.1626 u) may refer to:

- Indalpine
- pip-Tryptamine
- SDZ SER-082
