= Delix Therapeutics =

American biotech company

Delix Therapeutics, Inc. ("Delix")
- Company type: Private
- Industry: Pharmaceutical; Biotechnology
- Founded: 2019
- Headquarters: Boston, Massachusetts
- Key people: Mark Rus (Chief Executive Officer)
- Website: delixtherapeutics.com

Delix Therapeutics is an American biotech company based in Boston, Massachusetts. The company develops novel neuroplasticity-promoting therapeutics for central nervous system (CNS) diseases such as depression and post-traumatic stress disorder (PTSD). It was co-founded in 2019 by David E. Olson and Nick Haft.

== Company History ==
The company was founded to develop novel, non-hallucinogenic psychoplastogens, also known as neuroplastogens, to better treat mental health disorders at scale. Nick Haft and David E. Olson founded the company following Olson's discovery that psychedelics are highly potent neuroplasticity-promoting compounds. In September 2021, Delix secured a Series A financing round, the largest in the space, to continue their work focused on neuroplastogens and neuroplasticity therapeutics. Also in Fall of 2021, Delix joined the National Institute on Drug Abuse industry partnering program to screen psychoplastogens in models of substance use disorder. In 2021, the company expanded the leadership team, adding a new CEO, CSO, and CMO

== Awards ==
In 2021, Delix was named one of the Fierce 15 of Biotech. In 2022, Nature named Delix Spinout of the Year and Delix was awarded the Healthcare Businesswomen's Association (HBA) ACE award. In 2023, Delix was a finalist for the Prix Galien award for Best Startup and the BWB award for Biotech Innovation of the Year and won the Biotech Breakthrough Award for Neuroscience Therapeutics Company of the Year.

== Product Candidates ==
To date, the company has synthesized over 2,000 novel psychoplastogens. Many of these small molecule compounds are analogs of known psychedelics such as ibogaine and 5-MeO-DMT. Delix focuses on the development of non-hallucinogenic psychoplastogens as scalable alternatives to first-generation hallucinogenic psychoplastogens like ketamine and psilocybin. Their compounds have been engineered to lack cardiotoxicity and psychostimulant properties characteristic of other first-generation psychoplastogens. The company's known drug candidates include zalsupindole (DLX-001; AAZ-A-154), tabernanthalog (DLX-007), JRT, and DLX-159. Delix has licensed these compounds from UC Davis.

== See also ==
- List of psychedelic pharmaceutical companies
- List of investigational hallucinogens and entactogens
- Psychoplastogen
- Zalsupindole (DLX-001; AAZ-A-154)
- Tabernanthalog (DLX-007)
- DLX-159
- DLX-2270
- DLX-0002700
- (R)-MDDMA
- David E. Olson
