= C14H17N3O =

The molecular formula C_{14}H_{17}N_{3}O (molar mass: 243.30 g/mol, exact mass: 243.1372 u) may refer to:

- Frovatriptan
- YM-348
