= O-Methyl-AL-34662 =

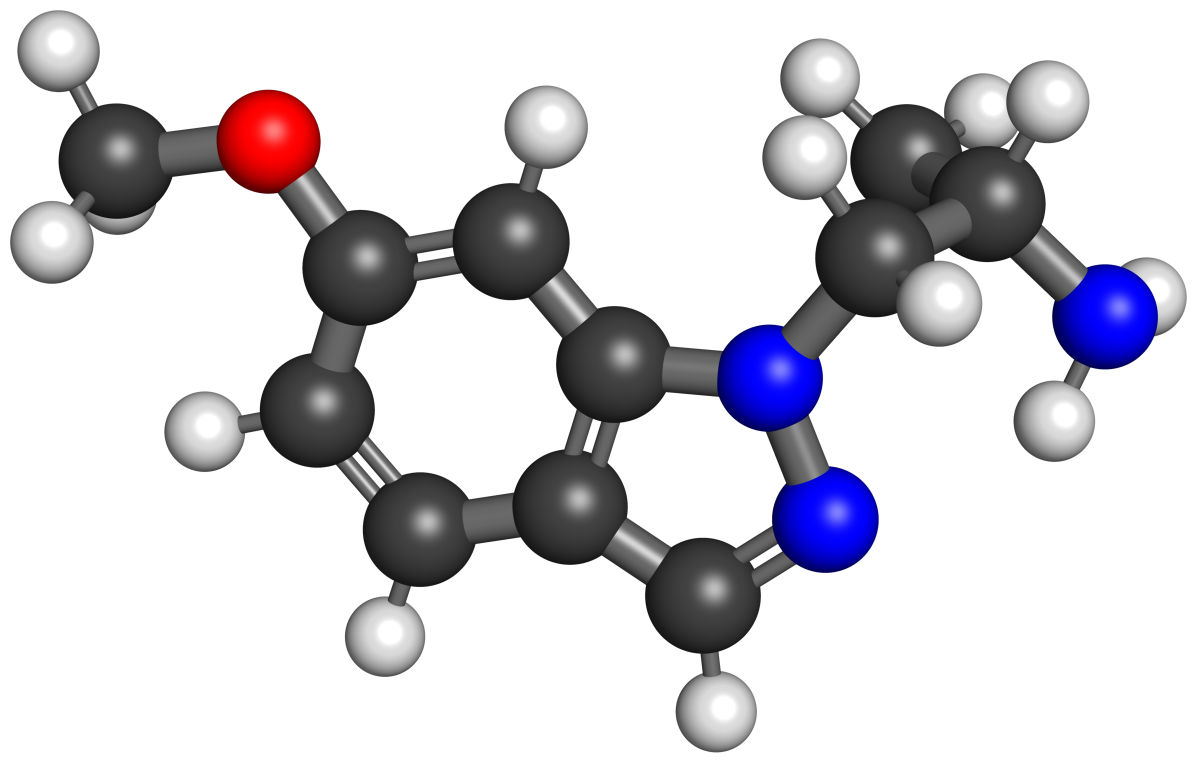

Clinical data
- Other names: Indazole-5-MeO-AMT
- Drug class: Serotonin 5-HT_{2} receptor agonist; Serotonergic psychedelic; Hallucinogen
- ATC code: None

Identifiers
- IUPAC name: (2S)-1-(6-methoxyindazol-1-yl)propan-2-amine
- CAS Number: 210580-60-2
- PubChem CID: 11708275
- ChemSpider: 9882997
- ChEMBL: ChEMBL199775

Chemical and physical data
- Formula: C_{11}H_{15}N_{3}O
- Molar mass: 205.261 g·mol^{−1}
- 3D model (JSmol): Interactive image
- SMILES: C[C@@H](CN1C2=C(C=CC(=C2)OC)C=N1)N
- InChI: InChI=1S/C11H15N3O/c1-8(12)7-14-11-5-10(15-2)4-3-9(11)6-13-14/h3-6,8H,7,12H2,1-2H3/t8-/m0/s1; Key:WSEWULCWBQDNEH-QMMMGPOBSA-N

O-Methyl-AL-34662, also known as indazole-5-MeO-AMT, is a serotonin receptor agonist and putative serotonergic psychedelic of the indazolethylamine family related to the psychedelic tryptamine 5-MeO-AMT. It is an analogue of 5-MeO-AMT in which the indole ring has been replaced with an indazole ring and the active enantiomer has been purified.

The drug is a potent agonist of the serotonin 5-HT_{2} receptors, including of the serotonin 5-HT_{2A}, 5-HT_{2B}, and 5-HT_{2C} receptors. It is a partial to full agonist of the serotonin 5-HT_{2A} receptor and a full agonist of the serotonin 5-HT_{2C} receptor. Both O-methyl-AL-34662 and 5-MeO-AMT showed around 10-fold lower potency as agonists of the serotonin 5-HT_{2A} receptor compared to the serotonin 5-HT_{2B} and 5-HT_{2C} receptors. The drug has roughly the same activational potencies and efficacies at the serotonin 5-HT_{2A}, 5-HT_{2B}, and 5-HT_{2C} receptors as 5-MeO-AMT.

It potently induces the head-twitch response, a behavioral proxy of psychedelic effects, in mice, and hence may have hallucinogenic effects in humans. Its effective dose for induction of the head-twitch response was 0.16 mg/kg, which was about the same as that of (R)-DOI (0.13 mg/kg) and was about 6-fold more potent than 5-MeO-AMT (1.0 mg/kg).

O-Methyl-AL-34662 was first described in the scientific literature by Jesse May and colleagues by 2006.

In contrast to the case of O-methyl-AL-34662, the corresponding "flipped" indazole analogue of 5-MeO-DMT has profoundly reduced potency as a serotonin 5-HT_{2A} receptor agonist relative to 5-MeO-DMT (~1,250-fold lower activational potency).

== See also ==
- Indazolethylamine
- Substituted tryptamine § Related compounds
- AL-34662
- AL-38022A
- YM-348
- VU6067416
