= DLX-2270 =

Chemical compound

Clinical data
- Other names: DLX2270
- Routes of administration: Oral
- Drug class: Serotonin 5-HT_{2A} receptor antagonist; Serotonin 5-HT_{2C} receptor agonist; Antipsychotic; Psychoplastogen
- ATC code: None

DLX-2270 is an experimental serotonin receptor modulator which is under investigation for the potential treatment of schizophrenia.

It acts as a serotonin 5-HT_{2A} receptor antagonist and serotonin 5-HT_{2C} receptor agonist. In contrast to conventional antipsychotics, DLX-2270 is not a dopamine D_{2} receptor antagonist. The drug is orally active and centrally penetrant. In preclinical research, DLX-2270 has psychoplastogenic effects. It reverses hyperlocomotion and social interaction deficits induced by the NMDA receptor antagonist phencyclidine (PCP). In contrast to serotonin 5-HT_{2A} receptor agonists, DLX-2270 does not produce the head-twitch response in rodents, and hence would not be expected to be hallucinogenic in humans.

DLX-0002700.

DLX-2270 was first described in the scientific literature in 2025. It is under development by Delix Therapeutics. The drug has reached the preclinical research stage of development. DLX-2270 is a small molecule, but its chemical structure does not yet appear to have been disclosed. However, Delix Therapeutics has patented dual serotonin 5-HT_{2A} receptor antagonists and serotonin 5-HT_{2C} receptor agonists with psychoplastogenic effects for treatment of psychotic disorders, such as the cyclized isotryptamine and partial ergoline-like DLX-0002700.

== See also ==
- List of investigational hallucinogens and entactogens
- JRT
- Zalsupindole (DLX-001, AAZ-A-154)
- DLX-159
- Tabernanthalog (DLX-007)
- KB-128
