= 13-Fluorolysergol =

Clinical data
- Other names: (13-Fluoro-6-methyl-9,10-didehydroergolin-8β-yl)methanol
- Drug class: Selective serotonin 5-HT_{2A} receptor weak partial agonist or antagonist

Identifiers
- IUPAC name: [(6aR,9R)-2-fluoro-7-methyl-6,6a,8,9-tetrahydro-4H-indolo[4,3-fg]quinolin-9-yl]methanol
- PubChem CID: 132505474

Chemical and physical data
- Formula: C_{16}H_{17}FN_{2}O
- Molar mass: 272.323 g·mol^{−1}
- 3D model (JSmol): Interactive image
- SMILES: CN1C[C@@H](C=C2[C@H]1CC3=CNC4=CC(=CC2=C34)F)CO
- InChI: InChI=1S/C16H17FN2O/c1-19-7-9(8-20)2-12-13-4-11(17)5-14-16(13)10(6-18-14)3-15(12)19/h2,4-6,9,15,18,20H,3,7-8H2,1H3/t9-,15-/m1/s1; Key:UBKCOUCTZVGLJQ-RFAUZJTJSA-N

13-Fluorolysergol, specifically as the (+)-enantiomer (+)-13-fluorolysergol, is a selective serotonin 5-HT_{2A} receptor weak partial agonist or antagonist of the ergoline family. It is highly selective for activation of the serotonin 5-HT_{2A} receptor over the serotonin 5-HT_{2B} and 5-HT_{2C} receptors (EC_{50} = >10,000 nM). (+)-13-Fluorolysergol has relatively weak maximal efficacy in activating the serotonin 5-HT_{2A} receptor (E_{max} = 17%). It is a derivative of lysergol.

== See also ==
- Lysergine
