= Substituted isotryptamine =

Group of chemical compounds

Isotryptamine, the parent compound of the substituted isotryptamines and the simplest isotryptamine.

Substituted isotryptamines, or simply isotryptamines, also known as 2-(1-indolyl)ethylamines, are a group of indoles closely related to the tryptamines but with the ethylamine side chain located at the 1 position of the indole ring system rather than at the 3 position as in tryptamines. Hence, they are positional isomers of tryptamines.

A variety of isotryptamines have been studied and described, including serotonergic psychedelics and psychoplastogens like 6-MeO-isoDMT; non-hallucinogenic psychoplastogens like isoDMT, 5-MeO-isoDMT, and zalsupindole (DLX-001; AAZ-A-154); serotonin 5-HT_{2C} receptor agonists like (S)-5,6-difluoro-isoAMT, Ro60-0175 ((S)-5-fluoro-6-chloro-isoAMT), and PNU-181731; serotonin 5-HT_{6} receptor modulators; and dual monoamine releasing agents and serotonin receptor agonists like isoAMT (PAL-569).

JRT is the isotryptamine analogue of LSD and may be considered a cyclized isotryptamine.

Chemical structures of selected isotryptamines
Isotryptamine

isoDMT

6-MeO-isoDMT

5-MeO-isoDMT

isoAMT

Zalsupindole

Ro60-0175

(S)-5,6-Difluoro-isoAMT

PNU-181731

JRT

DLX-0002700

== See also ==
- Substituted tryptamine
- Non-hallucinogenic 5-HT_{2A} receptor agonist
