= Indazolethylamine =

Class of chemical compounds

Indazolethylamines, or indazolylethylamines, are a group of indazole derivatives closely related to the tryptamines (indolylethylamines). Examples include the simple indazolethylamines AL-34662 and O-methyl-AL-34662 and the cyclized indazolethylamines AL-38022A, VU6067416, and YM-348. These indazolethylamines are known to act as serotonin 5-HT_{2} receptor agonists. Some of them, such as O-methyl-AL-34662 and AL-38022A, have been shown to produce psychedelic-like effects in animals similarly to tryptamines.

Chemical structures of selected indazolethylamines
AL-34662

O-Methyl-AL-34662

AL-38022A

YM-348

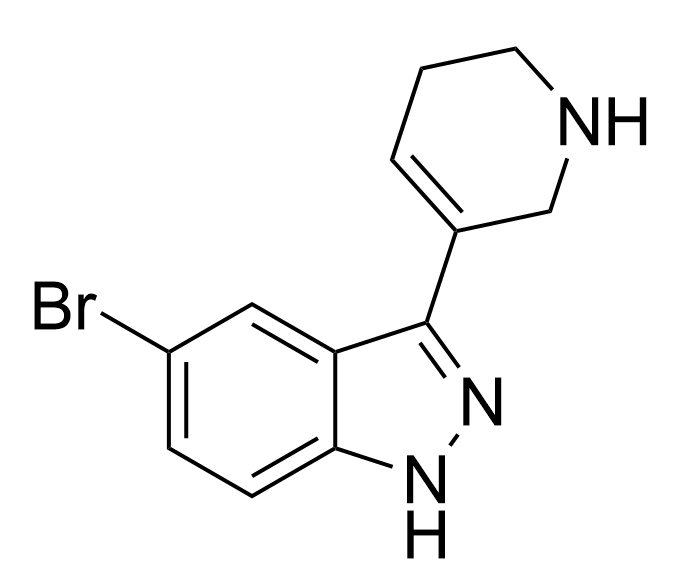
VU6067416

== See also ==
- Substituted tryptamine § Related compounds
- Cyclized tryptamine
- Indolizinylethylamine
- Tetrahydropyridinylpyrrolopyridine
