= JRT (drug) =

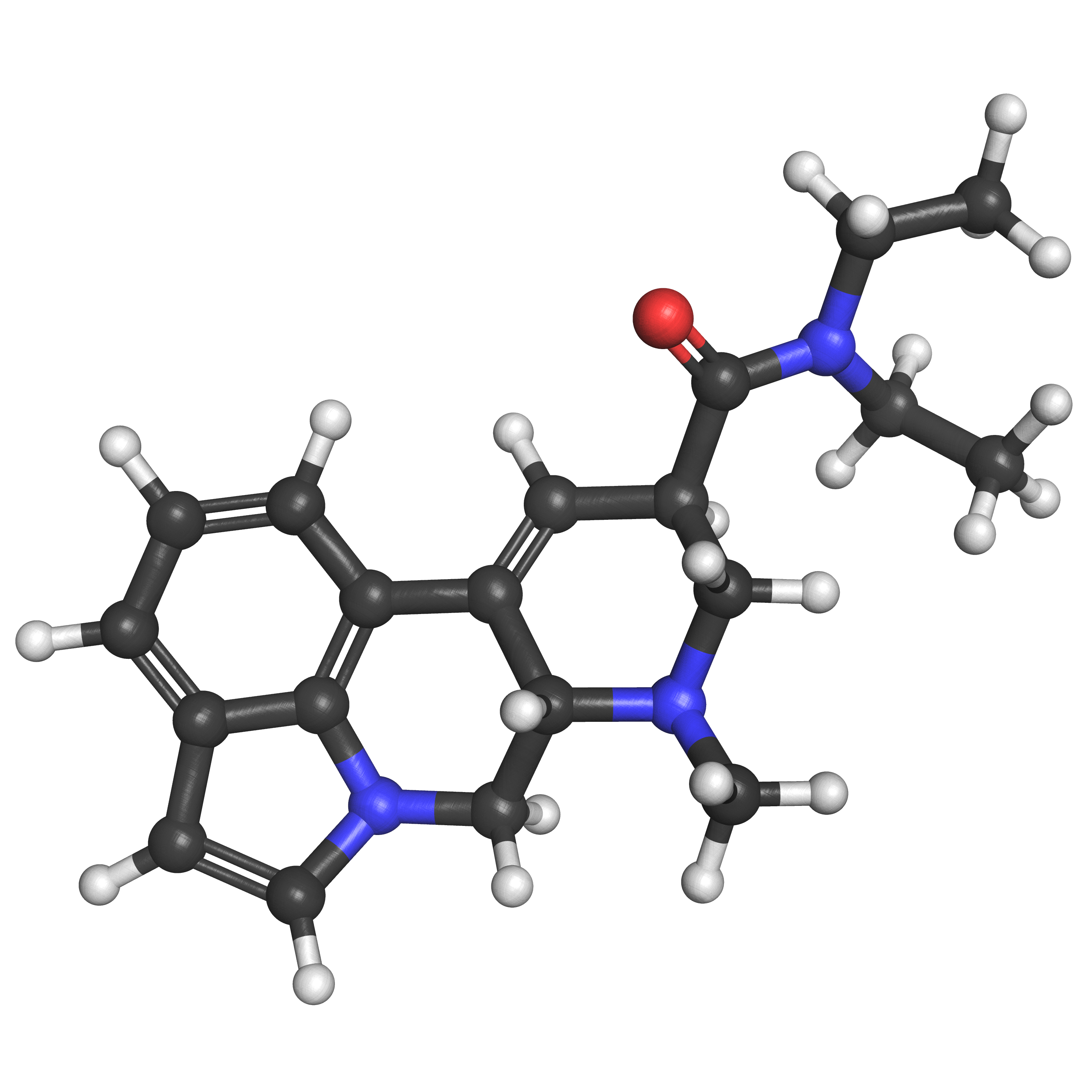
- Above: JRT molecular structure Below: 3D representation of a (+)-JRT molecule

Clinical data
- Other names: Isotryptamine-LSD
- Drug class: Serotonin receptor modulator; Serotonin 5-HT_{2} receptor agonist; Serotonergic psychedelic; Hallucinogen; Psychoplastogen
- ATC code: None

Identifiers
- IUPAC name: (7S)-N,N-diethyl-6-methyl-6,9-diazatetracyclo[7.6.1.0^{2,7}.0^{12,16}]hexadeca-1(15),2,10,12(16),13-pentaene-4-carboxamide
- PubChem CID: 166076087; (+)-JRT: 166076075

Chemical and physical data
- Formula: C_{20}H_{25}N_{3}O
- Molar mass: 323.440 g·mol^{−1}
- 3D model (JSmol): Interactive image; (+)-JRT: Interactive image
- SMILES: CCN(CC)C(=O)C1CN([C@@H]2CN3C=CC4=C3C(=CC=C4)C2=C1)C; (+)-JRT: CCN(CC)C(=O)[C@H]1CN([C@@H]2CN3C=CC4=C3C(=CC=C4)C2=C1)C
- InChI: InChI=1S/C20H25N3O/c1-4-22(5-2)20(24)15-11-17-16-8-6-7-14-9-10-23(19(14)16)13-18(17)21(3)12-15/h6-11,15,18H,4-5,12-13H2,1-3H3/t15?,18-/m1/s1; Key:ZYTVEPYZRGXVRK-KPMSDPLLSA-N; (+)-JRT: InChI=1S/C20H25N3O/c1-4-22(5-2)20(24)15-11-17-16-8-6-7-14-9-10-23(19(14)16)13-18(17)21(3)12-15/h6-11,15,18H,4-5,12-13H2,1-3H3/t15-,18-/m1/s1; Key:ZYTVEPYZRGXVRK-CRAIPNDOSA-N

JRT, also known as isotryptamine-LSD, is a serotonin receptor modulator, psychoplastogen, and serotonergic psychedelic related to lysergic acid diethylamide (LSD). It is the analogue of LSD in which the embedded tryptamine structure within the ergoline ring system of LSD has been replaced with an isotryptamine structure.

The drug acts as a non-selective serotonin receptor modulator, including as a partial agonist of the serotonin 5-HT_{2A} receptor and as an agonist or antagonist of various other serotonin receptors. The drug has psychedelic-like, psychoplastogenic, antipsychotic-like, antidepressant-like, and pro-cognitive effects in animals and preclinical studies, whilst lacking apparent pro-psychotic-like effects. It has significant but reduced psychedelic-like effects compared to LSD in animals. The drug is a racemic mixture of (+)- and (–)- enantiomers, with (+)-JRT being the active and employed form.

JRT was first described in the scientific literature by 2022 and was described in greater detail in 2025. It was developed by David E. Olson and colleagues in association with Delix Therapeutics. The drug is being investigated as a possible treatment for schizophrenia.

== Use and effects ==
The properties and effects of JRT in humans do not yet appear to be known.

== Pharmacology ==
=== Pharmacodynamics ===
(+)-JRT is highly selective for a subset of serotonin receptors and does not bind to various dopamine, adrenergic, or histamine receptors, which is in contrast to LSD. It shows high affinity for the serotonin 5-HT_{2} receptors, with K_{i} values ranging from 2.0 to 184 nM. The drug is a potent partial agonist of the serotonin 5-HT_{2A} and 5-HT_{2B} receptors (E_{max} = 33–81% and 48–51%, respectively) and a full agonist of the serotonin 5-HT_{2C} receptor (E_{max} = 89%). It is also an agonist of the serotonin 5-HT_{1A} and 5-HT_{7} receptors, an antagonist of the serotonin 5-HT_{5A} and 5-HT_{7} receptors, and a ligand of the serotonin 5-HT_{6} receptor. (+)-JRT does not have significant affinity for the serotonin 5-HT_{1B} or 5-HT_{3} receptors, whereas its affinities for the other serotonin 5-HT_{1} receptors and the serotonin 5-HT_{4} receptor were not reported.

The drug is 4.4- to 180-fold less potent than LSD as a serotonin 5-HT_{2A} receptor agonist in vitro (EC_{50} = 0.4–90 nM vs. 0.09–0.5 nM, respectively) and is less efficacious than LSD in activating the receptor (E_{max} = 33% vs. 44–63%, respectively). It has been found to dissociate from the serotonin 5-HT_{2A} receptor approximately 10-fold more quickly than LSD.

(+)-JRT produces the head-twitch response (HTR), a behavioral proxy of psychedelic effects, in rodents, and hence would be expected to be hallucinogenic in humans. However, the drug shows a reduced HTR compared to LSD, producing less than half the maximal number of head twitches. It can also antagonize or diminish the HTR induced by LSD. Hence, (+)-JRT may be less psychedelic than LSD in humans. LSD and (+)-JRT are of similar potency in producing the HTR, with a maximal HTR being achieved at a dose of 0.2 mg/kg for both drugs.

(+)-JRT does not affect locomotor activity and does not produce any serotonin behavioral syndrome-type effects. It has been found to inhibit dextroamphetamine-induced hyperlocomotion in female but not male mice, to not exacerbate phencyclidine (PCP)-induced hyperlocomotion, to not worsen dizocilpine (MK-801)-induced prepulse inhibition (PPI), and to not induce PPI deficits itself. Some of these findings are in contrast to results with LSD, and are suggestive that (+)-JRT lacks psychotic-like effects and may have antipsychotic potential.

In addition to its other effects, (+)-JRT has been reported to increase neuroplasticity and hence to act as a psychoplastogen, to produce antidepressant-like effects, and to promote cognitive flexibility. It was equivalent with LSD in terms of producing psychoplastogenic effects.

== Chemistry ==
(+)-JRT structure.

JRT is the analogue of the lysergamide lysergic acid diethylamide (LSD) in which the embedded tryptamine structure within the ergoline ring system of LSD has been replaced with an isotryptamine structure. Hence, JRT is not an ergoline, lysergamide, or tryptamine itself, but could be considered a cyclized isotryptamine. JRT exists as four enantiomers, including (+)-JRT and (–)-JRT, with (+)-JRT being the active enantiomer and the form used in scientific research.

== History ==
JRT was developed by Jeremy R. Tuck (J.R.T.), Lee E. Dunlap, David E. Olson, and other colleagues at Delix Therapeutics and the University of California, Davis. It was first described in the scientific literature by 2022 and was subsequently described in greater detail in 2025.

== Society and culture ==
=== Legal status ===
==== Canada ====
JRT is not a controlled substance in Canada.

==== United States ====
JRT is not an explicitly controlled substance in the United States. However, it could be considered a controlled substance under the Federal Analogue Act if intended for human consumption.

== Research ==
JRT is being investigated as a possible treatment for schizophrenia. According to David E. Olson, his laboratory is also evaluating JRT in additional therapeutic indications, optimizing its synthesis, and developing further analogues of JRT with potentially improved properties.

== See also ==
- Lysergamide § Related compounds
- Substituted isotryptamine
- List of investigational hallucinogens and entactogens
- List of miscellaneous 5-HT_{2A} receptor agonists
- Non-hallucinogenic 5-HT_{2A} receptor agonist
- BOL-148 (2-bromo-LSD) and SPT-348
- SDZ SER-082
- DLX-0002700
- LEK-8829
- LSD-Quinoline
