= Ro60-0175 =

Chemical compound

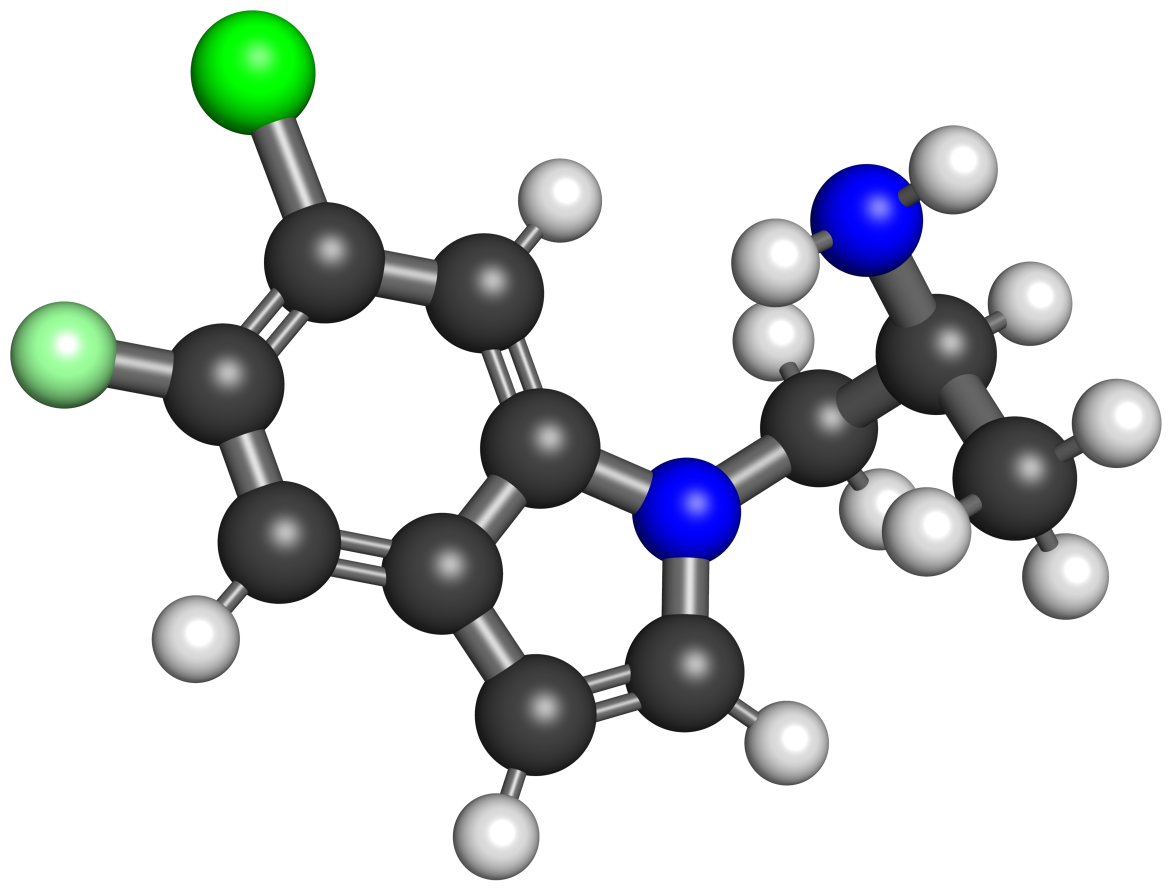

Clinical data
- Other names: Ro-60-0175; Ro-600175; Ro600175; RO-600175; (S)-5-Fluoro-6-chloro-α-methylisotryptamine; (S)-5-F-6-Cl-isoAMT
- Drug class: Serotonin 5-HT_{2} receptor agonist
- ATC code: None

Identifiers
- IUPAC name: (2S)-1-(6-chloro-5-fluoroindol-1-yl)propan-2-amine
- CAS Number: 169675-09-6
- PubChem CID: 3045227
- IUPHAR/BPS: 274
- ChemSpider: 2308002
- UNII: YQP8J4N96A
- ChEBI: CHEBI:142183
- ChEMBL: ChEMBL76781
- CompTox Dashboard (EPA): DTXSID801028190
- ECHA InfoCard: 100.189.524

Chemical and physical data
- Formula: C_{11}H_{12}ClFN_{2}
- Molar mass: 226.68 g·mol^{−1}
- 3D model (JSmol): Interactive image
- SMILES: C[C@@H](CN1C=CC2=CC(=C(C=C21)Cl)F)N
- InChI: InChI=1S/C11H12ClFN2/c1-7(14)6-15-3-2-8-4-10(13)9(12)5-11(8)15/h2-5,7H,6,14H2,1H3/t7-/m0/s1; Key:XJJZQXUGLLXTHO-ZETCQYMHSA-N

Ro60-0175, or Ro-600175, also known as (S)-5-fluoro-6-chloro-α-methylisotryptamine ((S)-5-F-6-Cl-isoAMT), is a serotonin 5-HT_{2} receptor agonist of the isotryptamine family developed by Hoffmann–La Roche, which has applications in scientific research. It is the enantiopure (S)- isomer of the 5-fluoro and 6-chloro derivative of α-methylisotryptamine (isoAMT).

It acts as a potent and selective agonist of both the serotonin 5-HT_{2B} and 5-HT_{2C} receptor subtypes, with good selectivity over the closely related serotonin 5-HT_{2A} subtype, and little or no affinity at other receptors. However, Ro60-0175 also activates the serotonin 5-HT_{2A} receptor less potently than the serotonin 5-HT_{2B} and 5-HT_{2C} receptors. Its EC_{50} and E_{max} values have been found to be 0.91–2.4 nM (79–130%) at the serotonin 5-HT_{2B} receptor, 32–52 nM (84–88%) at the serotonin 5-HT_{2C} receptor, and 400–447 nM (69–91%) at the serotonin 5-HT_{2A} receptor.

The drug has been found to produce hypolocomotion and sedative-like effects, antidepressant-like effects, anxiolytic-like effects or no change in anxiety-like responses, anti-obsessive-like effects, antipsychotic-like effects, appetite suppression, and penile erections in rodent animal studies. It fully generalizes with the preferential serotonin 5-HT_{2C} receptor agonist meta-chlorophenylpiperazine (mCPP) in rodent drug discrimination tests, which can be blocked by the selective serotonin 5-HT_{2C} receptor antagonist SB-242084. Ro60-0175 also generalizes with the selective serotonin reuptake inhibitor (SSRI) citalopram in rodent drug discrimination tests, which can likewise be blocked by SB-242084, suggesting a major role for the serotonin 5-HT_{2C} receptor in the interoceptive effects of SSRIs. The drug has been found to inhibit dopaminergic signaling in the mesolimbic pathway.

Ro60-0175 does not induce the head-twitch response, a behavioral proxy of psychedelic effects, when administered alone in rodents. In addition, it suppresses the head-twitch response induced by the psychedelic drug (R)-DOI. However, in combination with the selective serotonin 5-HT_{2C} receptor antagonist SB-242084, Ro60-0175 robustly induces the head-twitch response. This effect is abolished by addition of the selective serotonin 5-HT_{2A} receptor antagonist ketanserin or volinanserin. The preceding findings suggest that Ro60-0175 may be a serotonergic psychedelic and may have hallucinogenic effects in humans at sufficiently high doses or in combination with a serotonin 5-HT_{2C} receptor antagonist.

The drug was first described in the scientific literature by 1996. It was under development by Roche for the treatment of major depressive disorder (MDD), anxiety disorders, and obsessive–compulsive disorder (OCD), and reached the preclinical research stage of development, but development was discontinued in 1997.

== See also ==
- Substituted isotryptamine
- Substituted tryptamine § Related compounds
- AL-34662
- AL-38022A
- Ro60-0213
- VER-3323
- YM-348
