= Descarboxylysergic acid =

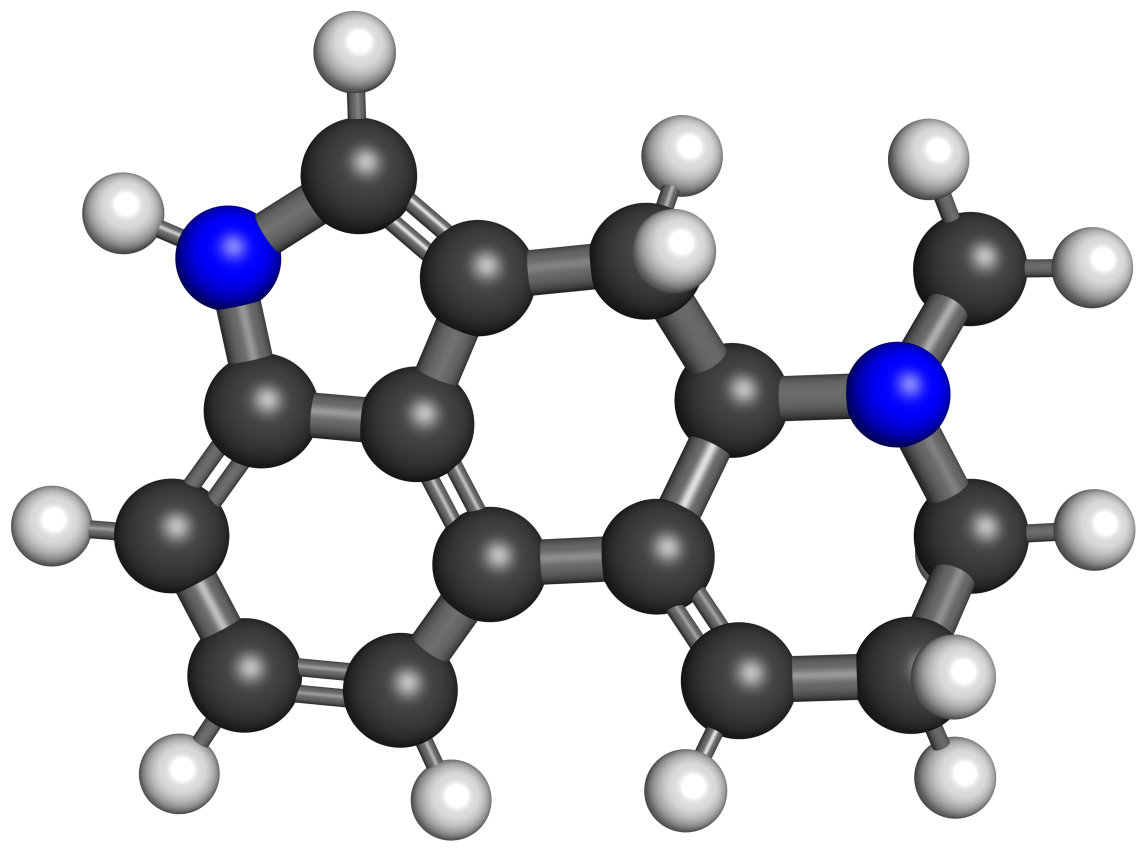

Clinical data
- Other names: 8-Descarboxylysergic acid; Descarboxyllysergic acid; DCLA; 9,10-Didehydro-6-methylergoline; 6-Methyl-9,10-didehydroergoline; 6-Methyl-9-ergolene
- Drug class: Simplified/partial LSD analogue

Identifiers
- IUPAC name: (6aR)-7-methyl-6,6a,8,9-tetrahydro-4H-indolo[4,3-fg]quinoline
- CAS Number: 51867-17-5
- PubChem CID: 191210
- ChemSpider: 166049
- CompTox Dashboard (EPA): DTXSID00966197

Chemical and physical data
- Formula: C_{15}H_{16}N_{2}
- Molar mass: 224.307 g·mol^{−1}
- 3D model (JSmol): Interactive image
- SMILES: CN1CCC=C2[C@H]1CC3=CNC4=CC=CC2=C34
- InChI: InChI=1S/C15H16N2/c1-17-7-3-5-11-12-4-2-6-13-15(12)10(9-16-13)8-14(11)17/h2,4-6,9,14,16H,3,7-8H2,1H3/t14-/m1/s1; Key:AHFZNJIKXMBLTJ-CQSZACIVSA-N

Descarboxylysergic acid (DCLA), or 8-descarboxylysergic acid, also known as 9,10-didehydro-6-methylergoline or as 6-methyl-9-ergolene, is a drug of the ergoline and partial lysergamide families related to lysergic acid and lysergamides like lysergic acid diethylamide (LSD). It is the analogue of lysergic acid in which the carboxyl group at the C8 position of the molecule has been removed. DCLA was synthesized in an attempt to help elucidate the minimum structural requirements for biological activity of ergoline and lysergamide drugs like LSD.

== Pharmacology ==
=== Pharmacodynamics ===
In contrast to lysergic acid, which was said to have "very unexceptional biological activity", DCLA was, surprisingly, found to produce effects in mice that were described as remarkably similar to those of LSD. However, it was said that the specific tests performed were not reliably indicative of hallucinogenic effects in humans. Moreover, no other assays of hallucinogen-type effects were carried out, and DCLA is not known to have been tested in humans. Subsequent research by David E. Nichols found that DCLA did not show LSD-like effects in animal drug discrimination tests. According to Nichols, the simplest ergoline with definite known psychoactive effects in humans is the lysergamide lysergic acid amide (LSA; ergine).

DCLA showed effects in preclinical research suggestive of serotonergic, adrenergic, and dopaminergic activities, for instance prolactin inhibition, oxytocic, and sympatholytic effects. Although DCLA was significantly less potent than certain other ergolines like LSD and ergonine, it was said to still show high biological activity, comparable to drugs like ergonovine and methysergide. As a result, it has been concluded that the 8-position side chain is non-essential for activity, though it does appear to be required for extremely high potency as in drugs like LSD.

== Chemistry ==
=== Synthesis ===
The chemical synthesis of DCLA has been described.

== History ==
DCLA was first synthesized and described by Bach, Hall, and Kornfeld in 1974. It was subsequently studied by David E. Nichols and Robert Oberlender in the 1980s.

== See also ==
- Partial lysergamide
- Lysergine
- Lysergol
- RU-28306
- RU-29717
