= AL-34662 =

Chemical compound

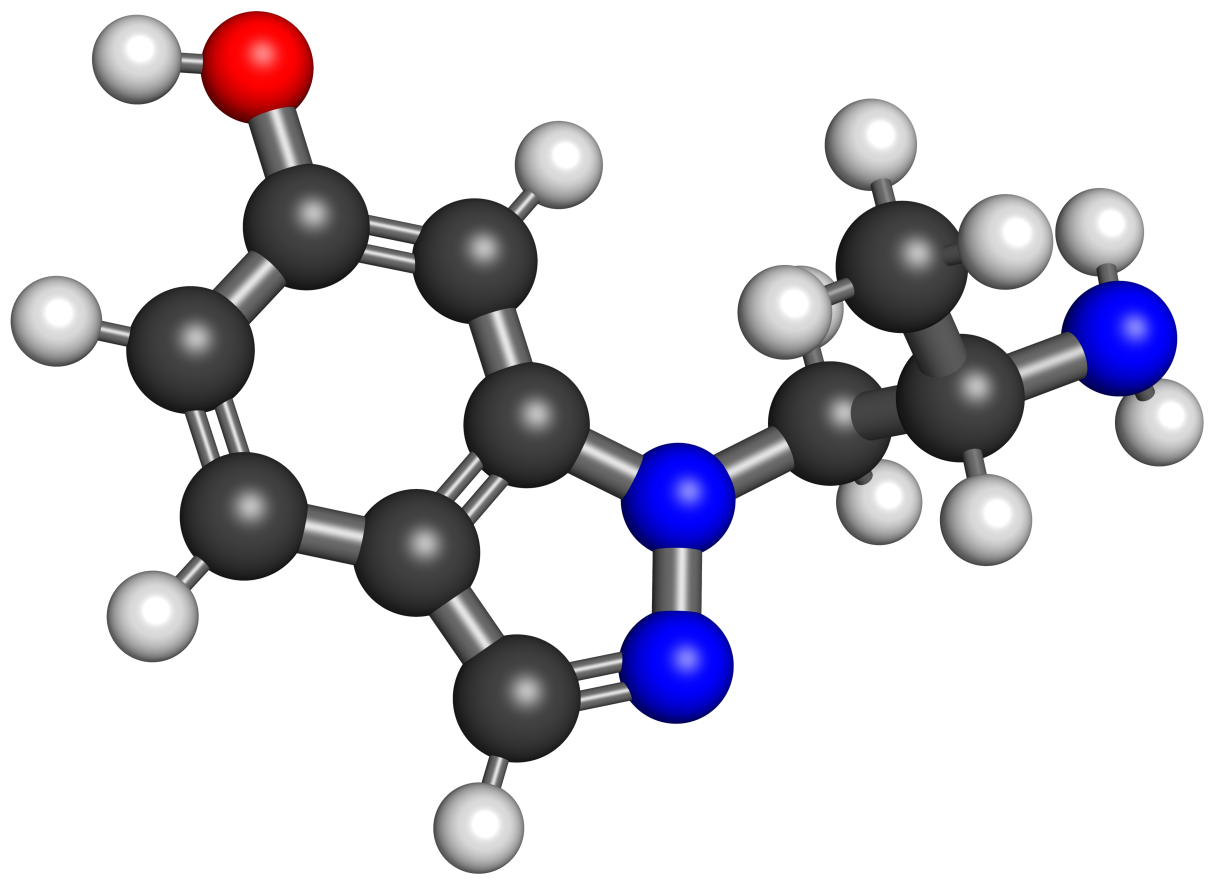

Clinical data
- Other names: Indazole-5-HO-AMT

Identifiers
- IUPAC name: 1-((S)-2-Aminopropyl)-1H-indazol-6-ol
- CAS Number: 362512-40-1
- PubChem CID: 135453290
- ChemSpider: 21467821
- UNII: 1Q6O947QMH
- ChEMBL: ChEMBL371300
- CompTox Dashboard (EPA): DTXSID901027133

Chemical and physical data
- Formula: C_{10}H_{13}N_{3}O
- Molar mass: 191.234 g·mol^{−1}
- 3D model (JSmol): Interactive image
- Melting point: 170 to 172 °C (338 to 342 °F)
- SMILES: CC(N)Cn1ncc2ccc(O)cc12
- InChI: InChI=1S/C10H13N3O/c1-7(11)6-13-10-4-9(14)3-2-8(10)5-12-13/h2-5,7,14H,6,11H2,1H3/t7-/m0/s1; Key:WBYHTZYHAFNBKW-ZETCQYMHSA-N

AL-34662 is an indazolethylamine derivative drug that is being developed for the treatment of glaucoma. It acts as a selective serotonin 5-HT_{2} receptor agonist, including of the 5-HT_{2A}, 5-HT_{2B}, and 5-HT_{2C} receptors (affinity (IC_{50}) = 14.5, 8.1, and 3.0 nM, respectively). The serotonin 5-HT_{2A} receptor is the same target as that of psychedelic drugs like psilocin. Unlike these drugs however, AL-34662 was designed specifically as a peripherally selective drug, which does not cross the blood–brain barrier. This means that AL-34662 can exploit a useful side effect of the hallucinogenic 5-HT_{2A} receptor agonists, namely reduction in intra-ocular pressure and hence relief from the symptoms of glaucoma, but without causing the psychedelic effects that make centrally active serotonin 5-HT_{2A} receptor agonists unsuitable for clinical use. In animal studies, AL-34662 has been shown to be potent and effective in the treatment of symptoms of glaucoma, with minimal side effects.

Peripherally acting 5-HT_{2A} agonists have been a rich field of research in recent years, with potential glaucoma treatments being the main proposed application for serotonin 5-HT_{2A} receptor agonists at present, as centrally acting agonists for this receptor tend to be hallucinogenic and thus their medical usefulness is currently limited to the treatment of psychiatric disorders. While many novel, potent, and selective serotonin 5-HT_{2A} receptor agonists have been developed for this application, retaining peripheral selectivity can be a problem, and several of the more lipophilic compounds closely related to AL-34662 such as those shown below, did cross the blood–brain barrier and produced hallucinogen-appropriate responding in animals.

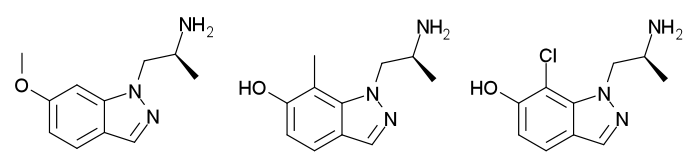

== See also ==
- Indazolethylamine
- Substituted tryptamine § Related compounds
- AL-38022A
- BW-501C67
- O-Methyl-AL-34662
- Ro60-0175
- SCHEMBL5334361
- VER-3323
- YM-348
- Xylamidine
- Zalsupindole
