= Isotryptamine =

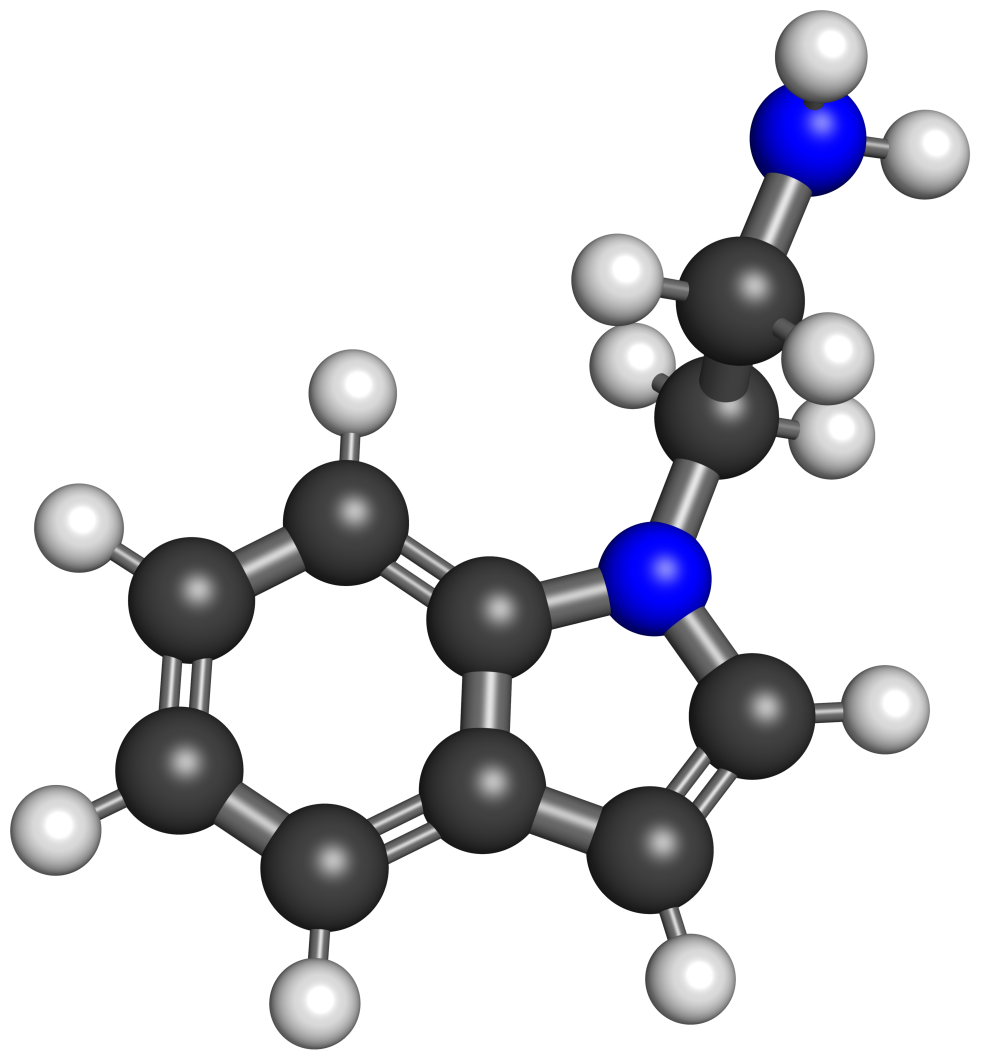

Names
- IUPAC name 2-indol-1-ylethanamine
- Other names 2-Indolylethylamine; 2-(1-Indolyl)ethylamine; 2-(1H-Indol-1-yl)ethanamine

Identifiers
CAS Number	13708-58-2
3D model (JSmol)	Interactive image
ChemSpider	227015
PubChem CID	258690
CompTox Dashboard (EPA)	DTXSID10293224
- InChI: InChI=1S/C10H12N2/c11-6-8-12-7-5-9-3-1-2-4-10(9)12/h1-5,7H,6,8,11H2 Key: BXEFQUSYBZYTAE-UHFFFAOYSA-N
- SMILES: C1=CC=C2C(=C1)C=CN2CCN

Properties
Chemical formula	C_{10}H_{12}N_{2}
Molar mass	160.220 g·mol^{−1}
- Except where otherwise noted, data are given for materials in their standard state (at 25 °C [77 °F], 100 kPa). Infobox references

Isotryptamine, also known as 2-(1-indolyl)ethylamine, is a chemical compound and positional isomer of tryptamine (2-(3-indolyl)ethylamine). A variety of isotryptamine derivatives, or substituted isotryptamines, have been studied and described.

== See also ==
- Substituted isotryptamine
- Substituted tryptamine § Related compounds
