= 5-MeO-isoDMT =

Serotonergic psychoplastogen

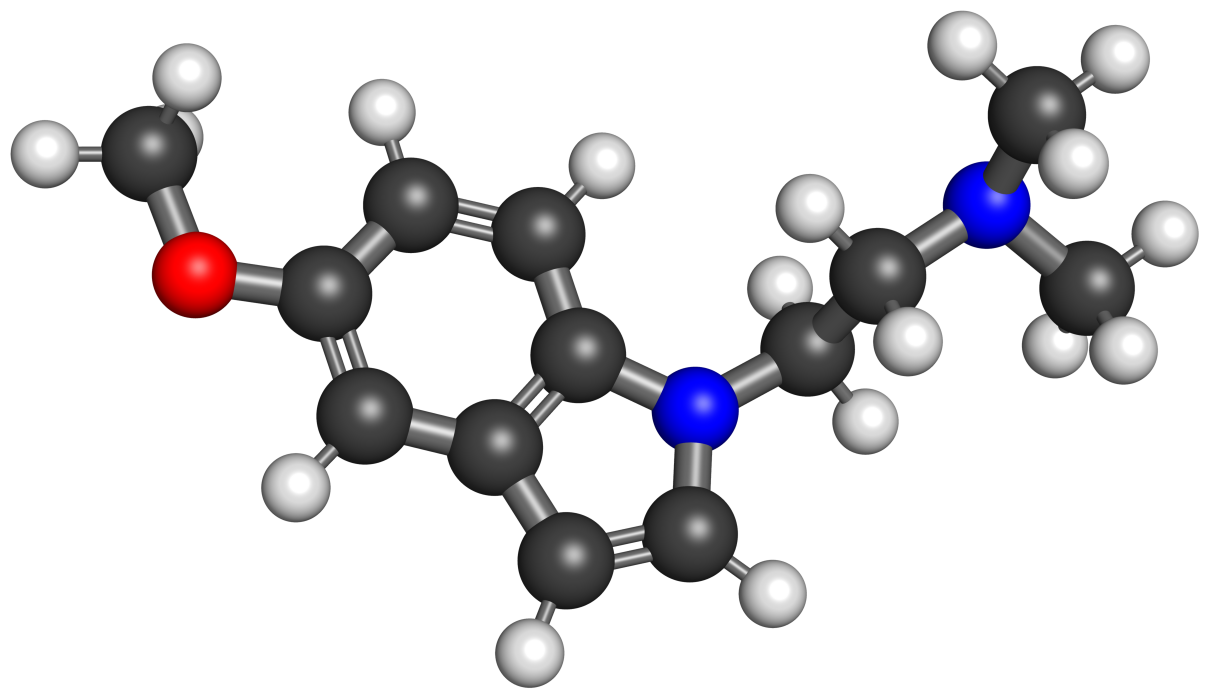

Clinical data
- Other names: 5-MeO-iso-DMT; 5-Methoxy-isoDMT; 5-OMe-isoDMT; 5-OMe-iso-DMT; 5-Methoxy-iso-DMT; 5-Methoxy-N,N-dimethylisotryptamine
- Drug class: Non-hallucinogenic serotonin 5-HT_{2A} receptor agonist; Psychoplastogen

Identifiers
- IUPAC name: 2-(5-methoxyindol-1-yl)-N,N-dimethylethanamine
- CAS Number: 244122-80-3
- PubChem CID: 44287166
- ChemSpider: 23136125
- ChEMBL: ChEMBL41806

Chemical and physical data
- Formula: C_{13}H_{18}N_{2}O
- Molar mass: 218.300 g·mol^{−1}
- 3D model (JSmol): Interactive image
- SMILES: CN(C)CCN1C=CC2=C1C=CC(=C2)OC
- InChI: InChI=1S/C13H18N2O/c1-14(2)8-9-15-7-6-11-10-12(16-3)4-5-13(11)15/h4-7,10H,8-9H2,1-3H3; Key:HRCTXPIFQNOZCQ-UHFFFAOYSA-N

5-MeO-isoDMT, or 5-OMe-isoDMT, also known as 5-methoxy-N,N-dimethylisotryptamine, is a prospective non-hallucinogenic serotonin 5-HT_{2A} receptor agonist and psychoplastogen of the isotryptamine group. It is the isotryptamine analogue of the non-hallucinogenic 6-MeO-DMT and is a positional isomer of the psychedelic 6-MeO-isoDMT.

The drug does not substitute for serotonergic psychedelics in animal drug discrimination tests and does not produce the head-twitch response, a behavioral of psychedelic effects, at any dose. Hence, it appears to be non-hallucinogenic. On the other hand, 5-MeO-isoDMT has comparable psychoplastogenic potency and effects compared to the psychedelic 5-MeO-DMT. These effects are blocked by the serotonin 5-HT_{2A} receptor antagonist ketanserin. Certain analogues and derivatives of 5-MeO-isoDMT, like isoDMT and the α-methylated zalsupindole (DLX-001; AAZ-A-154; (R)-5-MeO-α-methyl-isoDMT), likewise produce no head-twitch response, whereas 6-MeO-isoDMT produces a reduced head-twitch response. Hence, these analogues appear to be less or fully non-hallucinogenic similarly to 5-MeO-isoDMT. In addition, like 5-MeO-isoDMT, they retain potent psychoplastogenic effects.

5-MeO-isoDMT was first described in the scientific literature by 1984. It was subsequently further characterized in 2020. Confusingly, the drug has been referred to as "6-MeO-isoDMT" (or rather "6-OMe-isoDMT") in some publications.

== See also ==
- Substituted isotryptamine
- Substituted tryptamine § Related compounds
- Non-hallucinogenic 5-HT_{2A} receptor agonist
