= VER-3323 =

Chemical compound

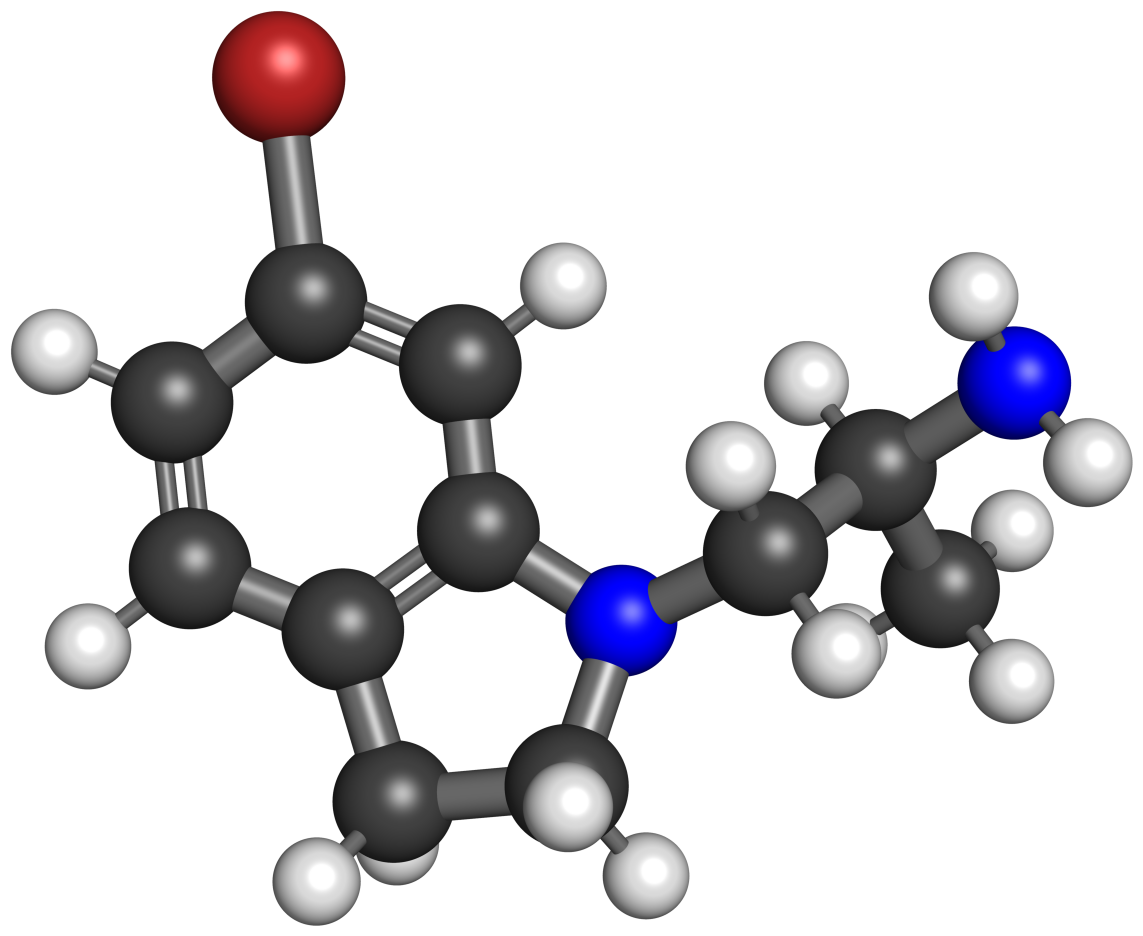

Identifiers
- IUPAC name: (2S)-1-(6-bromo-2,3-dihydroindol-1-yl)propan-2-amine
- CAS Number: 259857-99-3
- PubChem CID: 6604042
- IUPHAR/BPS: 168
- ChemSpider: 5036348
- UNII: 6V95Z2V9WG
- ChEMBL: ChEMBL309760
- CompTox Dashboard (EPA): DTXSID101018017

Chemical and physical data
- Formula: C_{11}H_{15}BrN_{2}
- Molar mass: 255.159 g·mol^{−1}
- 3D model (JSmol): Interactive image
- SMILES: C[C@@H](CN1CCc2c1cc(cc2)Br)N
- InChI: InChI=1S/C11H15BrN2/c1-8(13)7-14-5-4-9-2-3-10(12)6-11(9)14/h2-3,6,8H,4-5,7,13H2,1H3/t8-/m0/s1; Key:QGRQJMXAQYGAKK-QMMMGPOBSA-N

VER-3323 is a drug which acts as a selective agonist for both the 5-HT_{2B} and 5-HT_{2C} serotonin receptor subtypes, with moderate selectivity for 5-HT_{2C}, but relatively low affinity for 5-HT_{2A}. It has potent anorectic effects in animal studies.

== See also ==
- Substituted tryptamine § Related compounds
- α-Methylisotryptamine
- AL-34662
- AL-38022A
- Ro60-0175
- VU6067416
- YM-348
