= DLX-159 =

Clinical data
- Other names: DLX159
- Routes of administration: Oral
- Drug class: Psychoplastogen; Serotonin 5-HT_{2B} receptor antagonist; Other undisclosed actions

DLX-159 is a putatively non-hallucinogenic psychoplastogen of the tryptamine family which is under development for the treatment of major depressive disorder and other psychiatric disorders. It is taken orally.

== Pharmacology ==
The full mechanism of action of DLX-159 has yet to be disclosed. The drug shows psychoplastogenic effects in vitro and ex vivo. These effects are blocked by the serotonin 5-HT_{2A} receptor antagonst ketanserin as well as by the mTOR inhibitor rapamycin. It also shows indications of psychoplastogenic effects in vivo in rodents. In addition, similarly to ketamine, DLX-159 shows rapid antidepressant-like effects in the forced swim test (FST) in rodents that are present within 24 hours of a single dose and are sustained for at least 3 days. DLX-159 also reversed the depression-like phenotype induced by chronic interferon alpha exposure in rodents. DLX-159 does not produce the head-twitch response, and hence does not appear to have psychedelic effects.

DLX-159 shows no signs of cardiotoxicity in preclinical studies. It was assessed at the serotonin 5-HT_{2B} receptor and was found to be an antagonist of this receptor. It is said that further data on the pharmacological activity of DLX-159, including its activities at various receptors and enzymes, will be published in the future. The drug is orally bioavailable and crosses the blood–brain barrier.

== Research ==
DLX-159 is under development by Delix Therapeutics. As of January 2025, it is in the preclinical research stage of development. The drug was first described in the scientific literature by December 2024. Its chemical structure does not yet seem to have been disclosed. However, it has been disclosed to be a tryptamine derivative.

== See also ==
- List of investigational hallucinogens and entactogens
- List of investigational antidepressants
- Non-hallucinogenic 5-HT_{2A} receptor agonist
- Tabernanthalog (TBG; DLX-007)
- Zalsupindole (DLX-001; AAZ-A-154)
