= BOL-148 =

Chemical compound

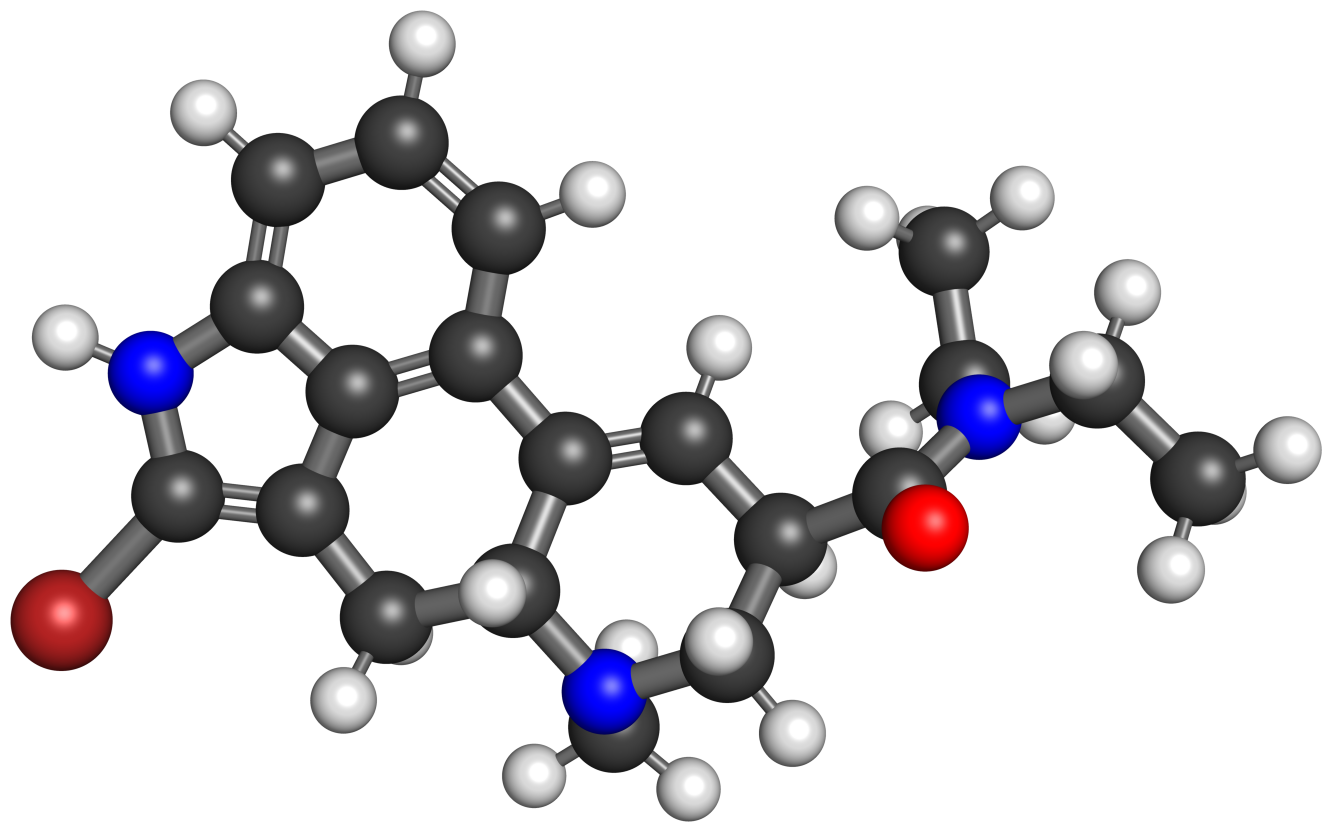

Clinical data
- Other names: BOL148; BOL; 2-Bromo-LSD; 2-Br-LSD; 2-bromolysergic acid diethylamide; Bromolysergide; Bromine-LSD; BETR-001; BTR001; TD-0148A; TD0148A; NYPRG-101; NYPRG101; 2-Bromo-N,N-diethyllysergamide; 2-Bromo-N,N-diethyl-6-methyl-9,10-didehydroergoline-8β-carboxamide
- Routes of administration: Oral
- Drug class: Serotonin receptor agonist; Non-hallucinogenic serotonin 5-HT_{2A} receptor agonist

Legal status
- Legal status: Not scheduled (United States, Canada, Germany, EU precursors)

Identifiers
- IUPAC name: (6aR,9R)-5-bromo-N,N-diethyl-7-methyl-4,6,6a,7,8,9-hexahydroindolo[4,3-fg]quinoline-9-carboxamide
- CAS Number: 478-84-2
- PubChem CID: 10171
- IUPHAR/BPS: 272
- ChemSpider: 9765
- UNII: JUA77QEU32
- ChEMBL: ChEMBL274384
- PDB ligand: A1AFU (PDBe, RCSB PDB)
- CompTox Dashboard (EPA): DTXSID30878496

Chemical and physical data
- Formula: C_{20}H_{24}BrN_{3}O
- Molar mass: 402.336 g·mol^{−1}
- 3D model (JSmol): Interactive image
- SMILES: CCN(CC)C(=O)[C@H]1CN([C@@H]2CC3=C(NC4=CC=CC(=C34)C2=C1)Br)C
- InChI: InChI=1S/C20H24BrN3O/c1-4-24(5-2)20(25)12-9-14-13-7-6-8-16-18(13)15(19(21)22-16)10-17(14)23(3)11-12/h6-9,12,17,22H,4-5,10-11H2,1-3H3/t12-,17-/m1/s1; Key:VKRAXSZEDRWLAG-SJKOYZFVSA-N

BOL-148, also known as 2-bromo-LSD or as bromolysergide, is a non-hallucinogenic serotonin receptor modulator of the lysergamide family related to the psychedelic drug lysergic acid diethylamide (LSD). It is specifically the 2-bromo derivative of LSD.

The drug is a non- or minimally-hallucinogenic serotonin 5-HT_{2A} receptor partial agonist, as well as acting at other targets such as other serotonin receptors and dopamine receptors. The lack of psychedelic effects with BOL-148 is thought to be due to lower-efficacy partial agonism at the serotonin 5-HT_{2A} receptor compared to LSD that is insufficient to produce hallucinogenic effects. The drug has been found to produce psychoplastogenic and antidepressant-like effects in animals.

BOL-148 was initially developed by Albert Hofmann in the 1950s, as part of the original research from which LSD was also derived. It is now being reinvestigated and is under development for the potential treatment of cluster headaches and other conditions. This is under new developmental code names including BETR-001, TD-0148A, and NYPRG-101.

== Use and effects ==
Clinical studies have found that unlike LSD, BOL-148 lacks hallucinogenic effects in humans at doses considered to be moderate to high. In addition, some but not all clinical studies of BOL-148 in combination with LSD have found BOL-148 to block the psychedelic effects of LSD.

However, some isolated incidents of hallucinogenic responses with BOL-148 have been reported. There is one case report of LSD-like delirium with BOL-148, and very high doses of BOL-148 have been reported to produce mild mental changes as well as LSD-like subjective effects. It may be that BOL-148, rather than being fully non-hallucinogenic, is actually mild psychedelic at sufficiently high doses. In any case, as with other non-hallucinogenic LSD analogues such as lisuride, hallucinogenic effects with BOL-148 appears to be a rare side effect occurring only in individuals with an as yet unexplained susceptibility to this reaction.

== Pharmacology ==
=== Pharmacodynamics ===
BOL-148 was found to be inactive as a psychedelic and so was comparatively little researched for many years, although its similar behaviour in the body made it useful for radiolabelling studies. It was found to bind to many of the same receptors as LSD, but acting as a neutral antagonist rather than an agonist. BOL-148 reportedly attenuates the effects of LSD in humans.

In 2023, BOL-148 was characterised as a non-hallucinogenic serotonin 5-HT_{2A} receptor biased partial agonist and as a serotonin 5-HT_{2B} receptor antagonist. It shows weaker partial agonism of the serotonin 5-HT_{2A} receptor than LSD (E_{max} = 60% vs. 92%, respectively). Unlike LSD, BOL-148 fails to produce the head-twitch response, a behavioural proxy of psychedelic effects, in animals. In addition, BOL-148 blocked the head-twitch response of the psychedelic DOI.

BOL-148 shows weak recruitment of β-arrestin2 and has reduced potential to induce tolerance in the form of serotonin 5-HT_{2A} receptor downregulation. Similarly to LSD, the drug was also found to interact with numerous other serotonin receptors and targets. However, BOL-148 reportedly shows less off-target activity compared to LSD. In animals, BOL-148 shows psychoplastogenic (i.e., neuroplasticity-enhancing) effects and antidepressant-like effects.

The cryo-EM structures of the serotonin 5-HT_{2A} receptor with BOL-148, as well as with various serotonergic psychedelics and other serotonin 5-HT_{2A} receptor agonists, have been solved and published by Bryan L. Roth and colleagues.

== Chemistry ==
=== Analogues ===
Analogues of BOL-148 (2-bromo-LSD) include 2-iodo-LSD (IOL, MBL-61 (MOB-61; 1-methyl-2-bromo-LSD), 1-methyl-2-iodo-LSD (MIL), 2-oxo-LSD, and bromocriptine, among others. 1P-BOL-148 (1-propionyl-2-bromo-LSD; SYN-L-017) is an ester prodrug of BOL-148.

== Development ==
The generally similar behaviour of BOL-148 to LSD in some respects has shown to be very useful in potential the treatment of cluster headaches. These debilitating attacks have been known for some time to be amenable to treatment with certain hallucinogenic drugs such as LSD and psilocybin, but because of the illegal status of these drugs and the kind of mental changes they induce, research into their medical use has been slow and therapeutic application limited to very specific circumstances under strict supervision. It had been thought that this specific therapeutic action against cluster headaches was limited to hallucinogenic drugs of this type, and would always present a major barrier to their clinical use. However, a serendipitous discovery found that BOL-148 can also produce this therapeutic effect, despite lacking the other effects of LSD. This has led to a resurgence of interest and research into BOL-148 and its possible medical uses.

BOL-148, under the developmental code name BETR-001 (previously TD-0148A), is under development by BetterLife Pharma for the treatment of cluster headaches and other indications. A prodrug of BOL-148, under the developmental code name SPT-348, is also under development by Seaport Therapeutics for the treatment of depression, anxiety, and other neuropsychiatric disorders.

== See also ==
- Substituted lysergamide
- Non-hallucinogenic 5-HT_{2A} receptor agonist
- List of investigational hallucinogens and entactogens
- Lisuride
- 1P-BOL-148
- 2-Methyl-DMT
- LEK-8841 (2-bromo-LEK-8842)
