= 1P-BOL-148 =

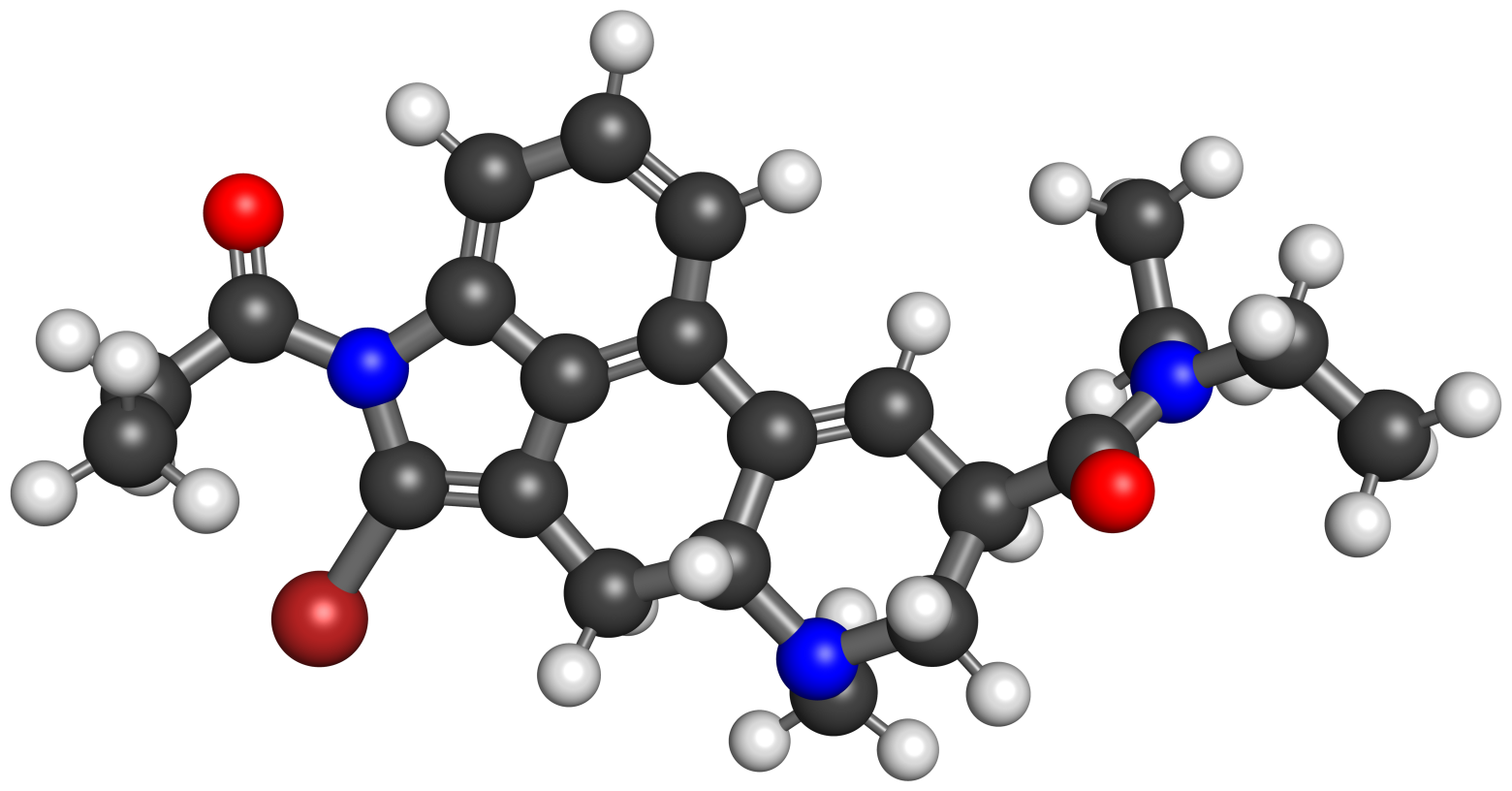

Clinical data
- Other names: 1-Propionyl-2-bromo-LSD; SYN-L-017

Identifiers
- IUPAC name: (6aR,9R)-5-bromo-N,N-diethyl-7-methyl-4-propanoyl-6,6a,8,9-tetrahydroindolo[4,3-fg]quinoline-9-carboxamide
- PubChem CID: 169001441

Chemical and physical data
- Formula: C_{23}H_{28}BrN_{3}O_{2}
- Molar mass: 458.400 g·mol^{−1}
- 3D model (JSmol): Interactive image
- SMILES: CCC(=O)N1C2=CC=CC3=C2C(=C1Br)C[C@@H]4C3=C[C@H](CN4C)C(=O)N(CC)CC
- InChI: InChI=1S/C23H28BrN3O2/c1-5-20(28)27-18-10-8-9-15-16-11-14(23(29)26(6-2)7-3)13-25(4)19(16)12-17(21(15)18)22(27)24/h8-11,14,19H,5-7,12-13H2,1-4H3/t14-,19-/m1/s1; Key:PLXWJCJZSCKGNW-AUUYWEPGSA-N

1P-BOL-148, also known as 1-propionyl-2-bromo-LSD or as SYN-L-017, is an analogue of LSD which acts as a prodrug for 2-bromo-LSD (BOL-148). It does not have hallucinogenic effects, but is claimed to be potentially useful for the treatment of cluster headaches, and as an antidepressant.

== See also ==
- Substituted lysergamide
- MBL-61 (1-methyl-2-bromo-LSD)
- 1-Methyl-2-iodo-LSD (MIL)
- 1P-LSD
