= 6-MeO-isoDMT =

Serotonergic psychoplastogen

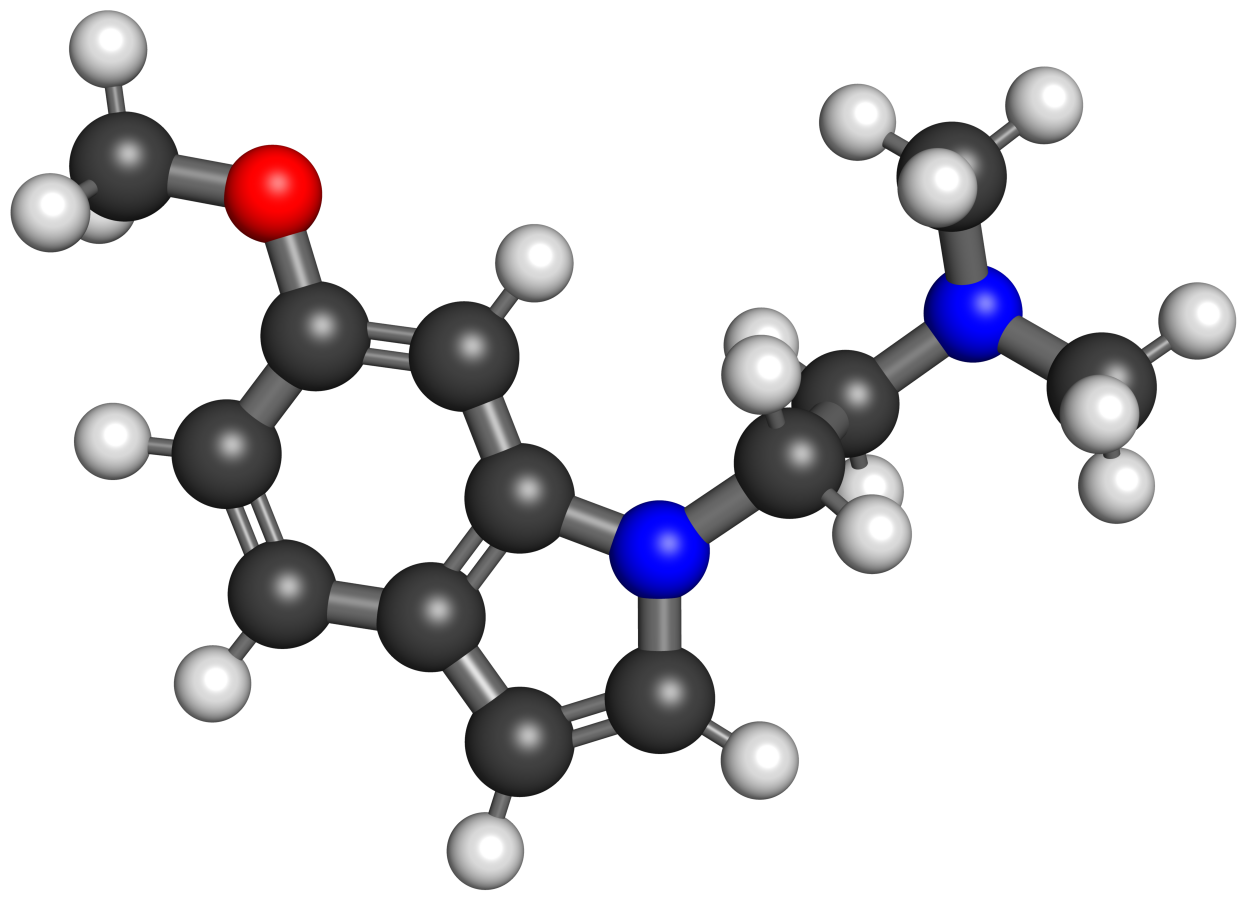

Clinical data
- Other names: 6-MeO-iso-DMT; 6-Methoxy-isoDMT; 6-OMe-isoDMT; 6-OMe-iso-DMT; 6-Methoxy-iso-DMT; 6-Methoxy-N,N-dimethylisotryptamine
- Drug class: Serotonin 5-HT_{2A} receptor agonist; Serotonergic psychedelic; Hallucinogen; Psychoplastogen

Identifiers
- IUPAC name: 2-(6-methoxyindol-1-yl)-N,N-dimethylethanamine
- CAS Number: 87482-11-9
- PubChem CID: 44287445
- ChemSpider: 23136442
- ChEMBL: ChEMBL38742

Chemical and physical data
- Formula: C_{13}H_{18}N_{2}O
- Molar mass: 218.300 g·mol^{−1}
- 3D model (JSmol): Interactive image
- SMILES: CN(C)CCN1C=CC2=C1C=C(C=C2)OC
- InChI: InChI=1S/C13H18N2O/c1-14(2)8-9-15-7-6-11-4-5-12(16-3)10-13(11)15/h4-7,10H,8-9H2,1-3H3; Key:VIEWFQAHIRFETA-UHFFFAOYSA-N

6-MeO-isoDMT, or 6-OMe-isoDMT, also known as 6-methoxy-N,N-dimethylisotryptamine, is a serotonin 5-HT_{2A} receptor agonist, prospective serotonergic psychedelic, and psychoplastogen of the isotryptamine group. It is the isotryptamine analogue of the psychedelic 5-MeO-DMT and is a positional isomer of the non-hallucinogenic psychoplastogen 5-MeO-isoDMT.

The drug has been found to substitute for DOM and hence to produce hallucinogen-like effects in animal drug discrimination tests. However, it has greatly reduced hallucinogenic potential in terms of the head-twitch response, a behavioral proxy of psychedelic effects, compared to 5-MeO-DMT. It has even been described as "non-hallucinogenic" in at least one publication, although this does not strictly seem to be true. Conversely, 6-MeO-isoDMT has comparable psychoplastogenic potency and effects compared to 5-MeO-DMT. These effects are blocked by the serotonin 5-HT_{2A} receptor antagonist ketanserin. Certain analogues of 6-MeO-isoDMT, like isoDMT, 5-MeO-isoDMT, and zalsupindole (DLX-001; AAZ-A-154; (R)-5-MeO-α-methyl-isoDMT), produce no head-twitch response at all and hence appear to be fully non-hallucinogenic, similarly to 6-MeO-DMT (the tryptamine analogue of 5-MeO-isoDMT). However, like 6-MeO-isoDMT, they retain potent psychoplastogenic effects.

6-MeO-isoDMT was first described in the scientific literature by 1984. It was subsequently further characterized in 2020. Confusingly, the drug has been referred to as "5-MeO-isoDMT" (or rather "5-OMe-isoDMT") in some publications.

== See also ==
- Substituted isotryptamine
- Substituted tryptamine § Related compounds
- Non-hallucinogenic 5-HT_{2A} receptor agonist
