= Zalsupindole =

Chemical compound

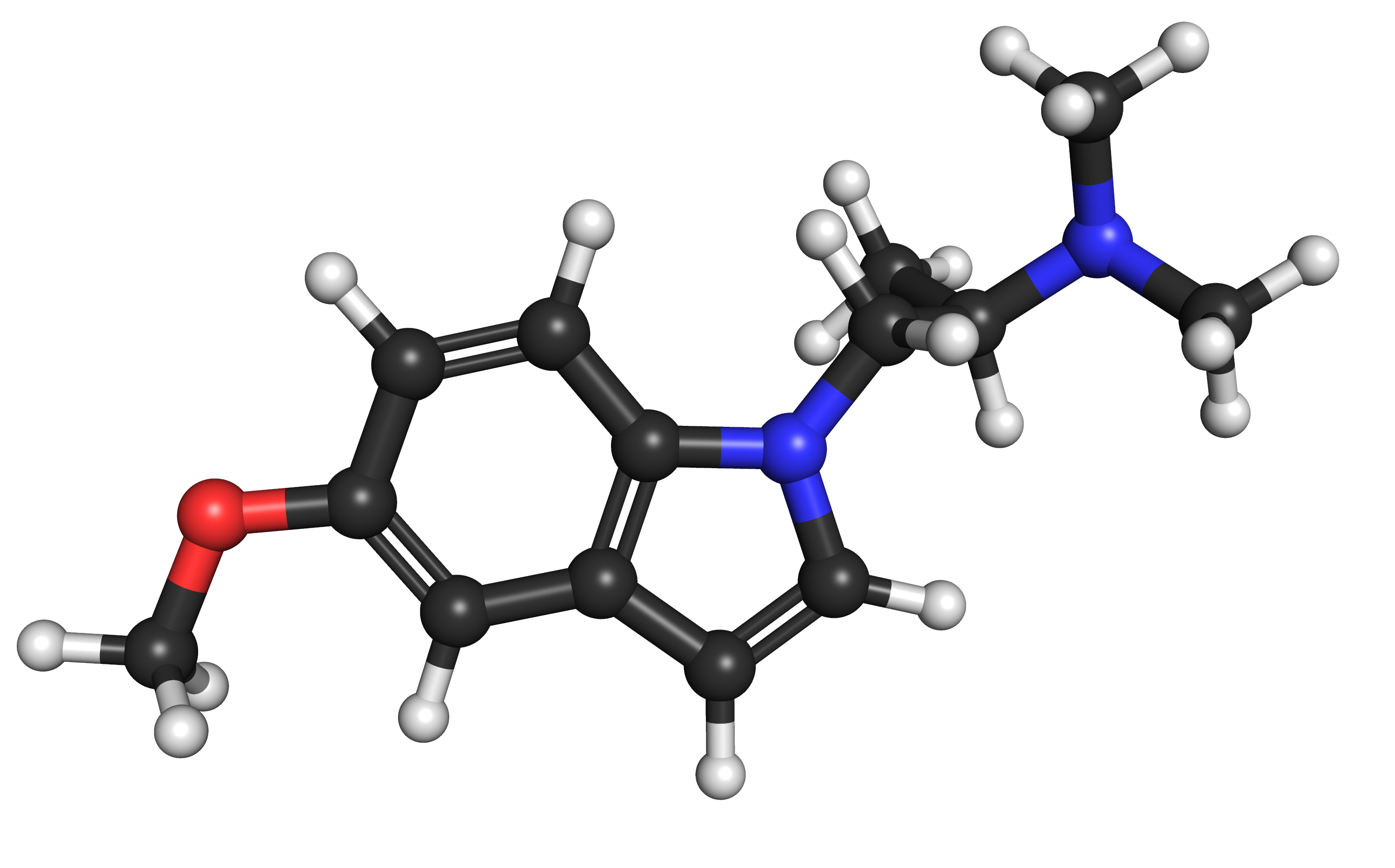

Clinical data
- Other names: ZAL; DLX-001; DLX-1; DLX001; DLX1; AAZ-A-154; AAZ; (R)-5-Methoxy-N,N-dimethyl-α-methylisotryptamine; (R)-5-MeO-α-methyl-isoDMT; (R)-5-MeO-N,N-dimethyl-isoAMT
- Routes of administration: Oral
- Drug class: Non-hallucinogenic serotonin 5-HT_{2A} receptor agonist; Psychoplastogen
- ATC code: None

Identifiers
- IUPAC name: (2R)-1-(5-methoxy-1H-indol-1-yl)-N,N-dimethylpropan-2-amine
- CAS Number: 2481740-94-5
- PubChem CID: 154694212
- ChemSpider: 129562407
- UNII: UR7446669R
- CompTox Dashboard (EPA): DTXSID901336869

Chemical and physical data
- Formula: C_{14}H_{20}N_{2}O
- Molar mass: 232.327 g·mol^{−1}
- 3D model (JSmol): Interactive image
- SMILES: CN(C)[C@H](C)Cn1ccc2cc(ccc21)OC
- InChI: InChI=1S/C14H20N2O/c1-11(15(2)3)10-16-8-7-12-9-13(17-4)5-6-14(12)16/h5-9,11H,10H2,1-4H3/t11-/m1/s1; Key:KHEUWLQKCXGVEL-LLVKDONJSA-N

Zalsupindole, also known by its code names DLX-001 and AAZ-A-154 and as (R)-5-methoxy-N,N-dimethyl-α-methylisotryptamine ((R)-5-MeO-α-Me-isoDMT), is non-hallucinogenic serotonin receptor agonist and psychoplastogen of the isotryptamine family related to psychedelic tryptamines such as dimethyltryptamine (DMT). It is under development for the treatment of major depressive disorder and other central nervous system disorders. The drug is taken orally.

It acts as a partial agonist of the serotonin 5-HT_{2A} receptor and also interacts with other serotonin receptors. The drug activates the serotonin 5-HT_{2A} receptor with sufficiently high efficacy to promote neuroplasticity but not with adequate efficacy to cause psychedelic effects. It does not produce psychedelic-like effects in animals or humans but does produce antidepressant-like effects in animals.

Zalsupindole was first described in the scientific literature by 2021. It was developed by David E. Olson and colleagues at the University of California, Davis and Delix Therapeutics. As of April 2026, it has successfully completed Phase 1 clinical trials, demonstrating positive safety and biomarker data. The FDA has cleared the Investigational New Drug (IND) application for a Phase 2 trial, which includes a study design for at-home administration.

== Use and effects ==
A phase 1 dose-ranging clinical trial found that zalsupindole is non-hallucinogenic in humans across a dose range of 2 to 360 mg orally. Nonetheless, it produced changes in brain function as measured by quantitative electroencephalography (qEEG).

== Side effects ==
Side effects of zalsupindole include dose-dependent nausea, headache, and dizziness.

== Pharmacology ==
=== Pharmacodynamics ===
Zalsupindole is a non-selective serotonin receptor modulator including of the serotonin 5-HT_{2A} receptor. It acts as a low-potency, low-efficacy partial agonist of the serotonin 5-HT_{2A} receptor, with an EC_{50} of 8,200 nM and an E_{max} of 17%. The drug is also a moderate-efficacy partial agonist of the serotonin 5-HT_{2C} receptor, with an EC_{50} of 3,300 nM and an E_{max} of 70%. Other activities have also been reported. It is selective for the serotonin 5-HT_{2} receptors over a number of other receptors, including the serotonin 5-HT_{1A} receptor, dopamine receptors, adrenergic receptors, and the κ-opioid receptor, among others. The drug is a silent antagonist of the serotonin 5-HT_{2B} receptor, with an IC_{50} of 27,600 nM.

Zalsupindole is orally bioavailable and centrally penetrant in animals. It is a psychoplastogen via activation of the serotonin 5-HT_{2A} receptor and rapidly and persistently increases neuroplasticity in preclinical research. The serotonin 5-HT_{2A} receptor antagonist ketanserin abolishes the psychoplastogenic effects of zalsupindole. Zalsupindole produces comparable psychoplastogenic effects to serotonergic psychedelics like psilocin and dimethyltryptamine (DMT) as well as to the dissociative ketamine. Animal studies have found that the drug produces antidepressant-like effects without causing psychedelic-like effects such as the head-twitch response. It does not produce hyperlocomotion at therapeutically relevant doses. In accordance with its serotonin 5-HT_{2B} receptor antagonism, zalsupindole showed no cardiovascular safety signals in animals.

=== Pharmacokinetics ===
The pharmacokinetics of zalsupindole have been studied.

== Chemistry ==
Zalsupindole, also known as (R)-5-methoxy-N,N-dimethyl-α-methylisotryptamine, is a substituted isotryptamine derivative. It is a combined derivative of 5-methoxy-N,N-dimethylisotryptamine (5-MeO-isoDMT) and α-methylisotryptamine (isoAMT). Another related compound is 6-methoxy-N,N-dimethylisotryptamine (6-MeO-isoDMT). Zalsupindole is a close isotryptamine analogue of α,N,N,O-tetramethylserotonin (α,N,N,O-TMS or 5-MeO-α,N,N-TMT).

=== Synthesis ===
The chemical synthesis of zalsupindole has been described.

== History ==
Zalsupindole was first described in the scientific literature by David E. Olson and colleagues in 2021. It was developed by Olson's lab at the University of California, Davis and at his company Delix Therapeutics. The drug was first synthesized in 2019. It was initially described under the name AAZ-A-154 and then by the name DLX-001 before receiving the name zalsupindole.

== Society and culture ==
=== Names ===
Zalsupindole is the generic name of the drug and its INN. It is also known by its developmental code names DLX-001 and AAZ-A-154.

== Research ==
Zalsupindole, as well as related drugs such as tabernanthalog (TBG; DLX-007), DLX-159, DLX-2270, and JRT, are licensed by Delix Therapeutics and are being developed for treatment of neuropsychiatric disorders such as depression and schizophrenia. As of January 2026, zalsupindole is in phase 1 clinical trials for major depressive disorder and other central nervous system disorders. Phase 1a and 1b trials have been completed and results reported. A phase 2 trial is being planned and has been cleared by the FDA for at home administration.

== See also ==
- Substituted isotryptamine
- Substituted tryptamine § Related compounds
- Non-hallucinogenic 5-HT_{2A} receptor agonist
- List of investigational hallucinogens and entactogens
- List of investigational antidepressants
