= SDZ SER-082 =

Chemical compound

Clinical data
- Other names: SDZ SER-082; SDZ SER082
- Drug class: Selective serotonin 5-HT_{2B} and 5-HT_{2C} receptor antagonist or weak partial agonist

Identifiers
- IUPAC name: (2R,7S)-4-methyl-4,9-diazatetracyclo[7.6.1.02,7.012,16]hexadeca-1(15),12(16),13-triene
- CAS Number: 141474-54-6
- PubChem CID: 9859407
- IUPHAR/BPS: 195
- ChemSpider: 8035107
- UNII: M7FHF24Q22
- ChEMBL: ChEMBL316069
- CompTox Dashboard (EPA): DTXSID001028477

Chemical and physical data
- Formula: C_{15}H_{20}N_{2}
- Molar mass: 228.339 g·mol^{−1}
- 3D model (JSmol): Interactive image
- SMILES: CN1CC[C@@H]2CN3CCC4=C3C(=CC=C4)[C@@H]2C1
- InChI: InChI=1S/C15H20N2/c1-16-7-5-12-9-17-8-6-11-3-2-4-13(15(11)17)14(12)10-16/h2-4,12,14H,5-10H2,1H3/t12-,14-/m1/s1; Key:YASBOGFWAMXINH-TZMCWYRMSA-N

SER-082, or SDZ SER-082, is a selective serotonin 5-HT_{2B} and 5-HT_{2C} receptor antagonist or weak partial agonist with an ergoline-like structure which is used in scientific research. It shows similar affinity for the serotonin 5-HT_{2B} and 5-HT_{2C} receptors and has ~40-fold higher affinity for the serotonin 5-HT_{2C} receptor over the closely related serotonin 5-HT_{2A} receptor.

It has been used in animal studies into the behavioural effects of the different 5-HT_{2} subtypes, and how they influence the effects of other drugs such as cocaine. The drug has been found to have no effect on anxiety in multiple paradigms in rodents. In contrast to other serotonin 5-HT_{2C} receptor antagonists, SER-082 does not produce hyperlocomotion in rodents, and instead can produce hypolocomotion at high doses that is independent of the serotonin 5-HT_{2C} receptor.

It fails to block the effects of serotonergic psychedelics in multiple behavioral paradigms, in contrast to serotonin 5-HT_{2A} receptor antagonists. However, the hypolocomotion induced by high doses of the phenethylamine psychedelic DOI can be attenuated by SER-082. Conversely, the drug was ineffective against the hypolocomotion induced by the tryptamine psychedelic 5-MeO-DMT, whereas the serotonin 5-HT_{1A} receptor antagonist WAY-100635 was effective.

== See also ==
- Lysergine
- JRT
