= AL-38022A =

Psychedelic drug

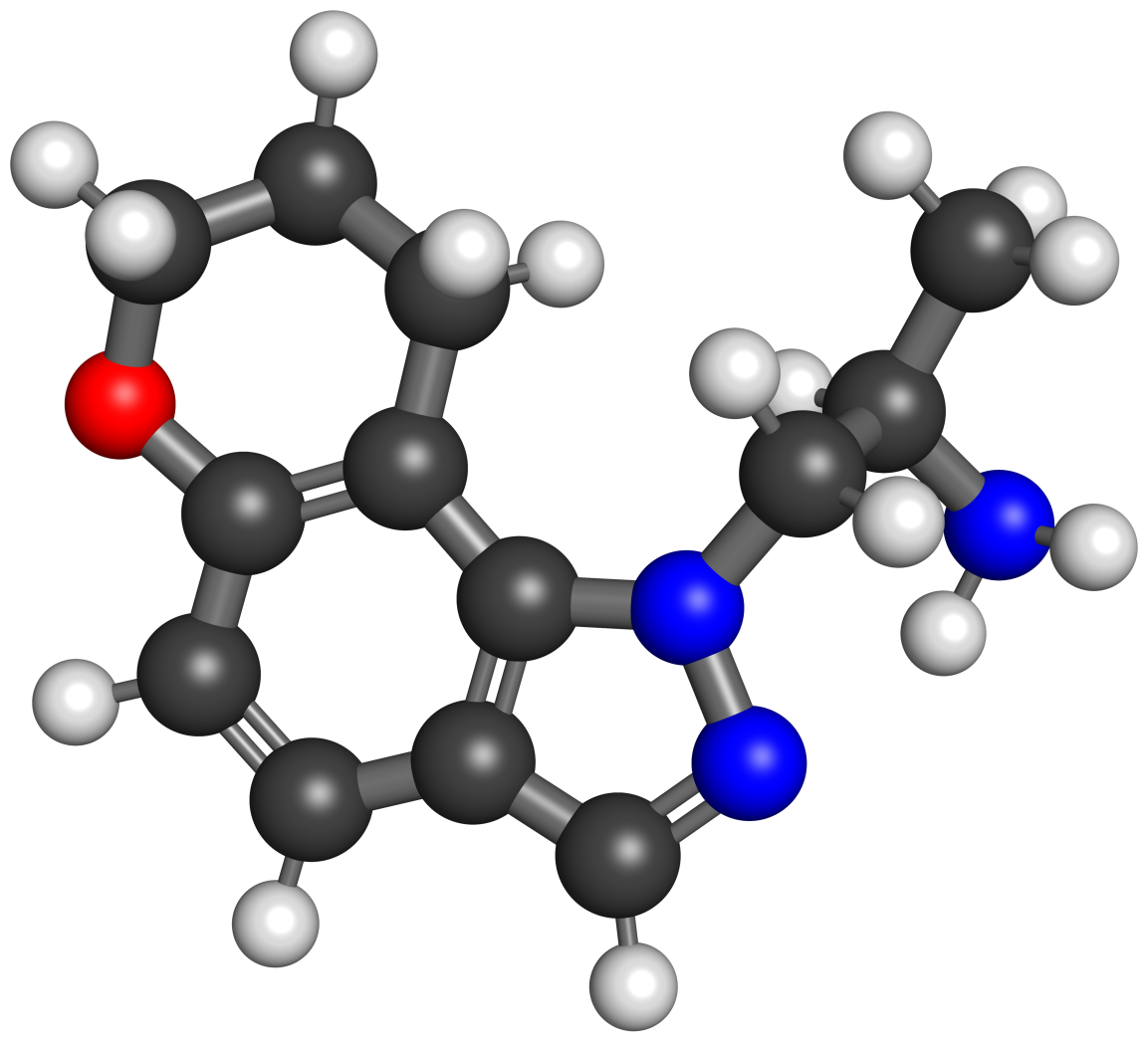

Clinical data
- Other names: AL38022A; Indazole-4,5-DHP-AMT
- Drug class: Serotonin receptor modulator; Serotonin 5-HT_{2A} receptor agonist; Serotonergic psychedelic; Hallucinogen
- ATC code: None

Identifiers
- IUPAC name: (S)-2-(8,9-Dihydro-7H-pyrano[2,3-g]indazol-1-yl)-1-methylethylamine
- CAS Number: 478132-11-5
- PubChem CID: 22496603
- ChemSpider: 26286943
- UNII: 76NY5U584E
- CompTox Dashboard (EPA): DTXSID40626203

Chemical and physical data
- Formula: C_{13}H_{17}N_{3}O
- Molar mass: 231.299 g·mol^{−1}
- 3D model (JSmol): Interactive image
- Melting point: 106 to 107 °C (223 to 225 °F)
- SMILES: c13CCCOc3ccc(cn2)c1n2CC(C)N
- InChI: InChI=1S/C13H17N3O/c1-9(14)8-16-13-10(7-15-16)4-5-12-11(13)3-2-6-17-12/h4-5,7,9H,2-3,6,8,14H2,1H3/t9-/m0/s1; Key:FJRIVFVALIEIOY-VIFPVBQESA-N

AL-38022A is a serotonin receptor agonist and psychedelic drug of the indazolethylamine family related to the psychedelic tryptamine 5-MeO-AMT. It is one of a range of similar drugs developed for scientific research and with some possible clinical applications such as in the treatment of glaucoma. The drug acts as a potent and selective agonist for the 5-HT_{2} family of serotonin receptors, with highest binding affinity for the 5-HT_{2C} subtype and around four times less affinity for 5-HT_{2A} and 5-HT_{2B}. In drug discrimination tests in animals, it fully substituted for the psychedelic drugs 5-MeO-DMT and DOM. AL-38022A was first described in the scientific literature by Richard Glennon and colleagues in 2009.

== See also ==
- Indazolethylamine
- Substituted tryptamine § Related compounds
- AL-34662
- AL-37350A
- O-Methyl-AL-34662
- Ro60-0175
- VER-3323
- YM-348
