= VU6067416 =

Chemical compound

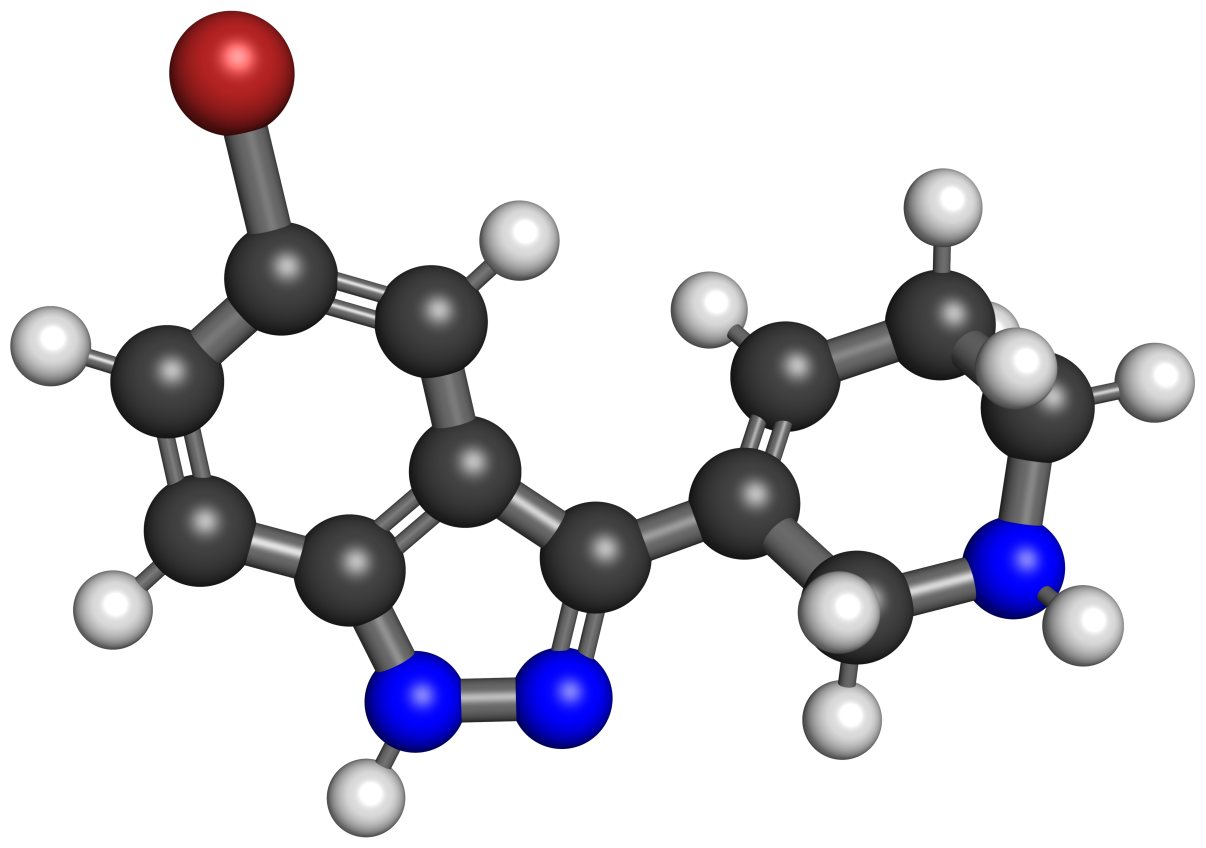

Identifiers
- IUPAC name: 3-(1,2,5,6-tetrahydropyridin-3-yl)-5-bromo-1H-indazole
- CAS Number: 3027515-24-5
- PubChem CID: 170453288

Chemical and physical data
- Formula: C_{12}H_{12}BrN_{3}
- Molar mass: 278.153 g·mol^{−1}
- 3D model (JSmol): Interactive image
- SMILES: Brc1cc2c(n[NH]c2cc1)C=1CNCCC=1
- InChI: InChI=1S/C12H12BrN3/c13-9-3-4-11-10(6-9)12(16-15-11)8-2-1-5-14-7-8/h2-4,6,14H,1,5,7H2,(H,15,16); Key:OZAHEVLLVSEENQ-UHFFFAOYSA-N

VU6067416 is an indazolethylamine and tetrahydropyridinylindazole derivative which acts as an agonist for the 5-HT_{2} family of serotonin receptors. It is a potent full agonist at 5-HT_{2B}, and has slightly lower affinity and partial agonist effects at 5-HT_{2A} and 5-HT_{2C}, though some related compounds have improved selectivity for 5-HT_{2A}.

== See also ==
- Indazolethylamine
- Substituted tryptamine § Related compounds
- Cyclized tryptamine
- RU-28253
- (R)-69
- 6-APB
- BW-723C86
- RS134-49
- VER-3323
