= YM-348 =

Chemical compound

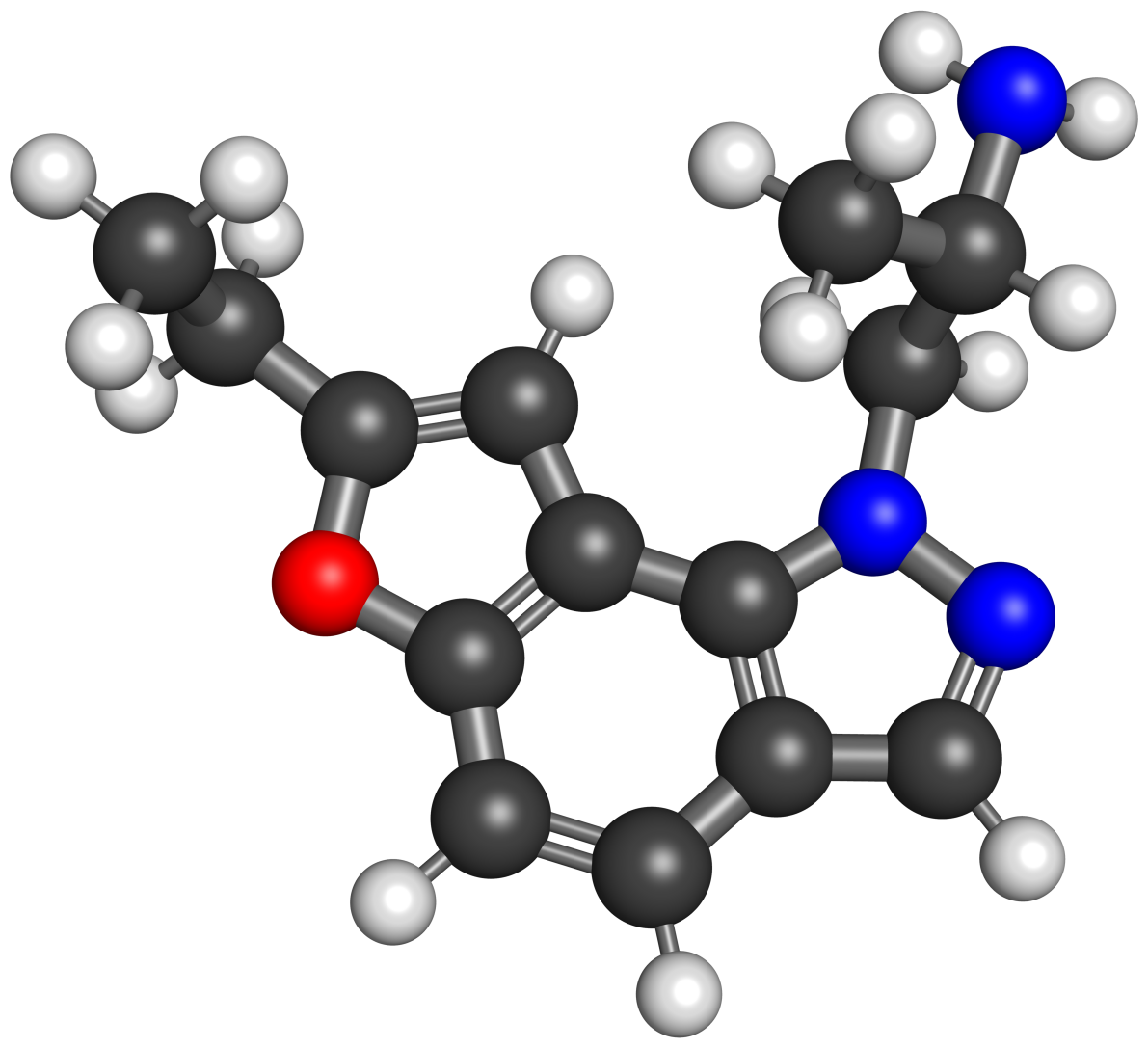

Identifiers
- IUPAC name: (2S)-1-(7-ethyl-1H-furo[2,3-g]indazol-1-yl)propan-2-amine
- CAS Number: 372163-84-3
- PubChem CID: 3045225
- IUPHAR/BPS: 230
- ChemSpider: 2308001
- UNII: VTV38S7D39
- CompTox Dashboard (EPA): DTXSID50190708

Chemical and physical data
- Formula: C_{14}H_{17}N_{3}O
- Molar mass: 243.310 g·mol^{−1}
- 3D model (JSmol): Interactive image
- SMILES: n3cc2ccc1oc(cc1c2n3C[C@@H](N)C)CC
- InChI: InChI=1S/C14H17N3O/c1-3-11-6-12-13(18-11)5-4-10-7-16-17(14(10)12)8-9(2)15/h4-7,9H,3,8,15H2,1-2H3/t9-/m0/s1; Key:QLOOWOVVZLBYHU-VIFPVBQESA-N

YM-348 is an indazolethylamine derivative drug which acts as a potent and selective 5-HT_{2C} receptor agonist, with an EC_{50} of 1nM and 15x selectivity over 5-HT_{2A}, although it only has moderate selectivity of 3x over the closely related 5-HT_{2B} receptor. It has thermogenic and anorectic effects in animal studies, making it potentially useful for the treatment of obesity.

== See also ==
- Indazolethylamine
- Substituted tryptamine § Related compounds
- AL-34662
- AL-38022A
- O-Methyl-AL-34662
- Ro60-0175
- VER-3323
