= David E. Olson =

American chemist and neuroscientist

- Education: Union College, Stanford University, Broad Institute of MIT and Harvard
- Occupations: Chemical Neuroscientist, Professor, Entrepreneur
- Employer(s): University of California, Davis; Delix Therapeutics
- Known for: Discovery of neuroplasticity promoting effects of psychedelics; Discovery of nonhallucinogenic psychoplastogens
- Website: Olsonlab.org

David E. Olson is an American chemist and neuroscientist. He is a professor of chemistry, biochemistry and molecular medicine at the University of California, Davis, and is the founding director of the UC Davis Institute for Psychedelics and Neurotherapeutics.

Olson is best known for his work investigating neuroplasticity promoting compounds, especially the potential of psychedelic drugs, including ketamine and serotonergic psychedelics, to alter brain structure and function. Olson also coined a term to refer to small molecules that are fast acting, durable neuroplasticity promoting compounds: psychoplastogens. Psychoplastogens are being developed to treat a wide variety of neuropsychiatric and neurodegenerative diseases, including depression, PTSD, and substance use disorders, among many others. He researched non-hallucinogenic psychoplastogens, which decouple therapeutic neuroplasticity from hallucinogenic effects. Key examples of these silent plastogens developed by his team include Zalsupindole and Tabernanthalog.

== Early life ==
Olson received his B.S. from Union College in 2006 with a major in chemistry and a minor in biology.

He then worked briefly at Albany Molecular Research Inc. before completing a Ph.D. in chemistry at Stanford University in 2011, where he worked in the laboratory of Justin Du Bois, developing a variety of methods for synthesizing nitrogen-containing compounds.

Olson undertook postdoctoral research in neuroscience at the Stanley Center for Psychiatric Research at the Broad Institute of MIT and Harvard where he focused on the therapeutic potential of HDAC inhibitors.

== Career ==
In 2015 Olson started his independent career at the University of California, Davis, with a joint appointment in the department of chemistry (college of letters and science) and the department of biochemistry and molecular medicine (school of medicine). He is also an affiliate member of the Center for Neuroscience and the UC Davis Memory and Plasticity Program. Olson was promoted to associate professor with tenure in 2021 and full professor in 2024. In 2019, Olson co-founded Delix Therapeutics—a biotech company focused on developing novel neuroplasticity-promoting therapeutics for central nervous system diseases (CNS). Olson served as the company's chief scientific officer until 2021, when he transitioned to the roles of chief innovation officer and head of the scientific advisory board. As of July 1, 2026 Olson is the Editor-in-Chief of ACS Chemical Neuroscience.

== Awards ==
- 2023 Mahoney Institute for Neurosciences (MINS) Rising Star Award
- 2023 UC Davis Chancellor's Fellow
- 2022 Sacramento Business Journal's 40 Under 40
- 2021 Sigma Xi Young Investigator Award
- 2021 Camille Dreyfus Teacher-Scholar
- 2021 Life Young Investigator Award
- 2020 Jordi Folch-Pi Award from the American Society for Neurochemistry

== Other activities ==
Currently, he serves on the editorial advisory boards of the journals ACS Chemical Neuroscience and ACS Pharmacology & Translational Science.

== Published works ==
Olson has published numerous scientific publications. Several of his key contributions to the field are cited below:

- Aarrestad, Isak K.; Cameron, Lindsay P.; et al. (2025). "The psychoplastogen tabernanthalog induces neuroplasticity without proximate immediate early gene activation". Nature Neuroscience. 28 (9): 1919–1931. doi:10.1038/s41593-025-02021-1. PMC 12373294. PMID 40760185.
- Tuck, Jeremy R.; Dunlap, Lee E.; et al. (2025). "Molecular design of a therapeutic LSD analogue with reduced hallucinogenic potential". Proc Natl Acad Sci U S A. 122 (16) e2416106122. Bibcode:2025PNAS..12216106T. doi:10.1073/pnas.2416106122. PMC 12037037. PMID 40228113.
- Iyer, Rishab N.; Favela, David; Domokos, Andras; Zhang, Guoliang; Avanes, Arabo A.; Carter, Samuel J.; Basargin, Andrian G.; Davis, Alexis R.; Tantillo, Dean J.; Olson, David E. (2025). "Efficient and modular synthesis of ibogaine and related alkaloids". Nature Chemistry. 17 (3): 412–420. Bibcode:2025NatCh..17..412I. doi:10.1038/s41557-024-01714-7. PMC 11952118. PMID 39915657.
- Muir, J.; Lin, Sl; Aarrestad, I. K.; Daniels, H. R.; Ma, J.; Tian, L.; Olson, D. E.; Kim, C. K. (2024). "Isolation of psychedelic-responsive neurons underlying anxiolytic behavioral states". Science. 386 (6723): 802–810. Bibcode:2024Sci...386..802M. doi:10.1126/science.adl0666. PMC 11588385. PMID 39541450.
- Vargas, Maxemiliano V.; Dunlap, Lee E.; Dong, Chunyang; Carter, Samuel J.; Tombari, Robert J.; Jami, Shekib A.; Cameron, Lindsay P.; Patel, Seona D.; Hennessey, Joseph J.; Saeger, Hannah N.; McCorvy, John D.; Gray, John A.; Tian, Lin; Olson, David E. (17 February 2023). "Psychedelics promote neuroplasticity through the activation of intracellular 5-HT2A receptors". Science. 379 (6633): 700–706. Bibcode:2023Sci...379..700V. doi:10.1126/science.adf0435. PMC 10108900. PMID 36795823. S2CID 256901481.
- Dong, Chunyang; Ly, Calvin; Dunlap, Lee E.; Vargas, Maxemiliano V.; Sun, Junqing; Hwang, In-Wook; Azinfar, Arya; Oh, Won Chan; Wetsel, William C.; Olson, David E.; Tian, Lin (13 May 2021). "Psychedelic-inspired drug discovery using an engineered biosensor". Cell. 184 (10): 2779–2792.e18. doi:10.1016/j.cell.2021.03.043. PMC 8122087. PMID 33915107.
- Cameron, Lindsay P.; Tombari, Robert J.; Lu, Ju; Pell, Alexander J.; Hurley, Zefan Q.; Ehinger, Yann; Vargas, Maxemiliano V.; McCarroll, Matthew N.; Taylor, Jack C.; Myers-Turnbull, Douglas; Liu, Taohui; Yaghoobi, Bianca; Laskowski, Lauren J.; Anderson, Emilie I.; Zhang, Guoliang; Viswanathan, Jayashri; Brown, Brandon M.; Tjia, Michelle; Dunlap, Lee E.; Rabow, Zachary T.; Fiehn, Oliver; Wulff, Heike; McCorvy, John D.; Lein, Pamela J.; Kokel, David; Ron, Dorit; Peters, Jamie; Zuo, Yi; Olson, David E. (January 2021). "A non-hallucinogenic psychedelic analogue with therapeutic potential". Nature. 589 (7842): 474–479. Bibcode:2021Natur.589..474C. doi:10.1038/s41586-020-3008-z. PMC 7874389. PMID 33299186.
- Dunlap, Lee E.; Azinfar, Arya; Ly, Calvin; Cameron, Lindsay P.; Viswanathan, Jayashri; Tombari, Robert J.; Myers-Turnbull, Douglas; Taylor, Jack C.; Grodzki, Ana Cristina; Lein, Pamela J.; Kokel, David; Olson, David E. (13 February 2020). "Identification of Psychoplastogenic N , N -Dimethylaminoisotryptamine (isoDMT) Analogues through Structure–Activity Relationship Studies". Journal of Medicinal Chemistry. 63 (3): 1142–1155. doi:10.1021/acs.jmedchem.9b01404. PMC 7075704. PMID 31977208.
- Cameron, Lindsay P.; Benson, Charlie J.; DeFelice, Brian C.; Fiehn, Oliver; Olson, David E. (17 July 2019). "Chronic, Intermittent Microdoses of the Psychedelic N , N -Dimethyltryptamine (DMT) Produce Positive Effects on Mood and Anxiety in Rodents". ACS Chemical Neuroscience. 10 (7): 3261–3270. doi:10.1021/acschemneuro.8b00692. PMC 6639775. PMID 30829033.
- Ly, Calvin; Greb, Alexandra C.; Cameron, Lindsay P.; Wong, Jonathan M.; Barragan, Eden V.; Wilson, Paige C.; Burbach, Kyle F.; Soltanzadeh Zarandi, Sina; Sood, Alexander; Paddy, Michael R.; Duim, Whitney C.; Dennis, Megan Y.; McAllister, A. Kimberley; Ori-McKenney, Kassandra M.; Gray, John A.; Olson, David E. (12 June 2018). "Psychedelics Promote Structural and Functional Neural Plasticity". Cell Reports. 23 (11): 3170–3182. doi:10.1016/j.celrep.2018.05.022. PMC 6082376. PMID 29898390.

== See also ==
- List of psychedelic chemists
