= Psychoplastogen =

Drugs that promote rapid and sustained neuroplasticity

- Drug class

Class identifiers
- Synonyms: Neuroplastogen
- Use: Medical, microdosing
- Mechanism of action: Various
- Biological target: Various
- Chemical class: Various

Legal status
- Legal status: Variable

Psychoplastogens, also known as plastogens (categorically) or neuroplastogens (nonhallucinogenic plastogens), are a group of small-molecule drugs that produce rapid and sustained effects on neuronal structure and function, intended to manifest therapeutic benefit after a single administration.

Existing psychoplastogens with demonstrated therapeutic effects include ketamine, MDMA, scopolamine, and the serotonergic psychedelics, including LSD, psilocin (the active metabolite of psilocybin), DMT, and 5-MeO-DMT.

Such compounds are under development for brain disorders, including depression, addiction, and PTSD. The ability to rapidly promote neuronal changes via mechanisms of neuroplasticity was recently discovered as the common therapeutic activity and mechanism of action.

== Etymology ==
The term psychoplastogen comes from the Greek roots psych- (mind), -plast (molded), and -gen (producing), and covers a variety of chemotypes and receptor targets. It was coined by David E. Olson in collaboration with Valentina Popescu, both at the University of California, Davis in their 2018 publication.

The term neuroplastogen is used as a synonym for certain types of plastogens, especially when speaking to the biological effects. This term is used to describe nonhallucinogenic plastogens, and delineates those compounds that promote rapid, sustained, structural plasticity without the mind-altering effects of the psychoplastogens.

== Chemistry ==
Plastogens come in a variety of chemotypes and chemical families, but, by definition, are small-molecule drugs. Ketamine has been described as, "the prototypical psychoplastogen".

== Pharmacology ==
Psychoplastogens exert their effects by promoting structural and functional neural plasticity through diverse targets including, but not limited to, 5-HT_{2A}, NMDA, and muscarinic receptors. Some are biased agonists. While each compound may have a different receptor binding profile, signaling appears to converge at the tyrosine kinase B (TrkB) and mammalian target of rapamycin (mTOR) pathways. Convergence at TrkB and mTOR parallels that of traditional antidepressants with known efficacies, but with more rapid onset. Although many serotonin 5-HT_{2A} receptor agonists are known to produce psychoplastogenic effects, serotonin itself is not psychoplastogenic owing to poor lipophilicity and inability to activate intracellular serotonin 5-HT_{2A} receptors.

Due to their rapid and sustained effects, psychoplastogens could potentially be dosed intermittently. In addition to the neuroplasticity effects, these compounds can have other epiphenomena including sedation, dissociation, and hallucinations.

Psychedelics show complex effects on neuroplasticity and can both promote and inhibit neuroplasticity depending on the circumstances. Single doses of DMT, 5-MeO-DMT, psilocybin, and DOI have been found to produce robust and long-lasting increases in neuroplasticity in animals. Likewise, repeated doses of LSD for 7 days increased neuroplasticity. However, chronic intermittent administration of DMT for several weeks resulted in dendritic spine retraction, suggesting physiological homeostatic compensation in response to overstimulation. In addition, DOI has been found to decrease brain-derived neurotrophic factor (BDNF) levels in the hippocampus. The effects of psychedelics on neuroplasticity appear to be dependent on serotonin 5-HT_{2A} receptor activation, as they are abolished in 5-HT_{2A} receptor knockout mice. Nonhallucinogenic serotonin 5-HT_{2A} receptor agonists, like tabernanthalog and lisuride, have also been found to increase neuroplasticity, and to a magnitude comparable to psychedelics.

In terms of neurogenesis, DOI and LSD showed no impact on hippocampal neurogenesis, while psilocybin and 25I-NBOMe decreased hippocampal neurogenesis. 5-MeO-DMT however has been found to increase hippocampal neurogenesis, and this could be blocked by sigma σ_{1} receptor antagonists.

Certain psychedelics such as LSD and psilocin have been reported to act as highly potent positive allosteric modulators of the tropomyosin receptor kinase B (TrkB), one of the receptors of brain-derived neurotrophic factor (BDNF). In addition to serotonin 5-HT_{2A} receptor agonism, this action has been implicated as a possible contributor to the psychoplastogenic effects of these psychedelics. However, subsequent studies did not reproduce these findings and instead reported no interaction of LSD or psilocin with TrkB.

NMDA receptor modulators have also been explored in this vein. Zelquistinel, an NMDA receptor modulator, has shown rapid onset and sustained duration of action after just one administration in animal studies.

Psychoplastogens describe what some call "event-driven pharmacology" a term originally used to describe targeted protein degraders.

== Clinical development ==
Several psychoplastogens have either been approved (ketamine, spravato) or are in development for the treatment of a variety of brain disorders associated with neuronal atrophy where neuroplasticity can elicit beneficial effects (psilocybin, DMT, zalsupindole, etc.).

Esketamine, sold under the brand name Spravato and produced by Janssen Pharmaceuticals, was approved by the FDA in March 2019 for the treatment of Treatment-Resistant Depression (TRD) and suicidal ideation. As of 2022, it is the only psychoplastogen approved in the US for the treatment of a neuropsychiatric disorder. Esketamine is the S(+) enantiomer of ketamine and functions as an NMDA receptor antagonist.

Other psychoplastogens that are being investigated in the clinic include:

- MDMA-assisted psychotherapy is being investigated for treatment of PTSD. A recent placebo controlled Phase 3 trial found that 67% of participants in the MDMA+therapy group no longer met the diagnostic criteria for PTSD whereas 32% of those in the placebo+therapy group no longer met PTSD threshold. MDMA-assisted psychotherapy is also currently in Phase 2 trials for eating disorders, anxiety associated with life-threatening illness, and social anxiety in autistic adults.
- Psilocybin, a compound in psilocybin mushrooms that serves as a prodrug for psilocin, is currently being investigated in clinical trials of Hallucinogen-Assisted Therapy for a variety of neuropsychiatric disorders. To date studies have explored the utility of psilocybin in a variety of diseases, including TRD, smoking addiction, and anxiety and depression in people with cancer diagnoses.
- LSD is being tested in phase 2 trials for cluster headaches and anxiety.
- DMT is being studied for depression.
- 5-MeO-DMT is being studied for depression and eating disorders.
- Ibogaine and noribogaine are being studied for addiction.
- JRT, a nonhallucinogenic analog of LSD, is being studied for depression.

== List of psychoplastogens ==
=== Hallucinogenic ===
- Substituted tryptamines: psilocin, psilocybin, 4-AcO-DMT, deupsilocin, MSP-1014, DMT, bretisilocin, deudimethyltryptamine, 5-MeO-DMT, 4-HO-DiPT, luvesilocin, and 5-MeO-MiPT
- Substituted isotryptamines: 6-MeO-isoDMT
- Substituted ergolines: LSD and lisuride
- Substituted phenethylamines: DOI, MDMA, (R)-MDMA, methylone, mescaline, MEAI, and LPH-5
- Arylcyclohexylamines: ketamine, esketamine, arketamine, hydroxynorketamine, methoxyketamine, and blixeprodil (GM-1020)
- Iboga-type alkaloids: ibogaine, noribogaine, tabernanthine, and tabernanthalog (DLX-007)
- Tropomyosin receptor kinase positive allosteric modulators: ACD855 (ponazuril) and ACD856
- Other: scopolamine, isoflurane, tropoflavin (7,8-DHF, including R7 and R13), LY-341495, and elunetirom

=== Nonhallucinogenic (Note: Nonhallucinogenic psychoplastogens are also referred to as neuroplastogens.) ===
- Substituted tryptamines: 6-MeO-DMT, DLX-159, and EB-003
- Substituted isotryptamines: 5-MeO-isoDMT, JRT, and zalsupindole (DLX-001 or AAZ-A-154)
- Substituted ergolines: BOL-148
- Corticosteroids (e.g., hydrocortisone and dexamethasone; single or acute exposure)
- Undisclosed: DLX-2270

== See also ==
- List of investigational hallucinogens and entactogens
- Neuroplasticity
- List of psychedelic pharmaceutical companies
