= Rs7997012 =

SNP: rs7997012
- Gene: HTR2A
- Chromosome: 13
- Region: Intron 2

External databases
- Ensembl: Human SNPView
- dbSNP: 7997012
- HapMap: 7997012
- SNPedia: 7997012

In genetics, rs7997012 is a gene variation—a single nucleotide polymorphism (SNP)—in intron 2 of the human HTR2A gene that codes for the 5-HT_{2A} receptor. The SNP varies between adenine (A) and guanine (G) DNA bases with the G-allele being most frequent. A research study found it to be related to antidepressant treatment. The research group reported that a polymorphism (rs1954787) on another gene, the GRIK4, has also shown a treatment-response-association in this kind of treatment. In a Japanese study rs7997012 was not associated with either major depressive disorder or bipolar disorder.

Rs6311, rs6313 and His452Tyr (rs6314) are other SNPs in the HTR2A gene. There are many more, even in intron 2 alone.
