= Rs6313 =

Single nucleotide polymorphism in human HTR2A gene

SNP: rs6313
- Name(s): T102C, 102T/C, C102T, 102C/T, g.102T>C
- Gene: HTR2A
- Chromosome: 13
- Region: Exon 1

External databases
- Ensembl: Human SNPView
- dbSNP: 6313
- HapMap: 6313
- SNPedia: 6313
- ALFRED: SI000324J
- AlzGene: Meta-analysis; Overview
- SzGene: Meta-analysis; Overview

In genetics, rs6313 also called T102C or C102T is a gene variation—a single nucleotide polymorphism (SNP)—in the human HTR2A gene that codes for the 5-HT_{2A} receptor. The SNP is a synonymous substitution located in exon 1 of the gene where it is involved in coding the 34th amino acid as serine.

As 5-HT_{2A} is a neuroreceptor the SNP has been investigated in connection with brain functions and neuropsychiatric disorders, and it is perhaps the most investigated SNP for its gene. Two other SNPs in HTR2A have also received much attention: rs6311 and His452Tyr (rs6314). The T102C polymorphism has been shown to be in complete linkage disequilibrium with the rs6311 (A-1438G). A less well investigated SNP of this gene is rs7997012.

Meta-analyses seem to indicate that the SNP is directly associated with schizophrenia, with Alzheimer's disease, and two initial studies seem to indicate that it is not associated with Parkinson's disease.

There have been multiple studies of the effect of this SNP on clozapine treatment response in schizophrenia. A meta-analysis published in 1998 found an association.

== Individual studies ==
Many individual studies have been done to investigate possible effects of the rs6313 polymorphism on phenotypes such as personality traits or disorders and their endophenotypes.

The C-allele has been associated with higher extraversion personality scores among borderline personality disorder patients and the presence of visual and auditory hallucinations in patients with late-onset Alzheimer's disease. Multiple studies have found that individuals with schizophrenia who are homozygous for the C-allele tend to do worse on working memory tasks than do individuals with a T-allele. Rs6313 has also been shown to be associated with novelty seeking among Italian mood disorder patients and reward dependence in a German population. The SNP may also be associated with rheumatoid arthritis. One study found no association between the SNP and suicidal behavior in a Chinese population, and another found no association with fibromyalgia syndrome.
