= Rs6314 =

SNP: rs6314
- Name(s): His452Tyr, H452Y
- Gene: HTR2A
- Chromosome: 13
- Region: Exon 3

External databases
- Ensembl: Human SNPView
- dbSNP: 6314
- HapMap: 6314
- SNPedia: 6314
- SzGene: Meta-analysis; Overview

In genetics, rs6314, also called His452Tyr or H452Y, is a gene variation, a single nucleotide polymorphism (SNP), in the HTR2A gene that codes for the 5-HT_{2A} receptor. The SNP is located in exon 3 of the gene and the change between C and T results in a change between histidine (His) and tyrosine (Tyr) at the 452nd amino acid, i.e., it is a missense substitution.

As 5-HT_{2A} is a neuroreceptor the SNP has been investigated in connection with neuropsychiatric disorders and other brain-related variables. A 2003 study looked at memory performance and found that His/His subjects performed better. Another study reported that the SNP had an effect on the memory performance in young adults. This has been replicated by another group.

The His452Tyr variant may influence cell signaling.

rs6311, rs6313 and rs7997012 are other investigated SNPs in the HTR2A gene.
