= Rs6311 =

SNP: rs6311
- Name(s): -1438G/A, -1438A/G, A-1438G, G-1438A
- Gene: HTR2A
- Chromosome: 13

External databases
- Ensembl: Human SNPView
- dbSNP: 6311
- HapMap: 6311
- SNPedia: 6311
- SzGene: Meta-analysis; Overview

In genetics, rs6311 is a gene variation—a single nucleotide polymorphism (SNP)—in the human HTR2A gene that codes for the 5-HT_{2A} receptor. 5-HT_{2A} is a neuroreceptor, and several scientific studies have investigated the effect of the genetic variation on personality, e.g., personality traits measured with the Temperament and Character Inventory or with a psychological task measuring impulsive behavior. The SNP has also been investigated in rheumatology studies.

Some research studies may refer to this gene variation as a C/T SNP, while others refer to it as a G/A polymorphism in the promoter region, thus writing it as, e.g., −1438 G/A or 1438G>A.

As of 2008, meta-analysis of research studies indicates that people with the A-allele may have slightly elevated risk of schizophrenia.

rs6313, rs6314, and rs7997012 are other investigated SNPs in the HTR2A gene.
