= Rs1954787 =

Single nucleotide polymorphism in the human GRIK4 gene

SNP: rs1954787
- Gene: GRIK4
- Chromosome: 11

External databases
- Ensembl: Human SNPView
- dbSNP: 1954787
- HapMap: 1954787
- SNPedia: 1954787

Rs1954787 is a gene variation, a single nucleotide polymorphism (SNP) in the GRIK4 gene. A study has reported that this polymorphism is associated with success of antidepressant treatment.
