= 5-HT2A receptor =

Subtype of serotonin receptor

HTR2A
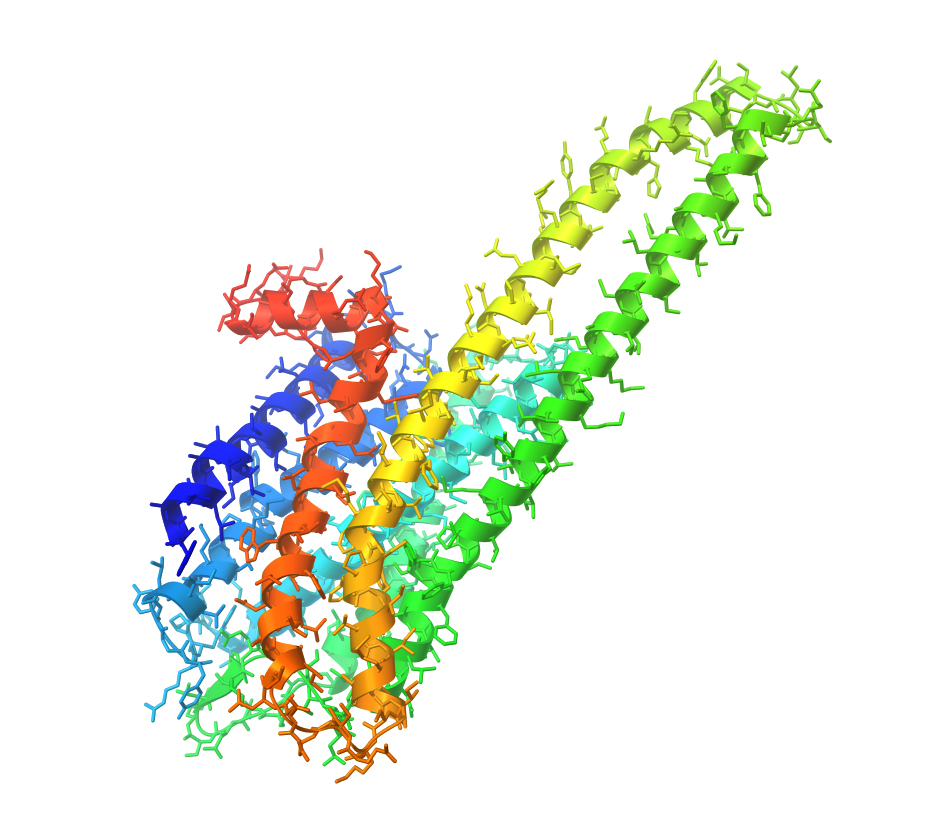

Identifiers
- Aliases: HTR2A, 5-HT2A, HTR2, 5-hydroxytryptamine receptor 2A
- External IDs: OMIM: 182135; MGI: 109521; GeneCards: HTR2A

Gene location (Human)
Chr.	Chromosome 13 (human)
Band	13q14.2	Start	46,831,546 bp
Band	13q14.2	End	46,897,076 bp
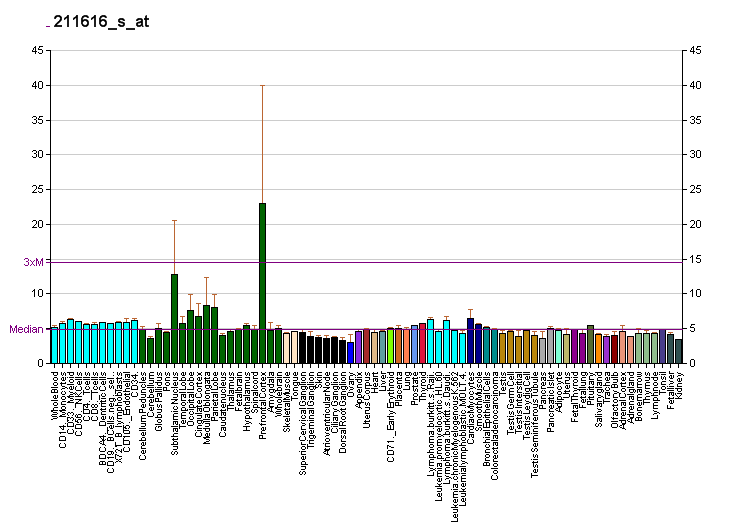

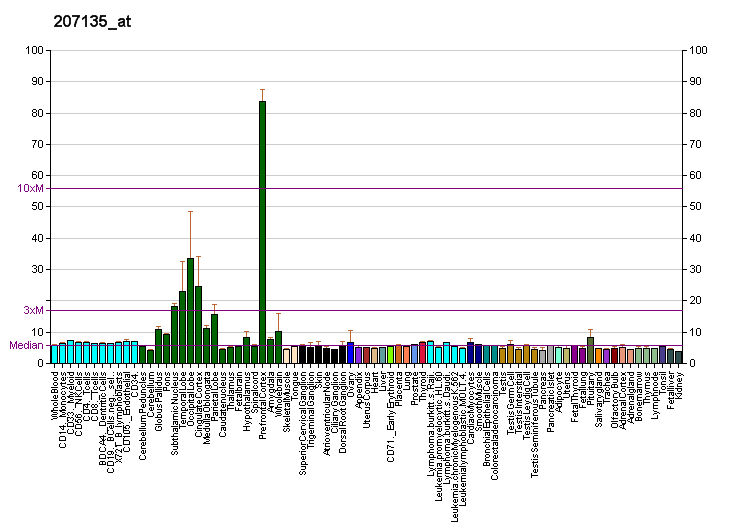
RNA expression pattern
Bgee	Human / Mouse (ortholog); Top expressed in: buccal mucosa cell; middle temporal gyrus; frontal pole; Brodmann area 23; Brodmann area 10; Brodmann area 46; endothelial cell; orbitofrontal cortex; superior frontal gyrus; primary visual cortex / n/a; More reference expression data
BioGPS	More reference expression data
Gene ontology
Molecular function	1-(4-iodo-2,5-dimethoxyphenyl)propan-2-amine binding; G protein-coupled receptor activity; virus receptor activity; signal transducer activity; G-protein alpha-subunit binding; G protein-coupled serotonin receptor activity; serotonin binding; neurotransmitter receptor activity; protein binding; protein-containing complex binding
Cellular component	cytoplasm; integral component of membrane; cytosol; cell projection; membrane; cell body fiber; integral component of plasma membrane; dendritic shaft; axon; soma; caveola; cytoplasmic vesicle; plasma membrane; dendrite; glutamatergic synapse; integral component of postsynaptic membrane; integral component of presynaptic membrane
Biological process	detection of mechanical stimulus involved in sensory perception of pain; release of sequestered calcium ion into cytosol; regulation of dopamine secretion; phospholipase C-activating serotonin receptor signaling pathway; urinary bladder smooth muscle contraction; positive regulation of MAP kinase activity; behavioral response to cocaine; positive regulation of cytosolic calcium ion concentration; positive regulation of kinase activity; positive regulation of phosphatidylinositol biosynthetic process; ageing; cellular calcium ion homeostasis; cell death; memory; activation of phospholipase C activity; detection of temperature stimulus involved in sensory perception of pain; protein localization to cytoskeleton; sleep; positive regulation of vasoconstriction; positive regulation of cell population proliferation; negative regulation of potassium ion transport; positive regulation of ERK1 and ERK2 cascade; artery smooth muscle contraction; positive regulation of peptidyl-tyrosine phosphorylation; viral entry into host cell; phosphatidylinositol 3-kinase signaling; sensory perception of pain; temperature homeostasis; viral process; positive regulation of fat cell differentiation; positive regulation of glycolytic process; negative regulation of synaptic transmission, glutamatergic; signal transduction; chemical synaptic transmission; serotonin receptor signaling pathway; phospholipase C-activating G protein-coupled receptor signaling pathway; G protein-coupled receptor signaling pathway; animal behavior; regulation of synaptic vesicle exocytosis; G protein-coupled receptor signaling pathway, coupled to cyclic nucleotide second messenger
Sources:Amigo / QuickGO
Orthologs
Databases	NCBI: entry; OMA: entry
Species	Human	Mouse
Entrez	3356	15558
Ensembl	ENSG00000102468	ENSMUSG00000034997
UniProt	P28223	P35363
RefSeq (mRNA)	NM_001165947; NM_000621; NM_001378924	NM_172812
RefSeq (protein)	NP_000612; NP_001159419; NP_001365853	NP_766400
Location (UCSC)	Chr 13: 46.83 – 46.9 Mb	n/a
PubMed search
- Wikidata
View/Edit Human	View/Edit Mouse

The 5-HT_{2A} receptor is a subtype of the 5-HT_{2} receptor that belongs to the serotonin receptor family and functions as a G protein-coupled receptor (GPCR). It is a cell surface receptor that activates multiple intracellular signalling cascades. Like all 5-HT_{2} receptors, the 5-HT_{2A} receptor is coupled to the G_{q}/G_{11} signaling pathway. It is the primary excitatory receptor subtype among the serotonin-responsive GPCRs. The 5-HT_{2A} receptor was initially noted for its central role as the primary target of serotonergic psychedelic drugs such as LSD and psilocybin mushrooms. It later regained research prominence when found to mediate, at least in part, the effects of many antipsychotic drugs, particularly atypical antipsychotics.

== History ==
The serotonin receptors were split into two classes by John Gaddum and Picarelli in 1957 when it was discovered that some of the serotonin-induced changes in the gut could be blocked by morphine, while the remainder of the response was inhibited by dibenzyline (phenoxybenzamine), leading to the naming of M and D receptors, respectively. The 5-HT_{2A} receptor is thought to correspond to what was originally described as D subtype of serotonin receptors by Gaddum and Picarelli.

In the era before molecular cloning, when radioligand binding and displacement was the only major tool, spiperone and LSD were shown to label two different 5-HT receptors, and neither of them displaced morphine, leading to naming of the 5-HT_{1}, 5-HT_{2} and 5-HT_{3} receptors, corresponding to high affinity sites from LSD, spiperone and morphine, respectively. Later, it was shown that the 5-HT_{2} receptor was very close to the 5-HT_{1C} receptor and they were thus were grouped together, renaming the 5-HT_{2} receptor into 5-HT_{2A} receptor and the 5-HT_{1C} receptor into the 5-HT_{2C} receptor. Thus, the 5-HT_{2} receptor family is composed of three separate molecular entities: the 5-HT_{2A} (formerly known as 5-HT_{2} or D), the 5-HT_{2B} (formerly known as 5-HT_{2F}) and the 5-HT_{2C} (formerly known as 5-HT_{1C}) receptors.

The serotonin 5-HT_{2A} receptor was identified via radioligand binding in 1978 by Leysen and colleagues. Peroutka and Snyder identified two distinct serotonin receptors and named them the 5-HT_{1} receptor and 5-HT_{2} receptor in 1979. Later, both of these receptors were found to have several subtypes, including the serotonin 5-HT_{2A} receptor. The serotonin 5-HT_{2A} receptor was characterized as a membrane protein by Wouters and colleagues in 1985. The gene encoding the rat serotonin 5-HT_{2A} receptor, HTR2A, was cloned in 1988 by Pritchett and colleagues. The human gene was cloned by Branchek and colleagues in 1990.

== Gene ==
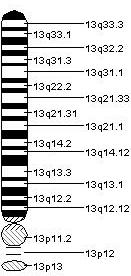
Chromosome 13.

The 5-HT_{2A} receptors is coded by the HTR2A gene. In humans the gene is located on chromosome 13. The gene has previously been called just HTR2 until the description of two related genes HTR2B and HTR2C. Several interesting polymorphisms have been identified for HTR2A: A-1438G (rs6311), C102T (rs6313), and His452Tyr (rs6314). Many more polymorphisms exist for the gene. A 2006 paper listed 255.

Probable role in fibromyalgia as the T102C polymorphisms of the gene 5HT2A were common in fibromyalgia patients.

Human HTR2A gene is thought to consist of 3 introns and 4 exons and to overlap with human gene HTR2A-AS1 which consists of 18 exons. There are over 200 organisms that have orthologs with the human HTR2A. Currently, the best documented orthologs for HTR2A gene are the mouse, and zebrafish. There are 8 paralogs for the HTR2A gene. The HTR2A gene is known to interact and activate G-protein genes such as GNA14, GNAI1, GNAI3, GNAQ, and GNAZ. These interactions are critical for cell signaling and homeostasis in many organisms.

In human brain tissue, regulation of HTR2A varies depending on the region: frontal cortex, amygdala, thalamus, brain stem and cerebellum. In a paper from 2016, they found that HTR2A undergoes a variety of different splicing events, including utilization of alternative splice acceptor sites, exon skipping, rare exon usage, and intron retention.

=== Transcriptional regulation ===
There are a few mechanisms of regulation for HTR2A gene such regulated by DNA methylation at particular transcript binding sites. Another mechanism for the correct regulation of gene expression is achieved through alternative splicing. This is a co-transcriptional process, which allows the generation of multiple forms of mRNA transcript from a single coding unit and is emerging as an important control point for gene expression. In this process, exons or introns can be either included or excluded from precursor-mRNA resulting in multiple mature mRNA variants. These mRNA variants result in different isoforms which may have antagonistic functions or differential expression patterns, yielding plasticity and adaptability to the cells. One study found that the common genetic variant rs6311 regulates expression of HTR2A transcripts containing the extended 5' UTR.

== Tissue distribution ==
5-HT_{2A} is expressed widely throughout the central nervous system (CNS). It is expressed near most of the serotonergic terminal rich areas, including neocortex (mainly prefrontal, parietal, and somatosensory cortex) and the olfactory tubercle. Especially high concentrations of this receptor on the apical dendrites of pyramidal cells in layer V of the cortex may modulate cognitive processes, working memory, and attention by enhancing glutamate release followed by a complex range of interactions with the 5-HT_{1A}, GABA_{A}, adenosine A_{1}, AMPA, mGluR_{2/3}, mGlu5, and OX_{2} receptors. In the rat cerebellum, the protein has also been found in the Golgi cells of the granular layer, and in the Purkinje cells.

In the periphery, it is highly expressed in platelets and many cell types of the cardiovascular system, in fibroblasts, and in neurons of the peripheral nervous system. Additionally, 5-HT_{2A} mRNA expression has been observed in human monocytes. Whole-body distribution of the 5-HT_{2A/2C} receptor agonist, [11C]Cimbi-36 show uptake in several internal organs and brown adipose tissue (BAT), but it is not clear if this represents specific 5-HT_{2A} receptor binding.

== Structure ==
The 5-HT_{2A} receptor is a member of the class A (rhodopsin-like) G protein-coupled receptor (GPCR) family, characterized by seven transmembrane α-helices connected by extracellular and intracellular loops. Its ligand-binding pocket is composed of two adjacent subpockets: the orthosteric binding pocket (OBP) and an extended binding pocket (EBP), with a unique side-extended cavity near the orthosteric site that distinguishes it from related receptors. Ligands are anchored primarily through a conserved aspartate residue (D155^3.32) that interacts with their charged amine groups, while additional interactions involve hydrophobic contacts and hydrogen bonds with residues in both the OBP and EBP. Structural studies reveal that the receptor undergoes significant conformational changes upon activation, particularly in transmembrane helices 3 and 6, which facilitate G protein coupling and signal transduction. The extracellular ligand-binding pocket is closed by a flexible "lid," and the intracellular region includes a short helix (H8) stabilized by π-stacking interactions, both of which contribute to the receptor's dynamic conformational landscape. These structural features underlie the receptor's ability to recognize diverse ligands and mediate complex signaling behaviors.

The cryo-EM structures of the serotonin 5-HT_{2A} receptor with a variety of serotonin 5-HT_{2A} receptor agonists, including the tryptamines serotonin (neurotransmitter and endogenous agonist), psilocin (psychedelic), and dimethyltryptamine (DMT) (psychedelic), the lysergamides LSD (psychedelic) and 2-bromo-LSD (BOL-148) (non-hallucinogenic), and the phenethylamines mescaline (psychedelic) and RS130-180 (β-arrestin-biased agonist with unknown hallucinogenic potential), have been solved and published by Bryan Roth and colleagues.

== Function ==
The 5-HT_{2A} receptor is a subtype of serotonin receptor that plays a critical role in the central nervous system, particularly in regions involved in cognition, learning, and memory. It is highly expressed in the cerebral cortex, especially in layer V pyramidal neurons and certain interneurons, where it modulates thalamocortical information processing and may influence gamma oscillations, which are important for sensory integration and perception. Functionally, the 5-HT_{2A} receptor is a G protein-coupled receptor (GPCR) that primarily signals through the phospholipase C (PLC) pathway, leading to the production of inositol triphosphate (IP3) and diacylglycerol, but it can also activate other signaling cascades such as arachidonic acid and 2-arachidonylglycerol pathways. Notably, the receptor exhibits "functional selectivity," meaning different ligands can differentially activate these signaling pathways, which is relevant for the distinct effects of hallucinogens, antipsychotics, and antidepressants that target the receptor. Activation of the 5-HT2A receptor by agonists is associated with enhanced cognition and hallucinogenic effects, while antagonists have antipsychotic and antidepressant properties. Dysregulation of 5-HT_{2A} receptor function has been implicated in psychiatric disorders such as depression, schizophrenia, and drug addiction. Additionally, the receptor undergoes unique regulatory processes, including desensitization and internalization that are partly independent of β-arrestin, further distinguishing it from other GPCRs and influencing its response to long-term pharmacological modulation.

=== Signaling cascade ===
The 5-HT_{2A} receptor is known primarily to couple to the Gα_{q} signal transduction pathway. Upon receptor stimulation with agonist, Gα_{q} and β-γ subunits dissociate to initiate downstream effector pathways. Gα_{q} stimulates phospholipase C (PLC) activity, which subsequently promotes the release of diacylglycerol (DAG) and inositol triphosphate (IP3), which in turn stimulate protein kinase C (PKC) activity and Ca^{2+} release.

=== Effects ===
Physiological processes mediated by the receptor include:

- CNS: neuronal excitation, hallucinations, out-of-body experiences, and fear. Primarily responsible for the psychedelic effects associated with 5-HT_{2A} receptor agonists such as LSD, DMT, etc.
- Activation of the 5-HT_{2A} receptor with 2,5-dimethoxy-4-iodoamphetamine (DOI) produces potent anti-inflammatory effects in several tissues including cardiovascular and gut. Other 5-HT_{2A} agonists like LSD also have potent anti-inflammatory effects against TNF-alpha-induced inflammation.
- Activation of the 5-HT_{2A} receptor in hypothalamus causes increases in hormonal levels of oxytocin, prolactin, ACTH, corticosterone, and renin.
- Role in memory and learning.
- Role in arthralgia.
- Role in Alzheimer's disease.
- Smooth muscle contraction in the gut.
- Probable role in sleep paralysis.
- Probable role in aging.

== Ligands ==
=== Agonists ===
Activation of the 5-HT_{2A} receptor is necessary for the effects of the "classic" psychedelics like LSD, psilocin and mescaline, which act as full or partial agonists at this receptor, and represent the three main classes of 5-HT_{2A} agonists, the ergolines, tryptamines and phenethylamines, respectively. A very large family of derivatives from these three classes has been developed, and their structure-activity relationships have been extensively researched. Agonists acting at 5-HT_{2A} receptors located on the apical dendrites of pyramidal cells within regions of the prefrontal cortex are believed to mediate hallucinogenic activity. Some findings reveal that psychoactive effects of classic psychedelics are mediated by the receptor heterodimer 5-HT_{2A}–mGlu2 and not by monomeric 5-HT_{2A} receptors. However, newer research suggests that 5HT_{2A} and mGlu2 receptors do not physically associate with each other, so the former findings have questionable relevance. Agonists enhance dopamine in PFC, enhance memory and play an active role in attention and learning.

Serotonin 5-HT_{2A} receptor agonists include serotonergic psychedelics and non-hallucinogenic agents. Psychedelics have widely been encountered as recreational drug or drugs of misuse, with potential clinical consequences such as overdose, hospitalization, bad trips and worsened mental health, and rare adverse effects such as seizures, psychosis, and hallucinogen persisting perception disorder (HPPD). On the other hand, psychedelics and non-hallucinogenic serotonin 5-HT_{2A} receptor agonists are under development as novel treatments for psychiatric disorders like depression, anxiety, and addiction as well as other conditions like cluster headaches. Both psychedelics and non-hallucinogenic serotonin 5-HT_{2A} receptor agonists are claimed to act as psychoplastogens and this might be involved in their therapeutic effects.

==== Anti-inflammatory effects ====
Various serotonergic psychedelics, acting as serotonin 5-HT_{2A} receptor agonists, have been found to be highly potent and efficacious anti-inflammatory and immunomodulatory agents in preclinical research (i.e., animal and in-vitro studies). In contrast to corticosteroids however, psychedelics with anti-inflammatory effects do not appear to suppress the immune system. Some psychedelics have been found to be far more potent in their anti-inflammatory effects than in their psychedelic effects. For instance, (R)-DOI is 30- to >50-fold more potent in producing anti-inflammatory effects than in producing psychedelic-like behavioral effects in animal research. Psilocin, the active form of psilocybin, has similar anti-inflammatory potency as (R)-DOI.

The potencies of psychedelics and other serotonin 5-HT_{2A} receptor agonists as anti-inflammatory drugs vary, with 2C-I, DOIB, 2C-B, 4-HO-DiPT, DOI, 2,5-DMA, DOET, DOM, psilocin, and 2C-H being highly potent and fully efficacious anti-inflammatories; TMA-2, 2C-B-Fly, TCB-2, ETH-LAD, LSD, and 2C-T-33 being partially efficacious anti-inflammatories; and lisuride, 1-methylpsilocin, 5-MeO-DMT, and DMT having negligible efficacy. Although DMT and 5-MeO-DMT lack appreciable anti-inflammatory efficacy via the serotonin 5-HT_{2A} receptor, both have been reported to modulate inflammatory responses in human dendritic cells via the sigma σ_{1} receptor. Both non-hallucinogenic agents with full anti-inflammatory effects, such as 2,5-DMA, and non-anti-inflammatory agents with full psychedelic effects, such as DOTFM, are known. Hence, the psychedelic and anti-inflammatory effects of serotonin 5-HT_{2A} receptor agonists appear to be fully dissociable. These effects appear to be mediated by different intracellular signaling pathways, although the exact pathways are unclear.

Serotonin 5-HT_{2A} receptor agonists with anti-inflammatory effects but reduced psychedelic effects, such as 2C-iBu (ELE-02), are under development for the potential treatment of inflammatory conditions. They may also have applications in the treatment of neuroinflammation. The anti-inflammatory effects of psychedelics might be involved in the claimed effects of psychedelic microdosing. Relatedly, LSD microdosing is being studied in the treatment of Alzheimer's disease specifically for its anti-inflammatory effects.

==== Full agonists ====
- 25B-NBOMe – also known as Cimbi-36; used as a PET imaging tool for visualizing the 5-HT_{2A} receptor
- 25I-NBOH and its 2-methoxy-analog 25I-NBOMe
- BMB-202 – highly selective
- ^{18}F FECIMBI-36 – radiolabelled agonist ligand for mapping 5-HT_{2A} / 5-HT_{2C} receptor distribution
- 5-Methoxytryptamine – full agonist to several serotonin receptors.
- O-4310 – 5-HT_{2A} selective, claimed to have 100× selectivity over 5-HT_{2C} and be inactive at 5-HT_{2B}
- PHA-57378 – dual 5-HT_{2A} / 5-HT_{2C} agonist, anxiolytic effects in animal studies.
- TCB-2

==== Partial agonists ====
- 25C-NBOMe
- 25CN-NBOH – 100× selectivity for 5-HT_{2A} over 5-HT_{2C}, 46× selectivity over 5-HT_{2B}.
- 3-Carboxy indole PB-22 (1-pentyl-indole-3-carboxylic acid) – a metabolite of the synthetic cannabinoid PB-22, partial agonist at 5-HT_{2A}
- BMB-201 – non-hallucinogenic-like in animals
- Bromo-DragonFLY
- DMBMPP – a structurally constrained derivative of 25B-NBOMe, which acts as a potent partial agonist with 124× selectivity for 5-HT_{2A} over 5-HT_{2C}, making it the most selective agonist ligand identified to date.
- (R)-DOI – traditionally the most common 5-HT_{2A} reference agonist used in research
- Efavirenz – an antiretroviral drug, produces psychiatric side effects thought to be mediated by 5-HT_{2A}.
- IHCH-7113 – 5-HT_{2A} agonist derived by simplification of the 5-HT_{2A} antagonist antipsychotic lumateperone.
- Lisuride – an antiparkinson dopamine agonist of the ergoline class, that is also a dual 5-HT_{2A} / 5-HT_{2C} agonist and 5-HT_{2B} antagonist.
- Mefloquine – an antimalarial drug, also produces psychiatric side effects which may be mediated through 5-HT_{2A} and/or 5-HT_{2C} receptors.
- Methysergide – a congener of methylergonovine, used in treatment of migraine blocks 5-HT_{2A} and 5-HT_{2C} receptors, but sometimes acts as partial agonist, in some preparations.
- Piperidine derivatives such as OSU-6162, which acts as a partial agonist at both 5-HT_{2A} and dopamine D_{2} receptors, and Z3517967757.
- Quipazine – 5-HT_{2A} agonist but also potent 5-HT_{3} agonist.
- SN-22 – partial agonist at all three 5-HT_{2} subtypes
- Some benzazepines and similar compounds related to lorcaserin such as SCHEMBL5334361 are potent 5-HT_{2A} agonists as well as showing action at 5-HT_{2C}.
- Substituted tetrahydro-β-carboline
- Tetrahydropyridine derivatives such as (R)-69, Z4154032166 and WXVL_BT0793LQ2118.
- Zalsupindole (DLX-001; AAZ-A-154) – non-hallucinogenic but retains antidepressant effects in animals.

==== Selective agonists ====
- 25CN-NBOH
- BMB-202
- DMBMPP
- DOI-NBOMe
- LPH-5
- LPH-48
- Lysergine
- O-4310
- TGF-8027

==== Peripherally selective agonists ====
One effect of 5-HT_{2A} receptor activation is a reduction in intraocular pressure, and so 5-HT_{2A} agonists can be useful for the treatment of glaucoma. This has led to the development of compounds such as AL-34662 that are hoped to reduce pressure inside the eyes but without crossing the blood–brain barrier and producing hallucinogenic side effects. Animal studies with this compound showed it to be free of hallucinogenic effects at doses up to 30 mg/kg, although several of its more lipophilic analogues did produce the head-twitch response known to be characteristic of hallucinogenic effects in rodents. IHCH-8110 is a peripherally selective serotonin 5-HT_{2A} receptor agonist with beneficial effects against colorectal cancer in preclinical research.

=== Antagonists ===
Serotonin 5-HT_{2A} receptor antagonists, including many atypical antipsychotics, more selective agents like pimavanserin, and certain antidepressants and hypnotics like trazodone, mirtazapine, tricyclic antidepressants, and hydroxyzine, are used in the treatment of psychiatric disorders and other conditions such as depression, anxiety, psychosis, and insomnia. Ketanserin, a dual serotonin 5-HT_{2A} receptor antagonist and α_{1}-adrenergic receptor antagonist, is used as an antihypertensive agent. The non-selective serotonin 5-HT_{2A} receptor antagonist cyproheptadine is frequently used off-label to treat serotonin syndrome, albeit based on limited clinical evidence. Serotonin 5-HT_{2A} receptor antagonists like ketanserin have been used as psychedelic antidotes or "trip killers" to manage the hallucinogenic effects of serotonergic psychedelics.

==== List of antagonists ====
- 2-Alkyl-4-aryl-tetrahydro-pyrimido-azepines – subtype selective antagonists (35 g: 60-fold).
- 5-MeO-NBpBrT
- AMDA and related derivatives – family of selective 5-HT_{2A} antagonists.
- Atypical antipsychotics – e.g., quetiapine, and asenapine are relatively potent antagonists of 5-HT_{2A}
- Brexpiprazole – an atypical antipsychotic, is a potent antagonist at 5-HT_{2A} receptors (K_{i} = 0.47 nM in humans).
- Cariprazine
- Cyclobenzaprine – a strong antagonist of both 5-HT_{2A} and 5-HT_{2C} receptors
- Cyproheptadine
- Ergot alkaloids are mostly nonspecific 5-HT receptor antagonists, but a few ergot derivatives such as metergoline and nicergoline bind preferentially to members of the 5-HT_{2} receptor family.
- Hydroxyzine (Atarax) (minor effect)
- Ketanserin – The discovery of ketanserin was a landmark in the pharmacology of 5-HT_{2} receptors. Ketanserin, though capable of blocking 5-HT induced platelet adhesion, however does not mediate its well-known antihypertensive action through 5-HT_{2} receptor family, but through its high affinity for alpha_{1} adrenergic receptors. It also has high affinity for H_{1} histaminergic receptors equal to that at 5-HT_{2A} receptors. Compounds chemically related to ketanserin such as ritanserin are more selective 5-HT_{2A} receptor antagonists with low affinity for alpha-adrenergic receptors. However, ritanserin, like most other 5-HT_{2A} receptor antagonists, also potently inhibits 5-HT_{2C} receptors.
- Lumateperone
- LY-367,265 – dual 5-HT_{2A} antagonist / SSRI with antidepressant effects
- Nantenine
- Nefazodone – blocks post-synaptic 5-HT_{2A} receptors, and to a lesser extent inhibits pre-synaptic serotonin and norepinephrine reuptake.
- Niaprazine
- Opipramol – atypical antidepressant
- Pizotifen – a non-selective antagonist.
- Trazodone – a potent 5-HT_{2A} antagonist, as well as an antagonist on other serotonin receptors.
- Tetracyclic antidepressants – mianserin, mirtazapine, maprotiline
- Tricyclic antidepressants (TCAs) – e.g., amitriptyline, nortriptyline, amoxapine, clomipramine, doxepin, maprotiline, imipramine, iprindole
- Typical antipsychotics – e.g., haloperidol and chlorpromazine (minor)
- Volinanserin (MDL100907, M100907) – the most potent 5-HT_{2A} antagonist; underwent a few clinical trials but was ultimately never marketed.

==== Peripherally selective antagonists ====
- BW-501C67
- Irindalone – partial
- Sarpogrelate
- Xylamidine

==== Antagonists and cardiovascular disease ====
Increased 5-HT_{2A} expression is observed in patients with coronary thrombosis, and the receptor has been associated with processes that influence atherosclerosis. As the receptor is present in coronary arteries and capable of mediating vasoconstriction, 5-HT_{2A} has also been linked to coronary artery spasms. 5-HT antagonism, therefore, has potential in the prevention of cardiovascular disease, however, no studies have been published so far.

=== Inverse agonists ===
- AC-90179 – potent and selective inverse agonist at 5-HT_{2A}, also 5-HT_{2C} antagonist.
- Atypical antipsychotics – clozapine, iloperidone, olanzapine, paliperidone, risperidone
- Eplivanserin (Sanofi Aventis) – sleeping pill that reached phase II trials (but for which the application for approval was withdrawn), acts as a selective 5-HT_{2A} inverse agonist.
- Nelotanserin (APD-125) – selective 5-HT_{2A} inverse agonist developed by Arena Pharmaceuticals for the treatment of insomnia. APD-125 was shown to be effective and well tolerated in clinical trials.
- Pimavanserin (ACP-103) – more selective than AC-90179, orally active, antipsychotic in vivo, now FDA approved for the treatment of hallucinations and delusions associated with Parkinson's disease.

=== Positive allosteric modulators ===
Positive allosteric modulators of the serotonin 5-HT_{2A} receptor have been identified. These include CTW0404 and CTW0419. They selectively potentiated the serotonin 5-HT_{2A} receptor without affecting the serotonin 5-HT_{2B} and 5-HT_{2C} receptors. Unlike serotonin 5-HT_{2A} receptor agonists, they did not substitute for the serotonergic psychedelic (R)-DOI in drug discrimination tests and did not produce the head-twitch response, suggesting that they lack psychedelic effects. Instead, they blunted the (R)-DOI-induced head-twitch response. The (R)-enantiomer of glaucine has also been reported to be a serotonin 5-HT_{2A} receptor positive allosteric modulator. A dual serotonin 5-HT_{2C} and 5-HT_{2A} receptor positive allosteric modulator is the oleamide analogue JPC0323. Another selective serotonin 5-HT_{2A} receptor positive allosteric modulator is AB0124.

=== Functional selectivity ===
5-HT_{2A}-receptor ligands may differentially activate the transductional pathways (see above). Studies evaluated the activation of two effectors, PLC and PLA2, by means of their second messengers. Compounds displaying more pronounced functional selectivity are 2,5-DMA and 2C-N. The former induces IP accumulation without activating the PLA2 mediated response, while the latter elicits AA release without activating the PLC mediated response.

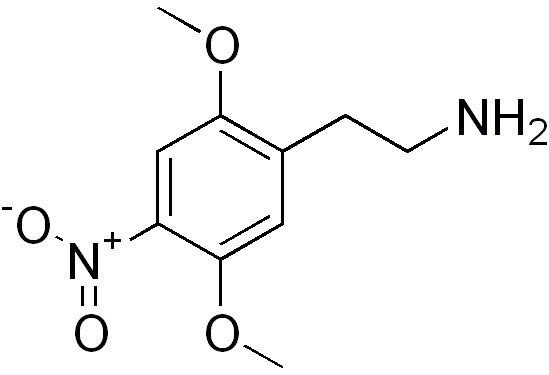

Recent research has suggested potential signaling differences within the somatosensory cortex between 5-HT_{2A} agonists that produce headshakes in the mouse and those that do not, such as lisuride, as these agents are also non-hallucinogenic in humans despite being active 5-HT_{2A} agonists. One known example of differences in signal transduction is between the two 5-HT_{2A} agonists serotonin and DOI that involves differential recruitment of intracellular proteins called β-arrestins, more specifically arrestin beta 2. Cyclopropylmethanamine derivatives such as (−)-19 have also been shown to act as 5-HT_{2A/2C} agonists with functional selectivity for Gq-mediated signaling compared with β-arrestin recruitment.

=== Serotonin-elevating drugs ===
Besides direct serotonin 5-HT_{2A} receptor agonists, many drugs elevate serotonin levels and indirectly activate serotonin 5-HT_{2A} receptors. Examples include antidepressants and anxiolytics such as selective serotonin reuptake inhibitors (SSRIs), serotonin–norepinephrine reuptake inhibitors (SNRIs), monoamine oxidase inhibitors (MAOIs), and serotonin precursors like tryptophan and 5-hydroxytryptophan (5-HTP). In addition, serotonin releasing agents (SRAs), including appetite suppressants like fenfluramine and chlorphentermine and entactogens like MDMA, elevate serotonin levels and indirectly activate serotonin 5-HT_{2A} receptors similarly. Serotonin 5-HT_{2A} receptor activation may be involved in the therapeutic effects of serotonin-elevating medications and appears to be importantly involved in the subjective effects of SRAs like MDMA. Serotonin-elevating drugs can cause serotonin syndrome under certain circumstances, for instance in overdose or with combination of multiple serotonergic drugs, and the serotonin 5-HT_{2A} receptor appears to be a key serotonin receptor in mediating this syndrome.

== Methods to analyse the receptor ==
The receptor can be analysed by neuroimaging, radioligand, genetic analysis, measurements of ion flows, and other ways.

=== Neuroimaging ===
The 5-HT_{2A} receptors may be imaged with PET-scanners using the fluorine-18-altanserin, MDL 100,907 or [^{11}C]Cimbi-36 radioligands that binds to the neuroreceptor, e.g., one study reported a reduced binding of altanserin particularly in the hippocampus in patients with major depressive disorder.

Altanserin uptake decreases with age reflecting a loss of specific 5-HT_{2A} receptors with age.

=== Other ===
Western blot with an affinity-purified antibody and examination of 5-HT_{2A} receptor protein samples by electrophoresis has been described. Immunohistochemical staining of 5-HT_{2A} receptors is also possible.

== Clinical significance ==
=== Associations with psychiatric disorders ===
Several studies have seen links between the -1438G/A polymorphism and mood disorders, such as major depressive disorder and a strong link with an odds ratio of 1.3 has been found between the T102C polymorphism and schizophrenia.

The T102C polymorphism has also been studied in relation to suicide attempts, with a study finding excess of the C/C genotype among the suicide attempters. A number of other studies were devoted to finding an association of the gene with schizophrenia, with diverging results.

These individual studies may, however, not give a full picture: A review from 2007 looking at the effect of different SNPs reported in separate studies stated that "genetic association studies [of HTR2A gene variants with psychiatric disorders] report conflicting and generally negative results" with no involvement, small or a not replicated role for the genetic variant of the gene.

Polymorphisms in the promoter gene coding Early growth response 3 (EGR3) are associated with schizophrenia. Studies have demonstrated a relationship between EGR3 and HTR2A, and schizophrenia-like behaviors in transgenic animals. Exactly how these results translate over to further biopsychological understanding of schizophrenia is still widely debated. There is some evidence that dysfunction of HTR2A can impact pharmacological interventions.

Several studies have assessed a relationship between 5-hydroxytryptamine (serotonin) 2A receptor (5-HTR2A) gene polymorphisms with an increased risk of suicidal behavior. One study revealed that T102C polymorphism is associated with suicidal behavior but other studies failed to replicate these findings and found no association between polymorphism and suicidal behavior.

==== Treatment response ====
Genetics seems also to be associated to some extent with the amount of adverse events in treatment of major depression disorder.

==== Associations with substance abuse ====
Polymorphisms in the 5-HT_{2A} receptor coding gene HTR2A (rs6313 and s6311) have been shown to have conflicting associations with alcohol misuse. For example, A polymorphism in the 5-HT_{2A} receptor coding gene HTR2A (rs6313) was reported to predict lower positive alcohol expectancy, higher refusal self-efficacy, and lower alcohol misuse in a sample of 120 young adults. However, this polymorphism did not moderate the linkages between impulsivity, cognition, and alcohol misuse. There are conflicting results as other studies have found associations between T102C polymorphisms alcohol misuse.

==== Drug impact on gene expression ====
There is some evidence that methylation patterns may contribute to relapse behaviors in people who use stimulants. In mice, psychotropic drugs such as DOI, LSD, DOM, and DOB which produced differing transcriptional patterns among several different brain regions.

== See also ==
- Ultra-large-scale docking
