= JPC0323 =

Clinical data
- Other names: JPC-0323; N-(1,3-Dihydroxy-2-(hydroxymethyl)propan-2-yl)oleamide
- Drug class: Serotonin 5-HT_{2C} and 5-HT_{2A} receptor positive allosteric modulator
- ATC code: None

Identifiers
- IUPAC name: (Z)-N-[1,3-dihydroxy-2-(hydroxymethyl)propan-2-yl]octadec-9-enamide
- CAS Number: 5972-45-2
- PubChem CID: 6453844
- ChemSpider: 4956192
- ChEMBL: ChEMBL5397931
- CompTox Dashboard (EPA): DTXSID201175111

Chemical and physical data
- Formula: C_{22}H_{43}NO_{4}
- Molar mass: 385.589 g·mol^{−1}
- 3D model (JSmol): Interactive image
- SMILES: CCCCCCCC/C=C\CCCCCCCC(=O)NC(CO)(CO)CO
- InChI: InChI=1S/C22H43NO4/c1-2-3-4-5-6-7-8-9-10-11-12-13-14-15-16-17-21(27)23-22(18-24,19-25)20-26/h9-10,24-26H,2-8,11-20H2,1H3,(H,23,27)/b10-9-; Key:JLFKELVBPUSMGW-KTKRTIGZSA-N

JPC0323, also known as N-(1,3-dihydroxy-2-(hydroxymethyl)propan-2-yl)oleamide, is a dual serotonin 5-HT_{2C} and 5-HT_{2A} receptor positive allosteric modulator related to oleamide. It showed negligible affinity for roughly 50 other targets and did not bind to the orthosteric sites of these receptors. The drug does not affect the serotonin 5-HT_{2B} receptor.

JPC0323 showed favorable pharmacokinetic properties in preclinical research. It produced hypolocomotion in a serotonin 5-HT_{2C} receptor-dependent but not serotonin 5-HT_{2A} receptor-dependent manner in rats, suggesting that it might be a preferential serotonin 5-HT_{2C} receptor positive allosteric modulator in vivo. The drug was not assessed in terms of head-twitch response, an animal behavioral proxy of psychedelic effects. It is unknown whether it might have hallucinogenic effects via serotonin 5-HT_{2A} receptor potentiation, but its developers speculated that it might have reduced potential in this regard compared to orthosteric agonists.

JPC0323 was derived as an analogue of the fatty acid amide oleamide and was first described in the scientific literature by 2023. It was described as a "first-in-class" dual serotonin 5-HT_{2C} and 5-HT_{2A} receptor positive allosteric modulator.

== See also ==
- 5-HT_{2C} receptor § Positive allosteric modulators
- 5-HT_{2A} receptor § Positive allosteric modulators
- AB0124 and CTW0404
