= C22H37NO2 =

The molecular formula C_{22}H_{37}NO_{2} (molar mass: 347.53 g/mol, exact mass: 347.2824 u) may refer to:

- Anandamide, also known as N-arachidonoylethanolamine (AEA)
- Virodhamine
