= Single-base extension =

Single-base extension (SBE) is a method for determining the identity of a nucleotide base at a specific position along a nucleic acid. The method is used to identify a single-nucleotide polymorphism (SNP).

In the method, an oligonucleotide primer hybridizes to a complementary region along the nucleic acid to form a duplex, with the primer’s terminal 3’-end directly adjacent to the nucleotide base to be identified. Using a DNA polymerase, the oligonucleotide primer is enzymatically extended by a single base in the presence of all four nucleotide terminators; the nucleotide terminator complementary to the base in the template being interrogated is incorporated and identified. The presence of all four terminators suppresses misincorporation of non-complementary nucleotides. Many approaches can be taken for determining the identity of an incorporated terminator, including fluorescence labeling, mass labeling for mass spectrometry, isotope labeling, and tagging the base with a hapten and detecting chromogenically with an anti-hapten antibody-enzyme conjugate (e.g., via an ELISA format).

The method was invented by Philip Goelet, Michael Knapp, Richard Douglas and Stephen Anderson while working at the company Molecular Tool. This approach was designed for high-throughput SNP genotyping and was originally called "Genetic Bit Analysis" (GBA). Illumina, Inc. utilizes this method in their Infinium technology to measure DNA methylation levels in the human genome.
