= Thyrotropin-releasing hormone receptor =

Protein-coding gene in the species Homo sapiens

TRHR

Identifiers
- Aliases: TRHR, TRH-R, thyrotropin releasing hormone receptor, CHNG7
- External IDs: OMIM: 188545; MGI: 98824; GeneCards: TRHR

Gene location (Human)
Chr.	Chromosome 8 (human)
Band	8q23.1	Start	109,086,585 bp
Band	8q23.1	End	109,121,565 bp

Gene location (Mouse)
Chr.	Chromosome 15 (mouse)
Band	15 B3.2|15 16.82 cM	Start	44,059,531 bp
Band	15 B3.2|15 16.82 cM	End	44,099,308 bp
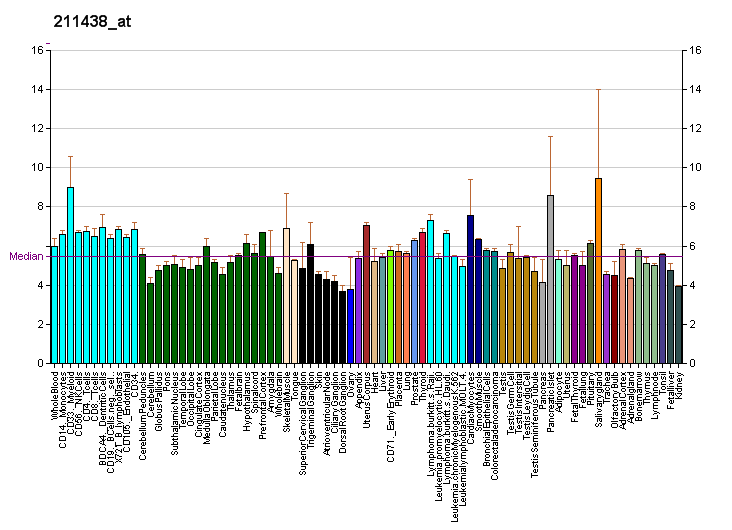
RNA expression pattern
Bgee	Human / Mouse (ortholog); Top expressed in: testicle; Achilles tendon; gonad; pituitary gland; anterior pituitary; ventricle of the heart; atrium; right auricle of heart; left ventricle; hippocampal formation / Top expressed in: facial motor nucleus; lumbar subsegment of spinal cord; anterior amygdaloid area; anterior horn of spinal cord; motor neuron; ventral tegmental area; urethra; nucleus accumbens; dentate gyrus of hippocampal formation granule cell; subiculum; More reference expression data
BioGPS	More reference expression data
Gene ontology
Molecular function	G protein-coupled receptor activity; signal transducer activity; thyrotropin-releasing hormone receptor activity
Cellular component	integral component of membrane; plasma membrane; integral component of plasma membrane; membrane
Biological process	signal transduction; G protein-coupled receptor signaling pathway
Sources:Amigo / QuickGO
Orthologs
Databases	NCBI: entry; OMA: entry
Species	Human	Mouse
Entrez	7201	22045
Ensembl	ENSG00000174417	ENSMUSG00000038760
UniProt	P34981	P21761
RefSeq (mRNA)	NM_003301	NM_013696
RefSeq (protein)	NP_003292	NP_038724
Location (UCSC)	Chr 8: 109.09 – 109.12 Mb	Chr 15: 44.06 – 44.1 Mb
PubMed search
- Wikidata
View/Edit Human	View/Edit Mouse

Thyrotropin-releasing hormone receptor (TRHR) is a G protein-coupled receptor which binds thyrotropin-releasing hormone.

The TRHR is found on the cell membrane of thyrotropes of the anterior pituitary. When the TRHR is activated it associates with a G_{αq/11} protein. The TRHR-G protein complex then activates phospholipase C, which causes the formation of inositol triphosphate (IP3) and diacylglycerol (DAG). This leads to an increase in cytoplasmic calcium ion concentrations which stimulates the exocytosis of thyroid-stimulating hormone (TSH) into the blood.
