= LY-367,265 =

Chemical compound

Identifiers
- IUPAC name: 1-(2-(4-(6-fluoro-1H-indol-3-yl)-5,6-dihydropyridin-1(2H)-yl)ethyl)-1,4,5,6-tetrahydro-[1,2,5]thiadiazolo[4,3,2-ij]quinoline 2,2-dioxide
- CAS Number: 210751-39-6
- PubChem CID: 4605800
- ChemSpider: 3797242
- UNII: SS58UXZ8ZU
- ChEBI: CHEBI:183634
- CompTox Dashboard (EPA): DTXSID801017165

Chemical and physical data
- Formula: C_{24}H_{25}FN_{4}O_{2}S
- Molar mass: 452.55 g·mol^{−1}
- 3D model (JSmol): Interactive image
- SMILES: FC1=CC=C2C(NC=C2C3=CCN(CCN(S4(=O)=O)C5=C6C(CCCN46)=CC=C5)CC3)=C1
- InChI: InChI=1S/C24H25FN4O2S/c25-19-6-7-20-21(16-26-22(20)15-19)17-8-11-27(12-9-17)13-14-28-23-5-1-3-18-4-2-10-29(24(18)23)32(28,30)31/h1,3,5-8,15-16,26H,2,4,9-14H2; Key:BJIPVHLRWSDKOS-UHFFFAOYSA-N

LY-367,265 is a drug of the tetrahydropyridinylindole group developed by Eli Lilly, which acts as both a potent and selective antagonist at the serotonin 5-HT_{2A} receptor, and also a selective serotonin reuptake inhibitor (SSRI). It has antidepressant effects in animal studies, reduces glutamate signalling in the brain and increases the analgesic effects of morphine.

== See also ==
- Tetrahydropyridinylindole
- Substituted tryptamine § Related compounds
