= GRIK4 =

Protein-coding gene in humans

Identifiers
- Aliases: GRIK4, EAA1, GRIK, GluK4, KA1, glutamate ionotropic receptor kainate type subunit 4, GluK4-2
- External IDs: OMIM: 600282; MGI: 95817; GeneCards: GRIK4

Gene location (Human)
Chr.	Chromosome 11 (human)
Band	11q23.3	Start	120,511,746 bp
Band	11q23.3	End	120,988,906 bp

Gene location (Mouse)
Chr.	Chromosome 9 (mouse)
Band	9 A5.1|9 23.8 cM	Start	42,429,431 bp
Band	9 A5.1|9 23.8 cM	End	42,855,789 bp
RNA expression pattern
Bgee	Human / Mouse (ortholog); Top expressed in: secondary oocyte; testicle; prefrontal cortex; anterior cingulate cortex; putamen; caudate nucleus; C1 segment; gonad; granulocyte; right frontal lobe / Top expressed in: dentate gyrus of hippocampal formation granule cell; hippocampus proper; hypothalamus; primary visual cortex; ganglion cell layer; superior frontal gyrus; cerebellum; striatum of neuraxis; cerebellar cortex; mesencephalon; More reference expression data
BioGPS	n/a
Gene ontology
Molecular function	kainate selective glutamate receptor activity; ion channel activity; extracellularly glutamate-gated ion channel activity; ionotropic glutamate receptor activity; ligand-gated ion channel activity; signaling receptor activity; glutamate receptor activity; transmitter-gated ion channel activity involved in regulation of postsynaptic membrane potential
Cellular component	integral component of membrane; cell junction; plasma membrane; postsynaptic membrane; integral component of plasma membrane; synapse; kainate selective glutamate receptor complex; presynaptic membrane; membrane; hippocampal mossy fiber to CA3 synapse; integral component of postsynaptic membrane; integral component of presynaptic membrane
Biological process	glutamate receptor signaling pathway; ion transmembrane transport; ion transport; chemical synaptic transmission; ionotropic glutamate receptor signaling pathway; excitatory postsynaptic potential; synaptic transmission, glutamatergic; modulation of chemical synaptic transmission; regulation of postsynaptic membrane potential
Sources:Amigo / QuickGO
Orthologs
Databases	NCBI: entry; OMA: entry
Species	Human	Mouse
Entrez	2900	110637
Ensembl	ENSG00000149403	ENSMUSG00000032017
UniProt	Q16099	Q8BMF5
RefSeq (mRNA)	NM_001282470; NM_001282473; NM_014619	NM_175481
RefSeq (protein)	NP_001269399; NP_001269402; NP_055434	NP_780690
Location (UCSC)	Chr 11: 120.51 – 120.99 Mb	Chr 9: 42.43 – 42.86 Mb
PubMed search
- Wikidata
View/Edit Human	View/Edit Mouse

GRIK4 3 prime UTR element
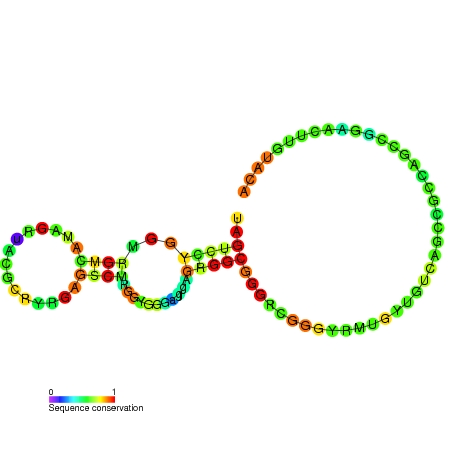
- Secondary structure identified in the 3' UTR of the GRIK4 transcript

Identifiers
- Symbol: GRIK4_3p_UTR
- Rfam: RF01383

Other data
- RNA type: Gene;
- Domain: Eukaryota;
- SO: SO:0001263
- PDB structures: PDBe

GRIK4 (glutamate receptor, ionotropic, kainate 4) is a kainate receptor subtype belonging to the family of ligand-gated ion channels which is encoded by the GRIK4 gene.

== Function ==
This gene encodes a protein that belongs to the glutamate-gated ionic channel family. Glutamate functions as the major excitatory neurotransmitter in the central nervous system through activation of ligand-gated ion channels and G protein-coupled membrane receptors. The protein encoded by this gene forms functional heteromeric kainate-preferring ionic channels with the subunits encoded by related gene family members.

== Clinical significance ==
A single nucleotide polymorphism (rs1954787) in the GRIK4 gene has shown a treatment-response-association with antidepressant treatment.

Variation in GRIK4 have been associated with both increased and decreased risk of bipolar disorder. A possible mechanism for this observation is that the sequence variation influences secondary structures in the 3' UTR.

Interfering with GRIK4/KA1 function with a specific anti-KA1 antibody protects against kainate-induced neuronal cell death.

A test of that gene can be made in order to know if a depressed patient will respond to the SSRI citalopram.

== Evolutionary significance ==
The GRIK4 gene displayed significantly higher rates of evolution in primates than in rodents and especially in the lineage leading from primates to humans. Furthermore, the GRIK4 gene is implicated in the development of the nervous system. Hence evolution of the GRIK4 gene is thought to have played a role in the dramatic increases in size and complexity of the brain that occurred during evolutionary history leading to humans.
