= Oleamide =

Chemical compound

Names
- Preferred IUPAC name (9Z)-Octadec-9-enamide
- Other names oleoyl-amide Oleylamide; 9-Octadecenamide (Z)-9-Octadecenamide; 9,10-Octadecenoamide; Oleic acid amide Cis-9,10-octadecenoamide

Identifiers
CAS Number	301-02-0
3D model (JSmol)	Interactive image
ChEBI	CHEBI:116314
ChEMBL	ChEMBL15927
ChemSpider	4446508
ECHA InfoCard	100.005.550
EC Number	206-103-9
IUPHAR/BPS	284
PubChem CID	5283387
UNII	7L25QK8BWO
CompTox Dashboard (EPA)	DTXSID6027137
- InChI: InChI=1S/C18H35NO/c1-2-3-4-5-6-7-8-9-10-11-12-13-14-15-16-17-18(19)20/h9-10H,2-8,11-17H2,1H3,(H2,19,20)/b10-9- Key: FATBGEAMYMYZAF-KTKRTIGZSA-N; InChI=1/C18H35NO/c1-2-3-4-5-6-7-8-9-10-11-12-13-14-15-16-17-18(19)20/h9-10H,2-8,11-17H2,1H3,(H2,19,20)/b10-9- Key: FATBGEAMYMYZAF-KTKRTIGZBR
- SMILES: O=C(N)CCCCCCC\C=C/CCCCCCCC

Properties
Chemical formula	C_{18}H_{35}NO
Molar mass	281.484 g·mol^{−1}
Appearance	Creamy solid
Density	0.879 g/cm^{3}
Melting point	70 °C (158 °F; 343 K)
Boiling point	> 200 °C (392 °F; 473 K)
Solubility in water	Insoluble

Hazards
NFPA 704 (fire diamond)	1 0 0
Flash point	> 200 °C (392 °F; 473 K)
- Except where otherwise noted, data are given for materials in their standard state (at 25 °C [77 °F], 100 kPa). Infobox references

Oleamide is an organic compound with the formula CH_{3}(CH_{2})_{7}CH=CH(CH_{2})_{7}CONH_{2}. It is the amide derived from the fatty acid oleic acid. It is a colorless waxy solid and occurs in nature. Sometimes labeled as a fatty acid primary amide (FAPA), it is biosynthesized from N-oleoylglycine.

== Biochemical and medical aspects ==
In terms of natural occurrence, oleamide was first detected in human plasma. It was later shown to accumulate in the cerebrospinal fluid during sleep deprivation and induces sleep in animals.

It has been considered as a treatment for mood and sleep disorders, as well as cannabinoid-regulated depression.

In terms of its sleep inducing effects, it is speculated that oleamide interacts with multiple neurotransmitter systems. Some in-vitro studies show that cis-oleamide is an agonist for the cannabinoid receptor CB-1 with an affinity around 8 micromolar. However, given oleamide's relatively low affinity for CB-1 and uncertainty about the concentration and biological role of oleamide in-vivo, it has been argued that it is premature to classify oleamide as an endocannabinoid. At larger doses oleamide can lower the body temperature of mice by about 2 degrees, with the effect lasting about two hours. The mechanism for this remains unknown.

Oleamide has been found to enhance PPARα-dependent increase in doublecortin, a marker of neurogenesis in the hippocampus

Oleamide is rapidly metabolized by fatty acid amide hydrolase (FAAH), the same enzyme that metabolizes anandamide. It has been postulated that some effects of oleamide are caused by increased concentrations of anandamide brought about through the inhibition of FAAH.

It has been claimed that oleamide increases the activity of choline acetyltransferase, an enzyme that is critical in the production of acetylcholine.

Oleamide and analogues have been found to act as positive allosteric modulators of the serotonin 5-HT_{2A}, 5-HT_{2C}, and 5-HT_{1A} receptors and as negative allosteric modulators of the serotonin 5-HT_{7} receptor. Synthetic derivatives of oleamide acting as selective dual serotonin 5-HT_{2A} and 5-HT_{2C} receptor positive allosteric modulators, such as JPC0323, have been developed.

== Other occurrences ==
Oleamide has been found in Ziziphus jujuba, also known as Jujube fruit.

Synthetic oleamide has a variety of industrial uses, including as a lubricant.

Oleamide was found to be leaching out of polypropylene plastics in laboratory experiments, affecting experimental results. Since polypropylene is used in a wide number of food containers such as those for yogurt, the problem is being studied.

Oleamide is "one of the most frequent non-cannabinoid ingredients associated with Spice products." Analysis of 44 products synthetic cannabinoid revealed oleamide in 7 of the products tested.

== See also ==
- Anandamide
- Fatty acid amide hydrolase
- Virodhamine
