= Multiple Sclerosis Discovery Forum =

Multiple Sclerosis Discovery Forum (MSDF) is a non-profit online resource created to speed progress toward a cure for multiple sclerosis (MS) and other demyelinating diseases by enabling faster sharing of information and free discussion among MS researchers in academia, industry, and the clinic.

Launched in April 2012, MSDF deploys science journalism as a primary tool in fostering communication and collaboration among MS researchers from all corners of the scientific enterprise. The site combines news and features with technical resources, such as a weekly editor-curated index of MS-related papers from PubMed and a database with the latest scientific and regulatory information about drugs being marketed or in the pipeline for treatment of MS. Other resources include interactive data visualizations, meetings and events, and discussion forums.

MSDF is modeled after online scientific community Alzheimer Research Forum (AlzForum). Since 1996, AlzForum has become a location for information and interaction for investigators working on age-related neurodegeneration. More recently, similar independent neutral Web-based neurology disease forums have followed, including Schizophrenia Research Forum and Pain Research Forum.

As with its sister forums, all content on MSDF is provided free of charge to the research community, and editorial independence from sponsors and donors is strictly maintained. MSDF articles have unique digital object identifiers (DOI) to provide stable linking over time and to facilitate discussion and altmetrics tracking of scientific articles in social media forums, s. MSDF articles are indexed by Google News.

MSDF covers the plausible but unproven questions of whether the dozen new anti-inflammatory therapies can be deployed more effectively against disease progression, as well as the upsurge in research to understand the pathological mechanisms and treatments for progressive MS. Related demyelinating conditions include neuromyelitis optica (NMO), transverse myelitis, acute disseminated encephalomyelitis, and optic neuritis. Their misdiagnosis as MS can lead to inappropriate and even harmful therapeutic choices, such as was discovered with NMO, now clearly understand to be a different disease.

MSDF is a joint activity of Accelerated Cure Project for Multiple Sclerosis (ACP) and the MassGeneral Institute for Neurodegenerative Disease (MIND).
