= Functional element SNPs database =

FESD

Content
- Description: Functional Element SNPs Database in humans.
- Organisms: Homo sapiens

Contact
- Authors: Hyo Jin Kang
- Primary citation: Kang & al. (2005)

Access
- Website: http://combio.kribb.re.kr/ksnp/resd/

The Functional Element SNPs Database (FESD) is a biological database of single nucleotide polymorphisms in molecular biology. The database is a tool designed to organize functional elements into categories in human gene regions and to output their sequences needed for genotyping experiments as well as provide a set of SNPs that lie within each region. The database defines functional elements into ten types: promoter regions, CpG islands, 5' untranslated regions (5'-UTRs), translation start sites, splice sites, coding exons, introns, translation stop sites, polyadenylation signals, and 3' UTRs. People may reference this database for haplotype information or obtain a flanking sequence for genotyping. This may help in finding mutations that contribute to common and polygenic diseases. Researchers can manually choose a group of SNPs of special interest for certain functional elements along with their corresponding sequences. The database combines information from sources such as HapMap, UCSC GoldenPath, dbSNP, OMIM, and TRANSFAC. Users can obtain information about tag SNPs and simulate LD blocks for each gene. FESD is still a developing database and is not widely known so was unable to find projects that used the database. Research was found using similar databases or databases that are combined in FESD's information pool.

== Uses ==
The database is a reference of all known SNPs in functional units that may affect a given phenotype in which some cases may be a disease. SNPs are selected based on disease, gene, or factor. The database has a link on the HapMap Project website. The database may have been used in one of the following research examples. The Korean HapMap Project website is quoted saying "We have developed a series of software programs for association studies as well as the comparison and analysis of Korean HapMap data with other populations, such as European, Chinese, Japanese, and African populations. The developed software includes HapMapSNPAnalyzer, SNPflank, HWE Test, FESD, D2GSNP, SNP@Domain, KMSD, KFOD, KFRG, and SNP@WEB." It is unknown how many species are included; however, there is an alphabetical list of all the genes included in case the gene name is known but not the disease it is associated with or factor it is located in. Some of the genes were from humans, mice, and some were from D. melanogaster. Information cannot be submitted to the database publicly. The database is updated regularly and the information is pooled from the sites listed on the page. There is also a user guide tab that displays what each process should look like.

== Research ==
- Susceptibility to Myocardial Infarction

The study involved the investigation of ITIH3 (inter alpha trypsin inhibitor heavy chain 3). Researchers used functional analysis, linkage disequilibrium mapping, SNP markers, and the HapMap database. FESD Version II may have been used since it has the information from HapMap as well as other databases. The researchers discovered that the gene was on chromosome 3. In vitro functional analyses showed that this SNP enhanced the transcriptional level of the ITIH3 gene. Furthermore, expression of the ITIH3 protein in the vascular smooth muscle cells and macrophages in the human atherosclerotic lesions was found, suggesting ITIH3 SNP to be a novel genetic risk factor of MI. The gene has been shown to be related to the proinflammatory process of immune response. ITIH3 makes a complex with the locally synthesized hyaluronan (HA) and interacts with inflammatory cells. The ITIH3-HA complex has been reported to be involved in inflammatory diseases, including rheumatoid arthritis and inflammatory bowel diseases. The most statistically-significant SNP did not substitute an amino acid of ITIH3 protein. The researchers hypothesized that this synonymous SNP affected the transcriptional regulation, because several papers reported that some transcriptional factors bound to the exonic coding sequences of some genes and regulated their transcriptional level. There was expression of ITIH3 protein in the atherosclerotic lesion. ITIH3 could play a critical role in the pathogenesis of atherosclerosis and subsequent myocardial infarction.

- Hepatocellular Carcinoma

These researchers used SNP selecting web tools and could have used FESD Version II to select their SNPs. They hypothesized that the polymorphisms in circadian genes may be associated with prognosis of hepatocellular carcinoma. The circadian negative feedback regulation genes- CRY1, CRY2, PER1, PER2 and PER3 were identified based on a comprehensive literature review and the potentially functional SNPs were selected through web tools. Finally, a total of twelve potentially functional SNPs in five genes were selected, including CRY1: rs1056560, rs3809236; CRY2: rs6798, rs2292910; PER1: rs2585405, rs3027178; PER2: rs934945, rs2304669; PER3: rs2640908, rs172933, rs2859390, rs228669. When the dominant genetic model was tested, their data showed that only SNP rs2640908 in PER3 gene was significantly associated with overall survival of hepatocellular carcinoma patients. Patients carrying at least one variant allele of rs2640908 had a significantly decreased risk of death when compared with those carrying homozygous wild-type alleles.

- Rheumatoid Arthritis

A polymorphism interaction analysis (PIA) algorithm was used to obtain cooperating single nucleotide polymorphisms (SNPs) that contribute to RA disease. The acquired SNP pairs were used to construct a SNP-SNP network. Sub-networks defined by hub SNPs were then extracted and turned into gene modules by mapping SNPs to genes using dbSNP database. The FESD Version II would also be a good choice in database because it also covers the dbSNP database. They ran the Haseman Elston test, then a random forest algorithm. The shared SNPs detected were then run through a polymorphism interaction analysis (PIA) algorithm. They performed gene ontology analysis of the 5 modules that were created. It was suggested that Ets-1 may be an important transcription factor in the cytokine-mediated inflammatory pathway and destructive cascade characteristic of RA. The ATP-binding cassette (ABC) transporter, ABCA1, was induced during differentiation of human monocytes into macrophages, and there was a dual regulatory function for ABCA1 in macrophage lipid metabolism and inflammation. Extracellular signals are transduced intracellularly via multiple pathways, resulting in alterations in the transcription and translation of specific proteins. Some of these signaling pathways result in the production of proteins, including cytokines and matrix metalloproteinases, which are implicated in the pathogenesis of RA. The zinc-finger protein 238 (ZNF238) is attached to zinc-finger proteins that can regulate the human immunodeficiency virus type 1. Hub gene CD160 is a potential RA association gene. The CD160 receptor represents a unique triggering surface molecule that is expressed by cytotoxic NK cells, it participates in the inflammatory response and determines the type of subsequent specific immunity.
