= AB0124 =

Clinical data
- Other names: AB-0124; ABO124; ABO-124
- Drug class: Serotonin 5-HT_{2A} receptor positive allosteric modulator

Identifiers
- IUPAC name: N-[2-(dimethylamino)ethyl]-4-(2-phenylethyl)piperidine-2-carboxamide
- PubChem CID: 167475110

Chemical and physical data
- Formula: C_{18}H_{29}N_{3}O
- Molar mass: 303.450 g·mol^{−1}
- 3D model (JSmol): Interactive image
- SMILES: CN(C)CCNC(=O)C1CC(CCN1)CCC2=CC=CC=C2
- InChI: InChI=1S/C18H29N3O/c1-21(2)13-12-20-18(22)17-14-16(10-11-19-17)9-8-15-6-4-3-5-7-15/h3-7,16-17,19H,8-14H2,1-2H3,(H,20,22); Key:YAFSEZSVGMQXTE-UHFFFAOYSA-N

AB0124 is a serotonin 5-HT_{2A} receptor positive allosteric modulator. It is highly selective for potentiation of the serotonin 5-HT_{2A} receptor, with no potentiation of the serotonin 5-HT_{2B} and 5-HT_{2C} receptors. In addition, it showed no orthosteric agonistic activity at any of the serotonin 5-HT_{2} receptors. AB0124 has been studied in combination with the serotonin 5-HT_{2} receptor agonist (R)-DOI in animal models of cocaine use disorder. The chemical synthesis of AB0124 has been described. The drug was patented in 2022 and was first described in the scientific literature by 2024.

== See also ==
- 5-HT2A receptor § Positive allosteric modulators
- JPC0323, CTW0404, and glaucine
