= GNA11 =

Protein-coding gene in the species Homo sapiens

Identifiers
- Aliases: GNA11, FBH, FBH2, FHH2, GNA-11, HHC2, HYPOC2, G protein subunit alpha 11, HG1K
- External IDs: OMIM: 139313; MGI: 95766; GeneCards: GNA11

Gene location (Human)
| Chr. | Chromosome 19 (human) |
| Band | 19p13.3 | Start | 3,094,362 bp |
| Band | 19p13.3 | End | 3,123,999 bp |

Gene location (Mouse)
| Chr. | Chromosome 10 (mouse) |
| Band | 10 C1|10 39.72 cM | Start | 81,364,558 bp |
| Band | 10 C1|10 39.72 cM | End | 81,381,024 bp |
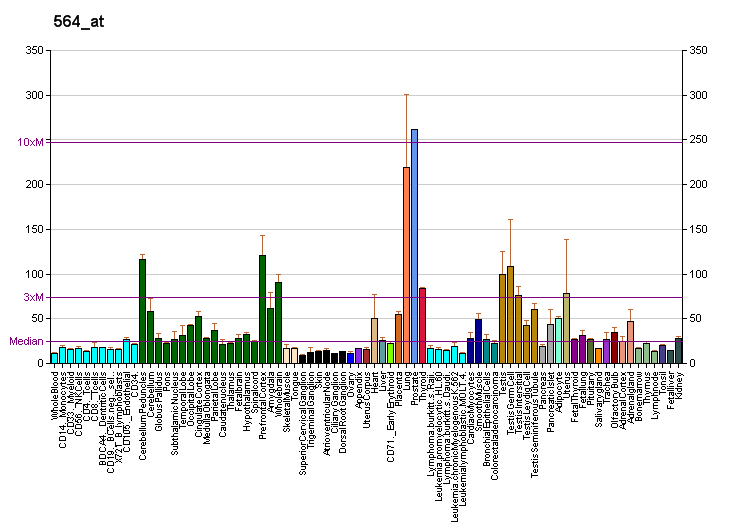

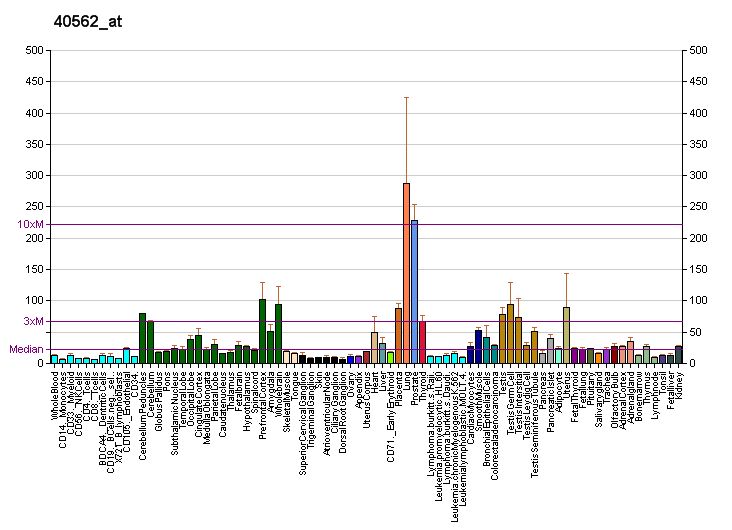

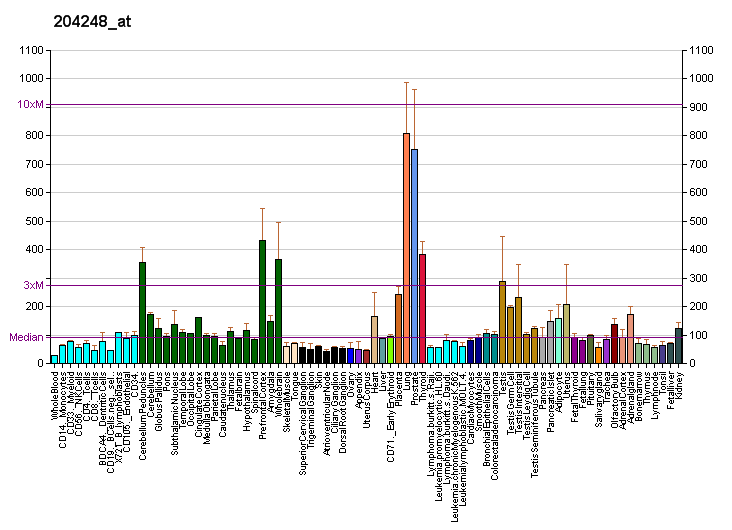
RNA expression pattern
| Bgee | Human / Mouse (ortholog); Top expressed in: mucosa of ileum; jejunal mucosa; pancreatic ductal cell; duodenum; mucosa of transverse colon; secondary oocyte; cerebellar vermis; parotid gland; right hemisphere of cerebellum; stromal cell of endometrium / Top expressed in: crypt of lieberkuhn of small intestine; duodenum; jejunum; ileum; intestinal villus; migratory enteric neural crest cell; epithelium of small intestine; left colon; Ileal epithelium; Paneth cell; More reference expression data |
| BioGPS | More reference expression data |
Gene ontology
| Molecular function | nucleotide binding; type 2A serotonin receptor binding; GTP binding; metal ion binding; guanyl nucleotide binding; G protein-coupled receptor binding; GTPase activity; signal transducer activity; G-protein beta/gamma-subunit complex binding; protein binding |
| Cellular component | cytoplasm; membrane; plasma membrane; photoreceptor outer segment; lysosomal membrane; extracellular exosome; heterotrimeric G-protein complex |
| Biological process | G protein-coupled acetylcholine receptor signaling pathway; skeletal system development; regulation of melanocyte differentiation; entrainment of circadian clock; platelet activation; development of the heart; cellular response to pH; phospholipase C-activating dopamine receptor signaling pathway; phototransduction of visible light; developmental pigmentation; action potential; signal transduction; adenylate cyclase-modulating G protein-coupled receptor signaling pathway; G protein-coupled receptor signaling pathway |
Sources:Amigo / QuickGO
Orthologs
| Databases | NCBI: entry; OMA: entry |
| Species | Human | Mouse |
| Entrez | 2767 | 14672 |
| Ensembl | ENSG00000088256 | ENSMUSG00000034781 |
| UniProt | P29992 | P21278 |
| RefSeq (mRNA) | NM_002067 | NM_010301 |
| RefSeq (protein) | NP_002058 | NP_034431 |
| Location (UCSC) | Chr 19: 3.09 – 3.12 Mb | Chr 10: 81.36 – 81.38 Mb |
| PubMed search |
- Wikidata
| View/Edit Human | View/Edit Mouse |

Guanine nucleotide-binding protein subunit alpha-11 is a protein that in humans is encoded by the GNA11 gene. Together with GNAQ (its paralogue), it functions as a Gq alpha subunit.

== See also ==
- Gq alpha subunit
