= YM-254890 =

Chemical compound

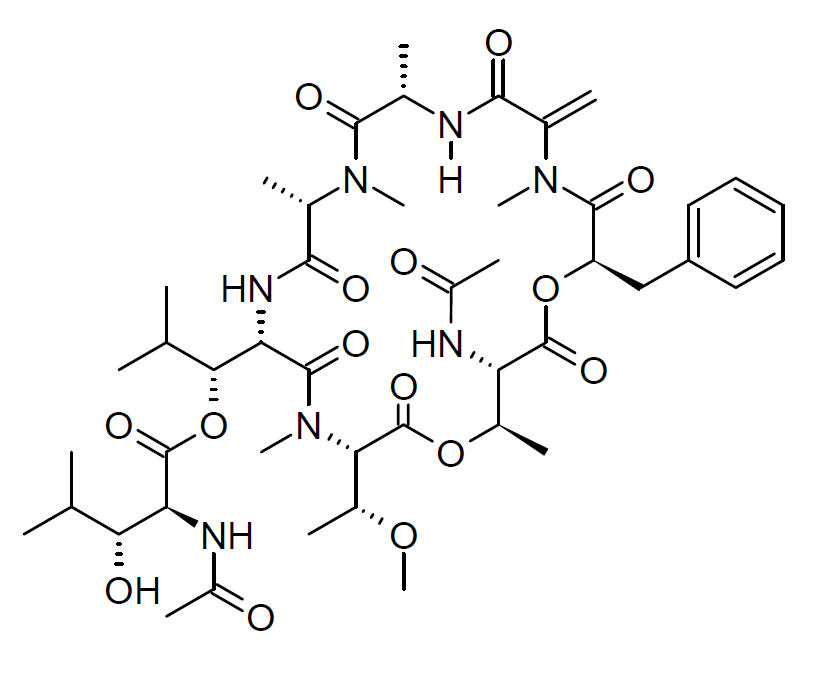

Identifiers
- IUPAC name: [(1R)-1-[(3S,6S,9S,12S,18R,21S,22R)-21-acetamido-18-benzyl-3-[(1R)-1-methoxyethyl]-4,9,10,12,16,22-hexamethyl-15-methylidene-2,5,8,11,14,17,20-heptaoxo-1,19-dioxa-4,7,10,13,16-pentazacyclodocos-6-yl]-2-methylpropyl] (2S,3R)-2-acetamido-3-hydroxy-4-methylpentanoate
- CAS Number: 568580-02-9
- PubChem CID: 9919454
- IUPHAR/BPS: 9335
- ChemSpider: 8095094
- ChEMBL: ChEMBL4288881

Chemical and physical data
- Formula: C_{46}H_{69}N_{7}O_{15}
- Molar mass: 960.092 g·mol^{−1}
- 3D model (JSmol): Interactive image
- SMILES: C[C@@H]1[C@@H](C(=O)O[C@@H](C(=O)N(C(=C)C(=O)N[C@H](C(=O)N([C@H](C(=O)N[C@H](C(=O)N([C@H](C(=O)O1)[C@@H](C)OC)C)[C@@H](C(C)C)OC(=O)[C@H]([C@@H](C(C)C)O)NC(=O)C)C)C)C)C)CC2=CC=CC=C2)NC(=O)C
- InChI: InChI=1S/C46H69N7O15/c1-22(2)37(56)34(49-30(11)55)45(63)68-38(23(3)4)35-43(61)53(14)36(28(9)65-15)46(64)66-27(8)33(48-29(10)54)44(62)67-32(21-31-19-17-16-18-20-31)42(60)52(13)25(6)39(57)47-24(5)41(59)51(12)26(7)40(58)50-35/h16-20,22-24,26-28,32-38,56H,6,21H2,1-5,7-15H3,(H,47,57)(H,48,54)(H,49,55)(H,50,58)/t24-,26-,27+,28+,32+,33-,34-,35-,36-,37+,38+/m0/s1; Key:QVYLWCAYZGFGNF-WBWCVGBTSA-N

YM-254890 is a macrolide antibiotic derived from Chromobacterium species. It is used as a pharmacological research compound which acts as a selective inhibitor of G_{q} mediated signalling. However the claimed selectivity for G_{q} has been disputed.
