= GNA15 =

Protein-coding gene in the species Homo sapiens

Identifiers
- Aliases: GNA15, GNA16, G protein subunit alpha 15, HG1L
- External IDs: OMIM: 139314; MGI: 95770; GeneCards: GNA15

Gene location (Human)
| Chr. | Chromosome 19 (human) |
| Band | 19p13.3 | Start | 3,136,033 bp |
| Band | 19p13.3 | End | 3,163,749 bp |

Gene location (Mouse)
| Chr. | Chromosome 10 (mouse) |
| Band | 10 C1|10 39.72 cM | Start | 81,338,140 bp |
| Band | 10 C1|10 39.72 cM | End | 81,360,059 bp |
RNA expression pattern
| Bgee | Human / Mouse (ortholog); Top expressed in: palpebral conjunctiva; gingival epithelium; monocyte; oral cavity; skin of abdomen; buccal mucosa cell; amniotic fluid; skin of leg; olfactory zone of nasal mucosa; periodontal fiber / Top expressed in: granulocyte; lip; esophagus; embryo; transitional epithelium of urinary bladder; embryo; morula; blastocyst; zone of skin; stroma of bone marrow; More reference expression data |
| BioGPS | n/a |
Gene ontology
| Molecular function | guanyl nucleotide binding; nucleotide binding; GTP binding; metal ion binding; GTPase activity; G-protein beta/gamma-subunit complex binding; G protein-coupled receptor binding; signal transducer activity |
| Cellular component | plasma membrane; heterotrimeric G-protein complex |
| Biological process | platelet activation; phospholipase C-activating G protein-coupled receptor signaling pathway; phospholipase C-activating G protein-coupled acetylcholine receptor signaling pathway; phospholipase C-activating dopamine receptor signaling pathway; activation of phospholipase C activity; signal transduction; adenylate cyclase-modulating G protein-coupled receptor signaling pathway; G protein-coupled receptor signaling pathway; positive regulation of cytosolic calcium ion concentration involved in phospholipase C-activating G protein-coupled signaling pathway |
Sources:Amigo / QuickGO
Orthologs
| Databases | NCBI: entry; OMA: entry |
| Species | Human | Mouse |
| Entrez | 2769 | 14676 |
| Ensembl | ENSG00000060558 | ENSMUSG00000034792 |
| UniProt | P30679 | P30678 |
| RefSeq (mRNA) | NM_002068 | NM_010304 |
| RefSeq (protein) | NP_002059 | NP_034434 |
| Location (UCSC) | Chr 19: 3.14 – 3.16 Mb | Chr 10: 81.34 – 81.36 Mb |
| PubMed search |
- Wikidata
| View/Edit Human | View/Edit Mouse |

Guanine nucleotide-binding protein subunit alpha-15 is a protein that in humans is encoded by the GNA15 gene. G_{15}α is a member of the Gq alpha subunit family, and functions as a constituent of a heterotrimeric G protein in cell signal transduction. It was also previously known as G_{16}α.

== See also ==
- Gq alpha subunit
- Heterotrimeric G protein
