= CTW0404 =

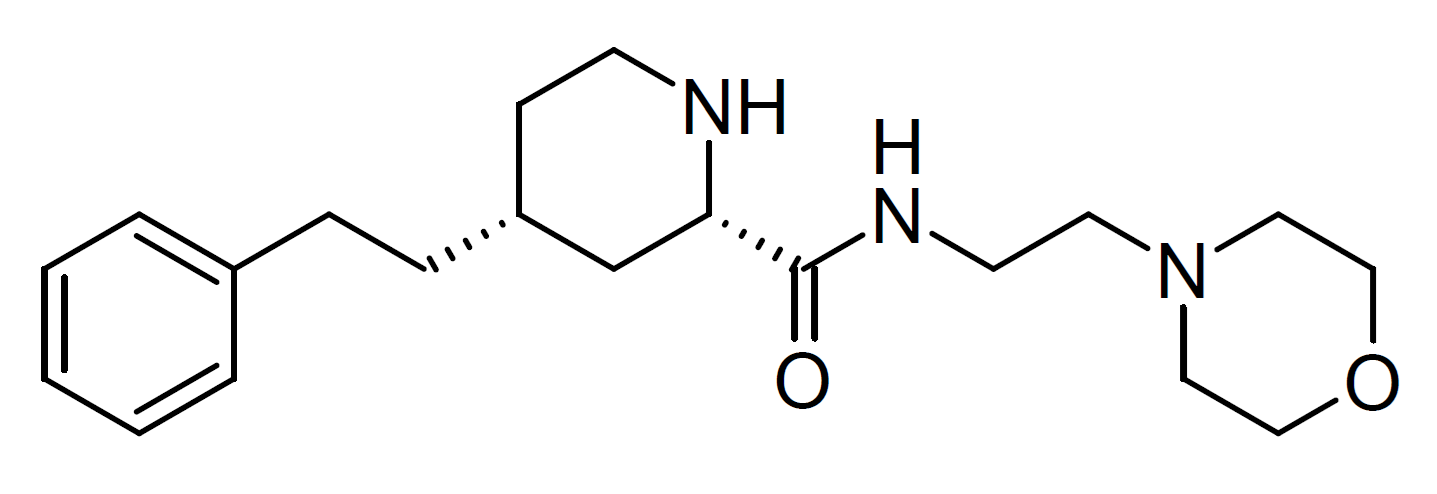

Identifiers
- IUPAC name: (2S,4R)-N-(2-morpholin-4-ylethyl)-4-(2-phenylethyl)piperidine-2-carboxamide
- PubChem CID: 156012687
- ChemSpider: 129472747
- ChEMBL: ChEMBL4637675

Chemical and physical data
- Formula: C_{20}H_{31}N_{3}O_{2}
- Molar mass: 345.487 g·mol^{−1}
- 3D model (JSmol): Interactive image
- SMILES: C1CN[C@@H](C[C@@H]1CCC2=CC=CC=C2)C(=O)NCCN3CCOCC3
- InChI: InChI=1S/C20H31N3O2/c24-20(22-10-11-23-12-14-25-15-13-23)19-16-18(8-9-21-19)7-6-17-4-2-1-3-5-17/h1-5,18-19,21H,6-16H2,(H,22,24)/t18-,19+/m1/s1; Key:YQSGRDPBXKGAPX-MOPGFXCFSA-N

CTW0404 is an experimental drug which is described as a positive allosteric modulator of the 5-HT_{2A} receptor, with neutral or negative modulation of the related 5-HT_{2B} and 5-HT_{2C} subtypes. It does not produce the head-twitch response in animal studies, and reduces the head-twitch response produced by DOI, suggesting that it may be a biased allosteric modulator selective for certain signalling pathways.

== See also ==
- 5-HT_{2A} receptor § Positive allosteric modulators
- CTW0415
- AB0124
