= Virodhamine =

Names
- Preferred IUPAC name 2-Aminoethyl (5Z,8Z,11Z,14Z)-icosa-5,8,11,14-tetraenoate
- Other names O-Arachidonoyl ethanolamine

Identifiers
CAS Number	287937-12-6
3D model (JSmol)	Interactive image
ChEMBL	ChEMBL187349
ChemSpider	4650158
ECHA InfoCard	100.158.921
IUPHAR/BPS	5554
PubChem CID	5712057
CompTox Dashboard (EPA)	DTXSID601018179
- InChI: InChI=1S/C22H37NO2/c1-2-3-4-5-6-7-8-9-10-11-12-13-14-15-16-17-18-19-22(24)25-21-20-23/h6-7,9-10,12-13,15-16H,2-5,8,11,14,17-21,23H2,1H3/b7-6-,10-9-,13-12-,16-15- Key: DLHLOYYQQGSXCC-DOFZRALJSA-N; InChI=1/C22H37NO2/c1-2-3-4-5-6-7-8-9-10-11-12-13-14-15-16-17-18-19-22(24)25-21-20-23/h6-7,9-10,12-13,15-16H,2-5,8,11,14,17-21,23H2,1H3/b7-6-,10-9-,13-12-,16-15- Key: DLHLOYYQQGSXCC-DOFZRALJBB
- SMILES: O=C(OCCN)CCC\C=C/C\C=C/C\C=C/C\C=C/CCCCC

Properties
Chemical formula	C_{22}H_{37}NO_{2}
Molar mass	347.53468
- Except where otherwise noted, data are given for materials in their standard state (at 25 °C [77 °F], 100 kPa). verify (what is ?) Infobox references

Virodhamine (O-arachidonoyl ethanolamine; O-AEA) is an endocannabinoid and a nonclassic eicosanoid, derived from arachidonic acid. O-Arachidonoyl ethanolamine is arachidonic acid and ethanolamine joined by an ester linkage, the opposite of the amide linkage found in anandamide. Based on this opposite orientation, the molecule was named virodhamine from the Sanskrit word virodha, which means opposition.

Virodhamine acts as an antagonist of the CB_{1} receptor and agonist of the CB_{2} receptor. Concentrations of virodhamine in the human hippocampus are similar to those of anandamide, but they are 2- to 9-fold higher in peripheral tissues that express CB_{2}. Virodhamine lowers body temperature in mice, demonstrating cannabinoid activity in vivo. Virodhamine has also been shown to activate platelets in whole blood and plasma, although this effect is due not to virodhamine itself, but its enzymatic cleavage to arachidonic acid, which then is converted to thromboxane A2.

== See also ==
- Anandamide
- Oleamide
