= GNAQ =

Protein-coding gene in the species Homo sapiens

Identifiers
- Aliases: GNAQ, CMC1, G-ALPHA-q, GAQ, SWS, G protein subunit alpha q
- External IDs: OMIM: 600998; MGI: 95776; GeneCards: GNAQ
Available structures
PDB	Ortholog search: PDBe RCSB
PDB	List of PDB id codes 2BCJ, 2RGN, 3AH8, 3OHM, 4EKC, 4EKD, 4GNK, 4QJ3, 4QJ4, 4QJ5

Gene location (Human)
Chr.	Chromosome 9 (human)
Band	9q21.2	Start	77,716,097 bp
Band	9q21.2	End	78,031,811 bp

Gene location (Mouse)
Chr.	Chromosome 19 (mouse)
Band	19 A|19 11.01 cM	Start	16,110,195 bp
Band	19 A|19 11.01 cM	End	16,364,827 bp
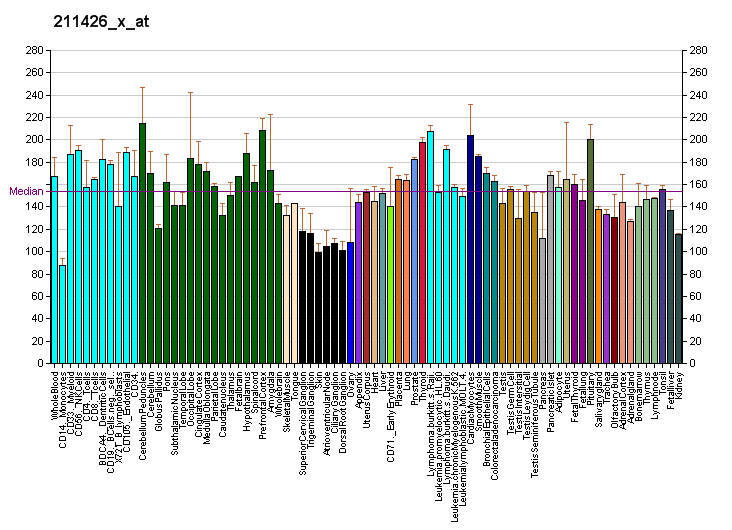

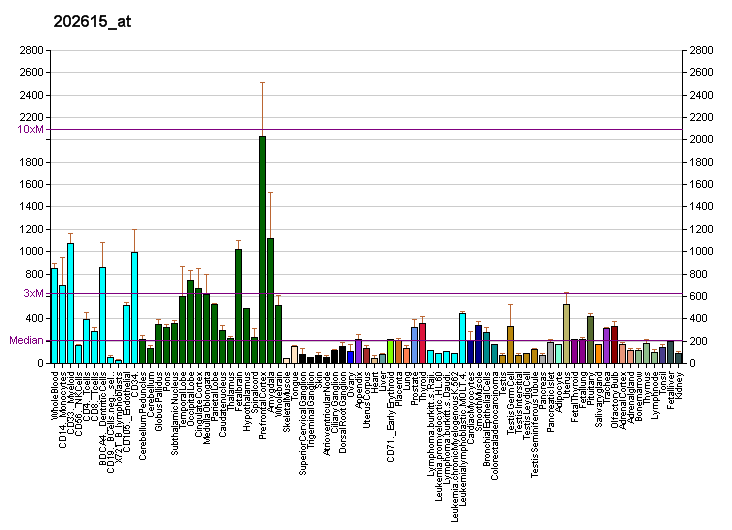
RNA expression pattern
Bgee	Human / Mouse (ortholog); Top expressed in: Region I of hippocampus proper; dorsal motor nucleus of vagus nerve; postcentral gyrus; inferior olivary nucleus; Brodmann area 46; pars reticulata; entorhinal cortex; orbitofrontal cortex; pars compacta; subthalamic nucleus / Top expressed in: ventromedial nucleus; arcuate nucleus; anterior amygdaloid area; mammillary body; Rostral migratory stream; lateral septal nucleus; paraventricular nucleus of hypothalamus; substantia nigra; ventral tegmental area; lateral hypothalamus; More reference expression data
BioGPS	More reference expression data
Gene ontology
Molecular function	nucleotide binding; type 2A serotonin receptor binding; GTPase activator activity; GTP binding; metal ion binding; protein binding; GTPase activity; guanyl nucleotide binding; G protein-coupled receptor binding; signal transducer activity; G-protein beta/gamma-subunit complex binding
Cellular component	cytoplasm; cell body; nuclear membrane; membrane; plasma membrane; photoreceptor outer segment; lysosomal membrane; dendrite; extracellular exosome; nucleus; heterotrimeric G-protein complex; intracellular anatomical structure
Biological process	G protein-coupled acetylcholine receptor signaling pathway; skeletal system development; negative regulation of protein kinase activity; neuron remodeling; embryonic digit morphogenesis; protein stabilization; blood coagulation; post-embryonic development; regulation of melanocyte differentiation; activation of phospholipase C activity; entrainment of circadian clock; platelet activation; forebrain neuron development; development of the heart; maternal behavior; phototransduction of visible light; developmental pigmentation; signal transduction; positive regulation of GTPase activity; glutamate receptor signaling pathway; action potential; adenylate cyclase-activating G protein-coupled receptor signaling pathway; phospholipase C-activating dopamine receptor signaling pathway; G protein-coupled receptor signaling pathway; adenylate cyclase-modulating G protein-coupled receptor signaling pathway; regulation of canonical Wnt signaling pathway
Sources:Amigo / QuickGO
Orthologs
Databases	NCBI: entry; OMA: entry
Species	Human	Mouse
Entrez	2776	14682
Ensembl	ENSG00000156052	ENSMUSG00000024639
UniProt	P50148	P21279
RefSeq (mRNA)	NM_002072	NM_008139
RefSeq (protein)	NP_002063; NP_002063.2	NP_032165
Location (UCSC)	Chr 9: 77.72 – 78.03 Mb	Chr 19: 16.11 – 16.36 Mb
PubMed search
- Wikidata
View/Edit Human	View/Edit Mouse

Guanine nucleotide-binding protein G(q) subunit alpha is a protein that in humans is encoded by the GNAQ gene. Together with GNA11 (its paralogue), it functions as a Gq alpha subunit.

== Function ==
Guanine nucleotide-binding proteins are a family of heterotrimeric proteins that couple cell surface, 7-transmembrane domain receptors to intracellular signaling pathways. Receptor activation catalyzes the exchange of GDP for GTP bound to the inactive G protein alpha subunit resulting in a conformational change and dissociation of the complex. The G protein alpha and beta-gamma subunits are capable of regulating various cellular effectors. Activation is terminated by a GTPase intrinsic to the G-alpha subunit. G-alpha-q is the alpha subunit of one of the heterotrimeric GTP-binding proteins that mediates stimulation of phospholipase C-beta (MIM 600230).[supplied by OMIM]

Mutations in this gene have been found associated to cases of Sturge–Weber syndrome and port-wine stains.

== Interactions ==
GNAQ has been shown to interact with:

- Beta adrenergic receptor kinase,
- Bruton's tyrosine kinase,
- RGS16
- RGS4
- RIC8A, and
- Sodium-hydrogen antiporter 3 regulator 1.

== See also ==
- List of genes mutated in pigmented cutaneous lesions
