= Alzheimer Research Forum =

Website

Alzheimer Research Forum (ARF), or Alzforum is a website which uses web technology to accelerate research into Alzheimer's disease.

== History ==
The website was founded in 1996 by June Kinoshita, funded by an anonymous philanthropic foundation, and launched at the International Conference on Alzheimer's Disease and Related Disorders in Osaka, Japan, The forum brings together a team of specialists in science writing and editing, data curation, information architecture, project management and technology.

Alzforum was established as an independent neutral Non-profit organization, without affiliation to any specific university or research institute. Its relations with the scientific community include an advisory board with leaders in the scientific community representing diverse points of view.

At first, the site took the form of ‘Papers of the Week’ listings, including abstracts of all relevant publications (initially manually produced in order to avoid copyright infringement), commentary, virtual audio seminars, and a list of seminal papers in Alzheimer's research. The Web's potential for interactivity was used for informal live chats and commentary on papers by registered users of the site. By the end of the first year there were 1200 users, adding as many as 100 new users a month in the first years of its existence.

== Operations ==
From 1997, the website also began to develop as a community repository, enabling researchers to deposit data sets. Currently it maintains several databases relating to gene mutations, gene association studies, epidemiological studies, antibodies, drug trials, protocols and antecedent biomarker studies. Of particular note are the AlzGene database of genetic studies of Alzheimer's disease, which has been cited more than 1,300 times in the scientific literature, and the AlzRisk database of epidemiologic studies. The forum acts as an integrator of these diverse sources, linking primary research articles to related news, papers, databases, and discussions .

From 2000 onwards, a data-driven dynamic system has been used to automatically search and download PubMed citations into a database, and provide tools for editors to post news and comments and crosslink them to related material. The development of semantic web tools is a current and ongoing development. These assist in the identification of hypotheses and related evidence in papers and discussions. SWAN (Semantic Web Applications in Neuromedicine) has resulted from a collaboration between the forum and Massachusetts General Hospital. Work on this continues with the Scientific Collaboration Framework.

The forum has become a point of reference for researchers into AD. As of June 2013 it has more than 8300 registered users. It is estimated that 30–50% of researchers from a wide range of institutions and countries studying Alzheimer's internationally are registered or active on the site.

The success of Alzforum has resulted in its online disease-specific scientific community framework being cloned in other areas of research into neurological disorders. Multiple Sclerosis Discovery Forum, Pain Research Forum, Schizophrenia Research Forum and PD Online (a site for research into Parkinson's disease, funded by the Michael J. Fox Foundation) are using the same approach as Alzforum.

== Bibliography ==
- Clark T, Kinoshita J. (2007) Alzforum and SWAN: the present and future of scientific web communities. Brief Bioinform; 8(3):163–71.
- Das S, McCaffrey PG, Talkington MW, Andrews NA, Corlosquet S, Ivinson AJ, Clark T. (2014) Pain Research Forum: application of scientific social media frameworks in neuroscience; doi:10.3389/fninf.2014.00021. eCollection 2014. Free full text.
- Kinoshita, June and Gabrielle Strobel. (2006) Alzheimer Research Forum: A Knowledge Base and e-Community for AD Research,” Alzheimer: 100 Years and Beyond. Eds. Jucker M, Beyreuther K, Haass C, Nitsch R, Christen Y. Springer-Verlag, Berlin Heidelberg.
- Kinoshita, J. & Clark, T., (2007) Alzforum: E-Science for Alzheimer Disease. From Methods in Molecular Biology: Neuroinformatics. Edited by C.J.Crasto. Totowa, NJ: Humana Press.
- Lars Bertram, Matthew B McQueen, Kristina Mullin, Deborah Blacker & Rudolph E Tanzi. Systematic meta-analyses of Alzheimer disease genetic association studies: the AlzGene database. Nature Genetics 39, 17 – 23 (2007) doi:10.1038/ng1934
- Jennifer Weuve, Matthew B. McQueen, Meredith Harrington, Jacqueline O'Brien, Shanshan Li, Melinda Power, Maile Ray, C Knep, June Kinoshita, Deborah Blacker. The AlzRisk database: Web-based catalogue and meta-analysis of findings from epidemiologic studies of non-genetic risk factors for Alzheimer's disease. Alzheimer's & Dementia: The Journal of the Alzheimer's Association. Volume 6, Issue 4, Supplement, Page S125, July 2010. Abstract.
