= Gq alpha subunit =

Family of heterotrimeric G protein alpha subunits

guanine nucleotide binding protein (G protein), q polypeptide

Identifiers
- Symbol: GNAQ
- NCBI gene: 2776
- HGNC: 4390
- OMIM: 600998
- RefSeq: NM_002072
- UniProt: P50148

Other data
- Locus: Chr. 9 q21
Search for
- Structures: Swiss-model
- Domains: InterPro

guanine nucleotide binding protein (G protein), alpha 11 (Gq class)

Identifiers
- Symbol: GNA11
- NCBI gene: 2767
- HGNC: 4379
- OMIM: 139313
- RefSeq: NM_002067
- UniProt: P29992

Other data
- Locus: Chr. 19 p13.3
Search for
- Structures: Swiss-model
- Domains: InterPro

guanine nucleotide binding protein (G protein), alpha 14

Identifiers
- Symbol: GNA14
- NCBI gene: 9630
- HGNC: 4382
- OMIM: 604397
- RefSeq: NM_004297
- UniProt: O95837

Other data
- Locus: Chr. 9 q21
Search for
- Structures: Swiss-model
- Domains: InterPro

guanine nucleotide binding protein (G protein), alpha 15 (Gq class)

Identifiers
- Symbol: GNA15
- NCBI gene: 2769
- HGNC: 4383
- OMIM: 139314
- RefSeq: NM_002068
- UniProt: P30679

Other data
- Locus: Chr. 19 p13.3
Search for
- Structures: Swiss-model
- Domains: InterPro

G_{q} protein alpha subunit is a family of heterotrimeric G protein alpha subunits. This family is also commonly called the G_{q/11} (G_{q}/G_{11}) family or G_{q/11/14/15} family to include closely related family members. G alpha subunits may be referred to as G_{q} alpha, G_{αq}, or G_{q}α. G_{q} proteins couple to G protein-coupled receptors to activate beta-type phospholipase C (PLC-β) enzymes. PLC-β in turn hydrolyzes phosphatidylinositol 4,5-bisphosphate (PIP_{2}) to diacyl glycerol (DAG) and inositol trisphosphate (IP_{3}). IP_{3} acts as a second messenger to release stored calcium into the cytoplasm, while DAG acts as a second messenger that activates protein kinase C (PKC).

== Family members ==
In humans, there are four distinct proteins in the G_{q} alpha subunit family:

- G_{αq} is encoded by the gene GNAQ.
- G_{α11} is encoded by the gene GNA11.
- G_{α14} is encoded by the gene GNA14.
- G_{α15} is encoded by the gene GNA15.

== Function ==
The general function of G_{q} is to activate intracellular signaling pathways in response to activation of cell surface G protein-coupled receptors (GPCRs). GPCRs function as part of a three-component system of receptor-transducer-effector. The transducer in this system is a heterotrimeric G protein, composed of three subunits: a Gα protein such as G_{αq}, and a complex of two tightly linked proteins called Gβ and Gγ in a Gβγ complex. When not stimulated by a receptor, Gα is bound to guanosine diphosphate (GDP) and to Gβγ to form the inactive G protein trimer. When the receptor binds an activating ligand outside the cell (such as a hormone or neurotransmitter), the activated receptor acts as a guanine nucleotide exchange factor to promote GDP release from and guanosine triphosphate (GTP) binding to Gα, which drives dissociation of GTP-bound Gα from Gβγ. Recent evidence suggests that Gβγ and Gαq-GTP could maintain partial interaction via the N-α-helix region of Gαq. GTP-bound Gα and Gβγ are then freed to activate their respective downstream signaling enzymes.

G_{q/11/14/15} proteins all activate beta-type phospholipase C (PLC-β) to signal through calcium and PKC signaling pathways. PLC-β then cleaves a specific plasma membrane phospholipid, phosphatidylinositol 4,5-bisphosphate (PIP_{2}) into diacyl glycerol (DAG) and inositol 1,4,5-trisphosphate (IP_{3}). DAG remains bound to the membrane, and IP_{3} is released as a soluble molecule into the cytoplasm. IP_{3} diffuses to bind to IP_{3} receptors, a specialized calcium channel in the endoplasmic reticulum (ER). These channels are specific to calcium and only allow the passage of calcium from the ER into the cytoplasm. Since cells actively sequester calcium in the ER to keep cytoplasmic levels low, this release causes the cytosolic concentration of calcium to increase, causing a cascade of intracellular changes and activity through calcium binding proteins and calcium-sensitive processes.

Further reading: Calcium function in vertebrates

DAG works together with released calcium to activate specific isoforms of PKC, which are activated to phosphorylate other molecules, leading to further altered cellular activity.

Further reading: function of protein kinase C

The Gαq / Gα11 (Q209L) mutation is associated with the development of uveal melanoma and its pharmacological inhibition (cyclic depsipeptide FR900359 inhibitor), decreases tumor growth in preclinical trials.

== Receptors ==
The following G protein-coupled receptors couple to G_{q} subunits:

- 5-HT_{2} serotonergic receptors
- Alpha-1 adrenergic receptor
- Vasopressin type 1 receptors: 1A and 1B
- Angiotensin II receptor type 1
- Calcitonin receptor
- Glutamate mGluR1 and mGluR5 receptors
- Gonadotropin-releasing hormone receptor
- Histamine H1 receptor
- M_{1}, M_{3}, and M_{5} muscarinic receptors
- Thyrotropin-releasing hormone receptor
- Trace amine-associated receptor 1

At least some Gq-coupled receptors (e.g., the muscarinic acetylcholine M_{3} receptor) can be found preassembled (pre-coupled) with G_{q}. The common polybasic domain in the C-tail of G_{q}-coupled receptors appears necessary for this receptor–G protein preassembly.

== Inhibitors ==
- The cyclic depsipeptides FR900359 and YM-254890 are strong, highly specific inhibitors of Gq and G11.

== See also ==
- Second messenger system
- G protein-coupled receptor
- Heterotrimeric G protein
- Phospholipase C
- Calcium signaling
- Protein kinase C
- Gs alpha subunit
- Gi alpha subunit
- G12/G13 alpha subunits
