= GNA14 =

Protein-coding gene in the species Homo sapiens

Identifiers
- Aliases: GNA14, G protein subunit alpha 14, HG1I
- External IDs: OMIM: 604397; MGI: 95769; GeneCards: GNA14

Gene location (Human)
Chr.	Chromosome 9 (human)
Band	9q21.2	Start	77,423,079 bp
Band	9q21.2	End	77,648,322 bp

Gene location (Mouse)
Chr.	Chromosome 19 (mouse)
Band	19 A|19 11.29 cM	Start	16,413,126 bp
Band	19 A|19 11.29 cM	End	16,588,184 bp
RNA expression pattern
Bgee	Human / Mouse (ortholog); Top expressed in: secondary oocyte; bronchial epithelial cell; testicle; C1 segment; smooth muscle tissue; left lobe of thyroid gland; tail of epididymis; olfactory zone of nasal mucosa; right lobe of thyroid gland; body of uterus / Top expressed in: lumbar spinal ganglion; vestibular membrane of cochlear duct; zygote; secondary oocyte; facial motor nucleus; primary oocyte; left colon; gastrula; right kidney; stria vascularis; More reference expression data
BioGPS	n/a
Gene ontology
Molecular function	guanyl nucleotide binding; nucleotide binding; GTP binding; protein binding; metal ion binding; G protein-coupled receptor binding; GTPase activity; signal transducer activity; G-protein beta/gamma-subunit complex binding
Cellular component	plasma membrane; extracellular exosome; heterotrimeric G-protein complex
Biological process	platelet activation; phospholipase C-activating dopamine receptor signaling pathway; signal transduction; adenylate cyclase-modulating G protein-coupled receptor signaling pathway; G protein-coupled receptor signaling pathway
Sources:Amigo / QuickGO
Orthologs
Databases	NCBI: entry; OMA: entry
Species	Human	Mouse
Entrez	9630	14675
Ensembl	ENSG00000156049	ENSMUSG00000024697
UniProt	O95837	P30677
RefSeq (mRNA)	NM_004297	NM_008137
RefSeq (protein)	NP_004288	NP_032163
Location (UCSC)	Chr 9: 77.42 – 77.65 Mb	Chr 19: 16.41 – 16.59 Mb
PubMed search
- Wikidata
View/Edit Human	View/Edit Mouse

Guanine nucleotide-binding protein subunit alpha-14 is a protein that in humans is encoded by the GNA14 gene. G_{14}α is a member of the Gq alpha subunit family, and functions as a constituent of a heterotrimeric G protein in cell signal transduction.

== See also ==
- Gq alpha subunit
- Heterotrimeric G protein
