= Schizophrenia Research Forum =

Mental health knowledge environment

- Website type: Knowledge environment
- Founded: 2005
- Founder: Hakon Heimer
- Website: schizophreniaforum.org

Schizophrenia Research Forum is a web knowledge environment dedicated to news, information resources, and discussion about research on schizophrenia. It hosts a number of resources such as What We Know About Schizophrenia, Animal Models, and Drugs in Trials. It also hosts the SzGene database, an unbiased field synopsis of genetic association studies performed in schizophrenia, though this database is no longer updated.

The Schizophrenia Forum was founded in 2005 by science editor Hakon Heimer as a project of the National Alliance for Research on Schizophrenia and Depression (now called the Brain & Behavior Research Foundation, with start-up funding from the National Institute of Mental Health and technical assistance from the Alzheimer Research Forum website. Heimer won the 2011 Media Award from the American College of Neuropsychopharmacology for developing the site.
