= DbSNP =

Genetics database

dbSNP

Content
- Description: Single Nucleotide Polymorphism Database
- Organisms: Homo sapiens

Contact
- Research center: National Center for Biotechnology Information
- Primary citation: PMID 21097890
- Release date: 1998

Access
- Data format: ASN.1, FASTA, XML
- Website: ncbi.nlm.nih.gov/snp/
- Download URL: ftp://ftp.ncbi.nih.gov/snp/
- Web service URL: EUtils; SOAP

The Single Nucleotide Polymorphism Database (dbSNP) is a free public archive for genetic variation within and across different species developed and hosted by the National Center for Biotechnology Information (NCBI) in collaboration with the National Human Genome Research Institute (NHGRI).

Although the name of the database implies a collection of only single nucleotide polymorphisms (SNPs), it in fact contains a range of molecular variation: SNPs, short deletion and insertion polymorphisms (indels), microsatellite markers or short tandem repeats (STRs), multinucleotide polymorphisms (MNPs), heterozygous sequences, and named variants. The dbSNP accepts apparently neutral polymorphisms, polymorphisms corresponding to known phenotypes, and regions of no variation. It was created in September 1998 to supplement GenBank, NCBI's collection of publicly available nucleic acid and protein sequences.

In 2017, NCBI stopped support for all non-human organisms in dbSNP. As of build 153 (released in August 2019), dbSNP had amassed nearly 2 billion submissions representing more than 675 million distinct variants for Homo sapiens.

== Purpose ==
dbSNP is an online resource implemented to aid biology researchers. Its goal is to act as a single database that contains all identified genetic variation, which can be used to investigate a wide variety of genetically based natural phenomena. Specifically, access to the molecular variation cataloged within dbSNP aids basic research such as physical mapping, population genetics, investigations into evolutionary relationships, as well as being able to quickly and easily quantify the amount of variation at a given site of interest. In addition, dbSNP guides applied research in pharmacogenomics and the association of genetic variation with phenotypic traits. According to the NCBI website, “The long-term investment in such novel and exciting research [dbSNP] promises not only to advance human biology but to revolutionise the practice of modern medicine.”

a) Various sources submit data, and each variation is assigned a unique submitted SNP number ID (ss#). b) dbSNP compiles identical ss# records into one reference SNP cluster (rs#) containing data from each ss#. c) Users can retrieve data for specific rs# records and analyze these variations. d) Data from dbSNP aids clinical and applied research. The ss# and rs# IDs in this figure are examples only. NCBI, National Center for Biotechnology Information; OMIM, Online Mendelian Inheritance in Man; GWAS, genome wide association study.

== Submission ==
=== 1. Source ===
Originally, dbSNP accepts submissions for any organism from a wide variety of sources including individual research laboratories, collaborative polymorphism discovery efforts, large scale genome sequencing centers, other SNP databases (e.g. the SNP consortium, HapMap, etc.), and private businesses. On September 1, 2017, dbSNP stopped accepting non-human variant data submissions and two months later, its interactive websites and related NCBI services stopped presenting non-human variant data. Now dbSNP only accepts and presents human variant data.

=== 2. Types of records ===
Every submitted variation receives a submitted SNP ID number (“ss#”). This accession number is a stable and unique identifier for that submission. Unique submitted SNP records also receive a reference SNP ID number (“rs#”; "refSNP cluster"). However, more than one record of a variation will likely be submitted to dbSNP, especially for clinically relevant variations. To accommodate this, dbSNP routinely assembles identical submitted SNP records into a single reference SNP record, which is also a unique and stable identifier (see below).

=== 3. How to submit ===
To submit variations to dbSNP, one must first acquire a submitter handle, which identifies the laboratory responsible for the submission. Next, the author is required to complete a submission file containing the relevant information and data. Submitted records must contain the ten essential pieces of information listed in the following table. Other information required for submissions includes contact information, publication information (title, journal, authors, year), molecule type (genomic DNA, cDNA, mitochondrial DNA, chloroplast DNA), and organism.

Element	Explanation
Sequence Context (Required)	An essential component of a submission to dbSNP is an unambiguous location for the variation being submitted. dbSNP now minimally requires that you submit variant location as an asserted position on RefSeq or INSDC sequences.
Alleles (Required)	Alleles define each variation class. dbSNP defines single nucleotide variants in its submission scheme as G, A, T, or C, and does not permit ambiguous IUPAC codes, such as N, in the allele definition of a variation.
Method (Required)	Each submitter defines the methods in their submission as either the techniques used to assay variation or the techniques used to estimate allele frequencies. dbSNP groups methods by method class to facilitate queries using general experimental technique as a query field. The submitter provides all other details of the techniques in a free-text description of the method.
Asserted Allele Origin (Required)	A submitter can provide a statement (assertion) with supporting experimental evidence that a variant has a particular allelic origin. Assertions for a single refSNP are summarized and given an attribute value of germline or unknown.
Population (Required)	Each submitter defines population samples either as the group used to initially identify variations or as the group used to identify population-specific measures of allele frequencies. These populations may be one and the same in some experimental designs.
Sample Size (Optional)	There are two sample-size fields in dbSNP. One field, SNPASSAY SAMPLE SIZE, reports the number of chromosomes in the sample used to initially ascertain or discover the variation. The other sample size field, SNPPOPUSE SAMPLE SIZE, reports the number of chromosomes used as the denominator in computing estimates of allele frequencies.
Population-specific Allele Frequencies (Optional)	Frequency data are submitted to dbSNP as allele counts or binned frequency intervals, depending on the precision of the experimental method used to make the measurement. dbSNP contains records of allele frequencies for specific population samples that are defined by each submitter and used in validating submitted variations.
Population-specific Genotype Frequencies (Optional)	Similar to alleles, genotypes have frequencies in populations that can be submitted to dbSNP, and are used in validating submitted variations.
Individual genotypes	dbSNP accepts individual genotypes from samples provided by donors that have consented to having their DNA sequence housed in a public database (e.g. HapMap or the 1000 Genomes project).
Validation Information (Optional)	Assays validated directly by the submitter through the VALIDATION section show the type of evidence used to confirm the variation.

== Release ==
New information obtained by dbSNP becomes available to the public periodically in a series of “builds” (i.e. revisions and releases of data). There is no schedule for releasing new builds; instead, builds are usually released when a new genome build becomes available, assuming that the genome has some cataloged variation associated with it. This occurs approximately every 3–4 months. Genome sequences may be improved over time so reference SNPs (“refSNP”) from previous builds, as well as new submitted SNPs, are re-mapped to the newly available genome sequence. Multiple submitted SNPs, if mapping to the same location, are clustered into one refSNP cluster and are assigned a reference SNP ID number. However, if two refSNP cluster records are found to map to the same location (i.e. are identical), dbSNP will also merge those records. In this case, the smaller refSNP number ID (i.e. the earliest record) would now represent both records, and the larger refSNP number IDs would become obsolete. These obsolete refSNP number IDs and are not used again for new records. When a merger of two refSNP records occurs, the change is tracked, and the former refSNP number IDs can still be used as a search query. This process of merging identical records reduces redundancy within dbSNP.

There are two exceptions to the above merging criteria. First, variation of different classes (e.g. a SNP and a DIP) are not merged. Secondly, clinically important refSNPs that have been cited in the literature are termed “precious”; a merger that would eliminate such a refSNP is never performed, since it could later cause confusion.

== Retrieval ==
=== 1. How to ===
The dbSNP can be searched using the Entrez SNP search tool. A variety of queries can be used for searching: an ss number ID, a refSNP number ID, a gene name, an experimental method, a population class, a population detail, a publication, a marker, an allele, a chromosome, a base position, a heterozygosity range, or a build number. In addition, many results can be retrieved simultaneously using batch queries. Searches return refSNP number IDs that match the query term and a summary of the available information for that refSNP cluster.

=== 2. Tools/Data ===
The information available for a refSNP cluster includes the basic information from each of the individual submissions (see “Submission”) as well as information available from combining the data from multiple submissions (e.g. heterozygosity, genotype frequencies). Many tools are available to examine a refSNP cluster in greater depth. Map view shows the position of the variation in the genome and other nearby variations. Another tool, gene view reports the location of the variation within a gene (if it is in a gene), the old and new codon, the amino acids encoded by both, and whether the change is synonymous or non-synonymous. Sequence viewer shows the position of the variant in relation to introns, exons, and other distant and close variants. 3D structure mapping, which shows 3D images of the encoded protein is also available.

The dbSNP is also linked to many other NCBI resources including the nucleotide, protein, gene, taxonomy and structure databases, as well as PubMed, UniSTS, PMC, OMIM, and UniGene.

=== 3. Validation status ===
The validation status list the categories of evidence that support a variant. These include: (1) multiple independent submissions; (2) frequency or genotype data; (3) submitter confirmation; (4) observation of all alleles in at least two chromosomes; (5) genotyped by HapMap; and (6) sequenced in the 1000 Genomes Project.

== Problems With Data Quality ==
The quality of the data found on dbSNP has been questioned by many research groups, which suspect high false positive rates due to genotyping and base-calling errors. These mistakes can easily be entered into dbSNP if the submitter uses (1) uncritical bioinformatic alignments of highly similar but distinct DNA sequences, and/or (2) PCRs with primers that cannot discriminate between similar but distinct DNA sequences. Mitchell et al. (2004) reviewed four studies and concluded that dbSNP has a false positive rate between 15 and 17% for SNPs, and also that the minor allele frequency is greater than 10% for approximately 80% of the SNPs that are not false positives. Similarly, Musemeci et al. (2010) states that as many as 8.32% of the biallelic coding SNPs in dbSNP are artifacts of highly similar DNA sequences (i.e. paralogous genes) and refer to these entries as single nucleotide differences (SNDs). The high error rates in dbSNP may not be surprising: of the 23.7 million refSNP entries for humans, only 14.5 million have been validated, leaving the remaining 9.2 million as candidate SNPs. However, according to Musemeci et al. (2010), even the validation code provided in the refSNP record is only partially useful: only HapMap validation reduced the number of SNDs (3% vs 8%), but only accepting this method removes more than half of the real SNPs in the dbSNP. These authors also note that one source of submissions from the Lee group are plagued with errors: 20% of these submissions are SNDs (vs. 8% for submissions). However, as the authors note, ignoring all of these submissions would remove many real SNPs.

Errors in the dbSNP can hamper candidate gene association studies and haplotype-based investigations. Errors may also increase false conclusions in association studies: increasing the number of SNPs that are tested by testing false SNPs requires more hypothesis tests. However, these false SNPs cannot actually be associated with traits, so the alpha level is decreased more than is necessary for a rigorous test if only the true SNPs were tested and the false negative rate will increase. Musemeci et al. (2010) suggested that authors of negative association studies inspect their previous studies for false SNPs (SNDs), which could be removed from analysis.

== How to cite data from dbSNP ==
Individual sequences can be referred to by their refSNP cluster ID numbers (e.g. rs206437). dbSNP should be referenced using the 2001 Sherry et al. paper: Sherry, S.T., Ward, M.H., Kholodov, M., Baker, J., Phan, L., Smigielski, E.M., Sirotkin, K. (2001). dbSNP: the NCBI database of genetic variation. Nucleic Acids Research, 29: 308–311.

== See also ==
- SNPedia
- HapMap
- NCBI
- NHGRI
