= SNPedia =

Wiki about DNA variations

Content
- Description: a wiki of human single-nucleotide polymorphisms and genotypes
- Data types captured: single-nucleotide polymorphisms, genotypes, genes, variation
- Organisms: Homo sapiens

Contact
- Primary citation: PMID 22140107

Access
- Website: www.snpedia.com
- Download URL: www.snpedia.com/index.php/Bulk
- Web service URL: bots.snpedia.com/api.php

Miscellaneous
- License: Creative Commons Attribution-Noncommercial-Share Alike 3.0 United States License
- Curation policy: wiki

SNPedia (pronounced "snipedia") is a wiki-based bioinformatics web site that serves as a database of single nucleotide polymorphisms (SNPs). Each article on a SNP provides a short description, links to scientific articles and personal genomics web sites, as well as microarray information about that SNP. Thus SNPedia may support the interpretation of results of personal genotyping from, e.g., 23andMe and similar companies.

SNPedia is a semantic wiki, powered by MediaWiki and the Semantic MediaWiki extension.

SNPedia was created, and is run by, geneticist Greg Lennon and programmer Mike Cariaso, who at the time of the site's founding were both located in Bethesda, Maryland.

As of 27 June 2019, the website has 537 medical conditions and 109,729 SNPs in its database. The number of SNPs in SNPedia has doubled roughly once every 14 months since August 2007.

On 7 September 2019, MyHeritage announced that they acquired both SNPedia and Promethease. All non-European raw genetic data files previously uploaded to Promethease, and not deleted by users by 1 Nov 2019, are to be copied to MyHeritage and the users will receive a free MyHeritage account with paid level of services, including Cousin Matching and Ethnicities.

== Promethease ==
An associated computer program called Promethease, also developed by the SNPedia team, allows users to compare personal genetics results against the SNPedia database, generating a report with information about a person's attributes, such as propensity to diseases, based on the presence of specific SNPs within their genome.

In May 2008 Cariaso, using Promethease, won an online contest sponsored by 23andMe to determine as much information as possible about an anonymous woman based only on her genome. Cariaso won in all three categories of "accuracy, creativity and cleverness". In 2009, the anonymous woman ("Lilly Mendel") was revealed to be 23andMe co-founder Linda Avey, allowing a direct comparison between her actual traits and those predicted by Promethease a year earlier.

== Reception ==
In a June 2008 article on personal genomics, a doctor from the Southern Illinois University School of Medicine said:

The availability of online tools such as SNPedia means we are now in the position where the patient often knows more about their risk implications than their doctor [...]

In January 2011, technology journalist Ronald Bailey posted the full result of his Promethease report online. Writing about his decision in Reason magazine, he stated:

We are fast approaching an era in which genetic information is no longer exclusive or medicalized. Instead, as screening costs plummet and our knowledge about genetics expands, virtually everyone will soon be able to have their genotypes at their fingertips. Knowing and sharing that information will enhance, not jeopardize, our sense of ourselves, change the way we consume medicine and plan for the future, and influence how we relate to each other.

Members of the medical community have criticised Promethease for technical complexity and a poorly defined "magnitude" scale that causes misconceptions, confusion and panic among its users.

== See also ==
- dbSNP
- Online Mendelian Inheritance in Man
- Full Genome Sequencing
- Predictive Medicine
