= IHCH-8134 =

Chemical compound

Clinical data
- Drug class: Serotonin 5-HT_{2A} receptor agonist

Identifiers
- IUPAC name: (6bR,10aS)-8-(3-(2-methoxyphenyl)propyl)-1,2,6b,7,8,9,10,10a-octahydro-[1,4]oxazino[2,3,4-hi]pyrido[4,3-b]indole
- PubChem CID: 172549469

Chemical and physical data
- Formula: C_{23}H_{28}N_{2}O_{2}
- Molar mass: 364.489 g·mol^{−1}
- 3D model (JSmol): Interactive image
- SMILES: [H][C@@]12[C@@](CCN(CCCC3=CC=CC=C3OC)C2)([H])N4CCOC5=C4C1=CC=C5
- InChI: InChI=1S/C23H28N2O2/c1-26-21-9-3-2-6-17(21)7-5-12-24-13-11-20-19(16-24)18-8-4-10-22-23(18)25(20)14-15-27-22/h2-4,6,8-10,19-20H,5,7,11-16H2,1H3/t19-,20-/m0/s1; Key:XIZOEKLHAJIDMD-PMACEKPBSA-N

IHCH-8134 is a serotonin 5-HT_{2A} receptor agonist of the oxazinopyridoindole family. It was derived by structural simplification of the serotonin 5-HT_{2A} receptor antagonist and atypical antipsychotic lumateperone. Another related compound is the pyridopyrroloquinoxaline IHCH-7079, which was found to be a non-hallucinogenic biased serotonin 5-HT_{2A} receptor agonist that was active in antidepressant assays but did not produce psychedelic-like responding in mice.

== See also ==
- Pyridopyrroloquinoxaline § Related compounds
- Non-hallucinogenic 5-HT_{2A} receptor agonist
- Efavirenz
- IHCH-7079
- IHCH-7086
- IHCH-7113
- Mefloquine
- NDTDI
- RH-34
- SCHEMBL5334361
- WAY-163909
- Z3517967757
