= List of miscellaneous 5-HT2A receptor agonists =

This is a list of miscellaneous agonists of the serotonin receptor subtype 5-HT_{2A} (and other 5-HT_{2} subtypes to a varying extent) that fall outside the common structural classes. Most agonists at this receptor are either substituted phenethylamine derivatives from the 2C, DOx and 25-NB groups, or substituted tryptamines and related compounds along with more complex derivatives of these such as lysergamides and iboga-type alkaloids. There are however numerous 5-HT_{2A} receptor agonists which do not fall within any of these groups, some representative examples of which are listed below. K_{i} and EC_{50} values vary depending on the assay conditions used and so may not be directly comparable between sources. Many of these compounds have been designed to be non-psychoactive derivatives for medical applications, and it should not be assumed that a compound which acts as a 5-HT_{2A} agonist will necessarily be psychedelic in nature.

Structure	Name	Chemical name	h5-HT_{2A} K_{i} (EC_{50}) (nM)	PubChem	CAS #	Ref
	Compound 11a	11-chloro-2,3,4,5-tetrahydro-1H-[1,4]diazepino[1,7-a]indole	6.5	20726100	599173-28-1	
	Compound 23	9-Chloro-7-(2-ethoxy-phenyl)-2,3,4,5-tetrahydro-1H-[1,4]diazepino[1,7-a]indole	32	44315398	599173-25-8	
	Compound 10d	7-Benzyloxy-8-bromo-1-methyl-2,3,4,5-tetrahydro-1H-3-benzazepine	22	10472780	616201-60-6	
	Example 22.67	4-(6,7,8,9-tetrahydro-5H-pyrido[2,3-d]azepin-2-yl)thiomorpholine	21	44124494	1003589-43-2	
	A93	1,2,3,4,5,6-hexahydroazepino[4,5-b]indol-10-ol	(4)	170377352	3006788-03-7	
	Pharm-136	7-methyl-1,2,3,4,5,6-hexahydroazepino[4,5-b]indol-10-ol	(0.6)	170319648	3006787-99-8	
	N-Bn-THAZ (compound 3d)	2-benzyl-5,6,7,8-tetrahydro-4H-[1,2]oxazolo[4,5-d]azepin-3-one	(550)	14515725	125115-66-4	
	O-Bn-THAZ (compound 4d)	3-phenylmethoxy-5,6,7,8-tetrahydro-4H-[1,2]oxazolo[4,5-d]azepine	(245)	71562661	?	
	UCD0179 (4-desmethylene-LSD; compound 11 or formula IIa)	(3R)-N,N-diethyl-5-(1H-indol-4-yl)-1-methyl-3,6-dihydro-2H-pyridine-3-carboxamide	(<10)	156278040	2640392-28-3	
	NEtPhOH-THPI (compound 24c)	2-{2-[5-(1H-indol-3-yl)-3,6-dihydropyridin-1(2H)-yl]ethyl}phenol	(58.43)			
	1-Ethyl-6-hydroxytryptoline (compound 29)	1-ethyl-2,3,4,9-tetrahydro-1H-pyrido[3,4-b]indol-6-ol	(195)	3071387	?	
	Compound 13	4,4,5,12-tetramethyl-5,8,10-triazatricyclo[7.4.0.0^{2,7}]trideca-1(9),2(7),10,12-tetraene		162388675	2755671-89-5	
	1-(2,4,5-Trimethoxyphenyl)-6-chlorotryptoline (compound 106)	6-chloro-1-(2,4,5-trimethoxyphenyl)-2,3,4,9-tetrahydro-1H-pyrido[3,4-b]indole	(1.7)	4376990	528525-37-3	
	Compound 6c	(6S)-2,3-dichloro-7,8,9,10-tetrahydro-6H-6,9-epiminocyclohepta[b]quinoxaline	(400)		2991367-88-3	
	Compound 70	3-(4-bromo-2-methylpyrazol-3-yl)-N-(4-chlorophenyl)-4-methoxyaniline	1.77	9952456	720702-40-9	
	Compound 22	7-(trifluoromethoxy)-2,3,4,10b-tetrahydro-1H-pyrazino[1,2-b]isoindol-6-one	67 (87)	11448649	850033-15-7	
	ZC-B (Example 1)	3-(4-bromo-2,5-dimethoxyphenyl)azetidine	(1.6)	156337249	2641630-65-9	
	2C-B-aminorex	5-(4-bromo-2,5-dimethoxyphenyl)-4,5-dihydro-1,3-oxazol-2-amine		165360199		
	2C-B-morpholine	2-(2,5-dimethoxy-4-bromophenyl)morpholine	20.6	11429275	807631-07-8	
	Lorcaserin	(1R)-8-chloro-1-methyl-2,3,4,5-tetrahydro-1H-3-benzazepine	(158)	11658860	616202-92-7	
	7-Chlorolorcaserin	(1R)-7,8-dichloro-1-methyl-2,3,4,5-tetrahydro-1H-3-benzazepine	(10)	24773649	1006037-48-4	
	DM-506 (ibogaminalog)	3-methyl-2,4,5,6-tetrahydro-1H-azepino[4,5-b]indole		24183	7546-66-9	
	PHA-57378	2,7,8,9,10,11-hexahydro-1H-azepino[4,5-b][1,4]oxazino[2,3,4-hi]indole	4.1	10198481	303798-94-9	
	C4-Gly-CH_{2}NMe-Tmn	8-methyl-2,6,7,8,9,10-hexahydroazocino[4,5,6-cd]indole				
	LPH-5	(3S)-3-[2,5-dimethoxy-4-(trifluoromethyl)phenyl]piperidine	(3.2)	156337168	2641630-97-7	
	2C-B-PP	1-(2,5-dimethoxy-4-bromophenyl)piperazine		4738744	100939-87-5	
	ENX-105	5-chloro-2-methoxy-N-((2R,3R)-2-methyl-1-(phenylmethyl-d2)pyrrolidin-3-yl)-4-((methyl-d3)amino)benzamide			2950168-16-6	
	UH-232 ((+)-UH-232)	(1S,2R)-5-methoxy-1-methyl-N,N-dipropyl-1,2,3,4-tetrahydronaphthalen-2-amine	118	6604756	95999-12-5	
	cis-Urocanic acid (cis-UCA; (Z)-imidazole-4-acrylic acid)	(Z)-3-(1H-imidazol-5-yl)prop-2-enoic acid	4.6	1549103	7699-35-6	
	CPD-1	(3S)-3-Methyl-1-[4-(trifluoromethyl)-1-benzofuran-7-yl]piperazine		9925822	325145-37-7	
	Efavirenz	(4S)-6-Chloro-4-(2-cyclopropylethynyl)-4-(trifluoromethyl)-2,4-dihydro-1H-3,1-benzoxazin-2-one		64139	154598-52-4	
	2MePI	2-methyl-1,3,4,5-tetrahydropyrido[4,3-b]indole	(533)	97424	5094-12-2	
	Tiflucarbine	9-ethyl-4-fluoro-1-methyl-7,8,9,10-tetrahydro-6H-pyrido[4,3-b]thieno[3,2-e]indole		65677	89875-86-5	
	IHCH-1480	7-(1,2,3,6-tetrahydropyridin-4-yl)-2,3-dihydro-1H-inden-4-ol	129	178616586		
	IHCH-1491	4-(2,3,4,5-tetrahydro-1-benzoxepin-9-yl)-1,2,3,6-tetrahydropyridine	355			
	IHCH-1906	4-(1,2,3,6-tetrahydropyridin-4-yl)-6,7,8,9-tetrahydro-5H-benzo[7]annulen-1-ol	126			
	IHCH-6082	2-(piperazin-1-yl)-5,6,7,8,9,10-hexahydrocycloocta[b]pyridine	741			
	IHCH-6122	3-(piperazin-1-yl)-5,6,7,8-tetrahydroisoquinoline	85.1	176915195		
	IHCH-7079	(6bR,10aS)-8-(2-Methoxyphenethyl)-3-methyl-2,3,6b,7,8,9,10,10a-octahydro-1H-pyrido[3',4':4,5]pyrrolo[1,2,3-de]quinoxaline		169488014	2957888-63-8	
	IHCH-7113	(6bR,10aS)-3-methyl-2,3,6b,7,8,9,10,10a-octahydro-1H-pyrido[3',4':4,5]pyrrolo[1,2,3-de]quinoxaline		21302499	313368-85-3	
	IHCH-8110	N-methyl-N-(trans-4-aminocyclohexyl)-N'-(4-n-hexyloxybenzyl)urea	48 (93–479)	?	?	
	ITI-1549	(6b'R,10a'S)-8'-[2-(1,2-benzoxazol-3-yl)ethyl]-2',3',6b',9',10',10a'-hexahydro-3'-methylspiro[cyclopropane-1,2'-[1H,7H]pyrido[3',4':4,5]pyrrolo[1,2,3-de]quinoxaline]	10.2	?	?	
	NDTDI	N,N-diethyl-3-[methyl(1,3,4,5-tetrahydrobenzo[cd]indol-4-yl)amino]propanamide		163192742		
	ORG-12962	1-(5-trifluoromethyl-6-chloropyridin-2-yl)piperazine		9796408	210821-63-9	
	"Compound 3ci"	1-(3-iodophenyl)-4-(2-(pyridin-2-yl)ethyl)piperazine	(1,986)			
	"Compound 3dh"	1-(2-(pyridin-4-yl)ethyl)-4-(3-(trifluoromethoxy)phenyl)piperazine	(251)			
	ORG-37684	(3S)-3-[(2,3-dihydro-5-methoxy-1H-inden-4-yl)oxy]pyrrolidine		9794656	213007-95-5	
	OSU-6162	(3S)-3-[3-(methylsulfonyl)phenyl]-1-propylpiperidine		9795741	156907-84-5	
	P-54	2-(5-methoxypyrazolo[1,5-a]pyridin-3-yl)-N,N-dimethylethanamine		168946740	2943954-59-2	
	S22	3-[2-[(1R,5S)-2-azabicyclo[3.1.0]hexan-2-yl]ethyl]-5-fluoro-1H-pyrrolo[3,2-b]pyridine	(2.92)	178831971		
	I-28	N-[2-(8-methoxynaphthalen-1-yl)ethyl]-N-methylpropan-2-amine	(191)	170604481	3019268-34-6	
	Mefloquine	2,8-bis(trifluoromethyl)quinolin-4-yl-(2-piperidyl)methanol	341–2,940 (1,990)	40692	53230-10-7	
	I-3	(1R)-4-(1-benzothiophen-7-yl)cyclohex-3-en-1-amine		83261564		
	I-74	3-(azetidin-3-ylidenemethyl)-1H-pyrrolo[2,3-b]pyridine		178679378		
	(R)-69	3-[(5R)-5-methyl-1,2,5,6-tetrahydropyridin-3-yl]-1H-pyrrolo[2,3-b]pyridine		164513426	2765652-48-8	
	(R)-70	3-[(3R)-1,3-dimethyl-3,6-dihydro-2H-pyridin-5-yl]-1H-pyrrolo[2,3-b]pyridine		170328782		
	RS134-49	4-methyl-3-(1,2,3,6-tetrahydropyridin-5-yl)-1H-indole		168941768	2945139-94-4	
	Compound 161-2	3-[(5S)-5-methyl-1,2,5,6-tetrahydropyridin-3-yl]-1,2-benzothiazole		168995054	2956765-08-3	
	'Z7149	1-methyl-6-(1,2,3,6-tetrahydropyridin-5-yl)indole		176491927		
	RH-34	3-[2-(2-methoxybenzylamino)ethyl]-1H-quinazoline-2,4-dione		10041987	1028307-48-3	
	SCHEMBL5334361	7-[(3-methoxyphenoxy)methyl]-2,3,4,5-tetrahydro-1H-3-benzazepine	(0.4)	59027940	959867-47-1	
	Tabernanthalog	8-methoxy-3-methyl-2,4,5,6-tetrahydro-1H-azepino[4,5-b]indole		146026994	2483829-59-8	
	TKU-II-100	[(1S,2S)-2-(2-fluorophenyl)cyclopropyl]methanamine	0.62	44572747	1821802-54-3	
	Compound 22	2-[[[[2-(5-Fluoro-2-methoxyphenyl)cyclopropyl]methyl]amino]methyl]phenol	(77)			
	WAY-470	1,16-diazatetracyclo[8.8.1.0^{2,9}.0^{14,19}]-nonadeca-2(9),10,12,14(19)-tetraene	36	10037962	422318-22-7	
	WXVL_BT0793LQ2118 (Q2118)	6-fluoro-4-(1-methyl-1,2,5,6-tetrahydropyridin-3-yl)-1H-indole		171676435		
	Z2825713589	(4-amino-3,3a,4,5,6,6a-hexahydro-1H-cyclopenta[c]pyrrol-2-yl)-(6-methoxypyrazin-2-yl)methanone		167788805		
	Z2876442907	ethyl 2-[[2-(4-methyl-1H-indol-3-yl)ethylamino]methyl]-1,3-thiazole-5-carboxylate		167850865		
	Z3517967757 (Z7757, YEQ)	4-[1-(1-pyrimidin-2-ylethyl)piperidin-3-yl]phenol		167949972	2817502-85-3	
	Z3881312504 (Z2504)	2-bromo-4-[2-[methyl-[2-(1,3-thiazol-2-yl)ethyl]amino]ethyl]phenol		167904469		
	Z4154032166	2,2,2-trifluoro-1-[6-(1,2,3,6-tetrahydropyridin-5-yl)pyridin-2-yl]ethanol		167878716		
	Z5247692566	4-[(3,3-dimethyloxolan-2-yl)methyl]-3-[(1H-indol-3-yl)methyl]morpholine				
	Z5247692629	1-(1-bicyclo[1.1.1]pentanyl)-4-[[5-(4-chlorophenyl)-1H-pyrazol-4-yl]methyl]piperazine		166358273	2728554-00-3	
	RU-28306	N,N-dimethyl-1,3,4,5-tetrahydrobenzo[cd]indol-4-amine	314 (5-HT_{2})	194528	73625-11-3	
	(S)-Glaucine	(6aS)-1,2,9,10-tetramethoxy-6-methyl-5,6,6a,7-tetrahydro-4H-dibenzo[de,g]quinoline	966 (661)	16754	475-81-0	
	11-Methoxyasimilobine (1,11-dimethoxy-2-hydroxynoraporphine; "compound 16l")	1,11-dimethoxy-5,6,6a,7-tetrahydro-4H-dibenzo[de,g]quinolin-2-ol	(18)	175794276	?	
	2-Hydroxy-11-propoxynoraporphine ("compound 20n")	11-propoxy-5,6,6a,7-tetrahydro-4H-dibenzo[de,g]quinolin-2-ol	(5.5–14)	175794265	?	
	2-Hydroxy-11-(2-methylallyl)oxynoraporphine ("compound 20s")	11-(2-methylprop-2-enoxy)-5,6,6a,7-tetrahydro-4H-dibenzo[de,g]quinolin-2-ol	(6.3–9.4)	175794278	?	

== Others ==
Analogues of aripiprazole with serotonin 5-HT_{2A} receptor agonism and psychedelic-like effects have been reported.

== See also ==
- 5-HT2A receptor agonist
- Partial lysergamide
- DPCPX
- LY-341,495
- Robalzotan
- WAY-100635
- UH-301
- Head-twitch response
- Substituted benzofuran
- Substituted phenylmorpholine
- List of fentanyl analogues
