= Γ-Carboline =

γ-Carboline

Names
- Preferred IUPAC name 5H-Pyrido[4,3-b]indole
- Other names 5H-γ-Carboline

Identifiers
CAS Number	244-69-9
3D model (JSmol)	Interactive image
ChEMBL	ChEMBL12540
ChemSpider	115684
ECHA InfoCard	100.383.422
PubChem CID	130802
UNII	89407EP2HE
CompTox Dashboard (EPA)	DTXSID80179147
- InChI: InChI=1S/C11H8N2/c1-2-4-10-8(3-1)9-7-12-6-5-11(9)13-10/h1-7,13H Key: RDMFHRSPDKWERA-UHFFFAOYSA-N
- SMILES: C1=CC=C2C(=C1)C3=C(N2)C=CN=C3

Properties
Chemical formula	C_{11}H_{8}N_{2}
Molar mass	168.20 g/mol
- Except where otherwise noted, data are given for materials in their standard state (at 25 °C [77 °F], 100 kPa). Infobox references

γ-Carboline, or gamma-carboline, also known as 5H-pyrido[4,3-b]indole is a nitrogen-containing tricyclic heterocycle. A large number of derivatives are known with varying pharmacological properties. Tetrahydrogenated γ-carbolines like 2MePI are serotonin 5-HT_{2A} receptor modulators. The pyridopyrroloquinoxalines are cyclized γ-carbolines and include serotonergic psychedelics like IHCH-7113, non-hallucinogenic serotonin 5-HT_{2A} receptor agonists like IHCH-7079, IHCH-7086, and ITI-1549, and serotonin 5-HT_{2A} receptor antagonists like lumateperone (ITI-007).

Chemical structures of γ-carboline and selected derivatives
γ-Carboline

2MePI

IHCH-7113

== See also ==
- β-Carboline
- Tiflucarbine
