= ITI-333 =

Chemical compound

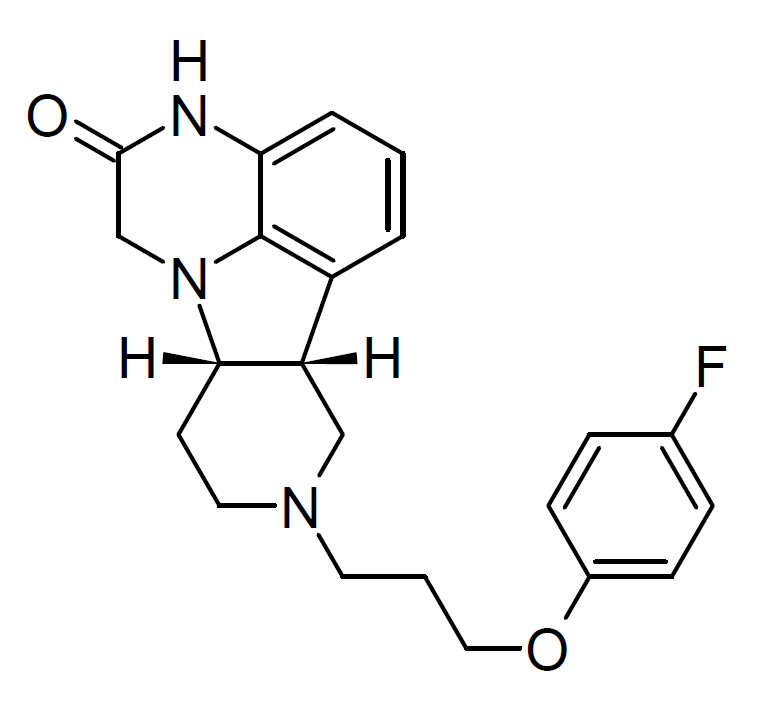

Identifiers
- IUPAC name: (6bR,10aS)-8-[3-(4-fluorophenoxy)propyl]-6b,7,8,9,10,10a-hexahydro-1H-pyrido[3′,4′:4,5]pyrrolo[1,2,3-de]quinoxalin-2(3H)-one
- CAS Number: 2117619-00-6
- PubChem CID: 130277831
- ChemSpider: 129379455
- UNII: KHR1GLK9D0
- ChEMBL: ChEMBL5558524

Chemical and physical data
- Formula: C_{22}H_{24}FN_{3}O
- Molar mass: 365.452 g·mol^{−1}
- 3D model (JSmol): Interactive image
- SMILES: C1CN(C[C@@H]2[C@H]1N3CC(=O)NC4=CC=CC2=C43)CCCOC5=CC=C(C=C5)F
- InChI: InChI=1S/C22H24FN3O2/c23-15-5-7-16(8-6-15)28-12-2-10-25-11-9-20-18(13-25)17-3-1-4-19-22(17)26(20)14-21(27)24-19/h1,3-8,18,20H,2,9-14H2,(H,24,27)/t18-,20-/m0/s1; Key:MXIJXDUPULMKIE-ICSRJNTNSA-N

ITI-333 is a drug which has a mixed mechanism of action, acting as an antagonist at the 5-HT_{2A}, D_{1} and α1A receptors, and also as a partial agonist at the μ-opioid receptor. In animal studies it blocked the head-twitch response produced by DOI and also reduced responses to morphine, while also reducing the symptoms produced by naloxone-precipitated withdrawal in opioid habituated mice. It has been developed for potential uses in treatment of opioid withdrawal and opioid use disorder.

== See also ==
- IHCH-7079
- IHCH-7086
- IHCH-7113
- IHCH-8134
- Lumateperone
