= ZINC000443438219 =

Clinical data
- Other names: Z0443438219; '8219
- Drug class: Atypical selective serotonin reuptake inhibitor (SSRI)
- ATC code: None

Identifiers
- IUPAC name: 2-[(2R)-2,4-dimethylpiperazin-1-yl]-4-(4-fluorophenyl)-1,3-thiazole
- PubChem CID: 176472409

Chemical and physical data
- Formula: C_{15}H_{18}FN_{3}S
- Molar mass: 291.39 g·mol^{−1}
- 3D model (JSmol): Interactive image
- SMILES: C[C@@H]1CN(CCN1C2=NC(=CS2)C3=CC=C(C=C3)F)C
- InChI: InChI=1S/C15H18FN3S/c1-11-9-18(2)7-8-19(11)15-17-14(10-20-15)12-3-5-13(16)6-4-12/h3-6,10-11H,7-9H2,1-2H3/t11-/m1/s1; Key:DOEGVNLCJHQXNX-LLVKDONJSA-N

ZINC000443438219 (also known as Z0443438219 or '8219) is a piperazine derivative which acts as a potent and selective serotonin reuptake inhibitor (SSRI). It was developed as an elaborated hit from an ultra-large-scale docking screen, looking for molecules which would bind to the orthosteric site of the serotonin transporter (SERT) in the extracellular-closed, inward-open state favored by compounds such as ibogaine, noribogaine, and MDMA, as opposed to the outward-open conformation favored by compounds such as cocaine and conventional SSRI antidepressants like fluoxetine or citalopram. (R)-'8219 binds to SERT with a binding affinity (K_{i}) of 3 nM and produced antidepressant- and anxiolytic-like effects as well as reduced opioid withdrawal in animal studies, while the (S) enantiomer '8221 was also active but with a much weaker K_{i} of 170 nM. The drug is not a substrate-type serotonin releasing agent. Another analogue with similar activities that was also studied is ZINC000006658090 ('8090). '8219 was first described in the scientific literature by Bryan L. Roth and colleagues in 2023.

== See also ==
- Substituted piperazine
- SNTX-2643
- Z3517967757
- Z8526711350
- Z8779877149
