= RS130-180 =

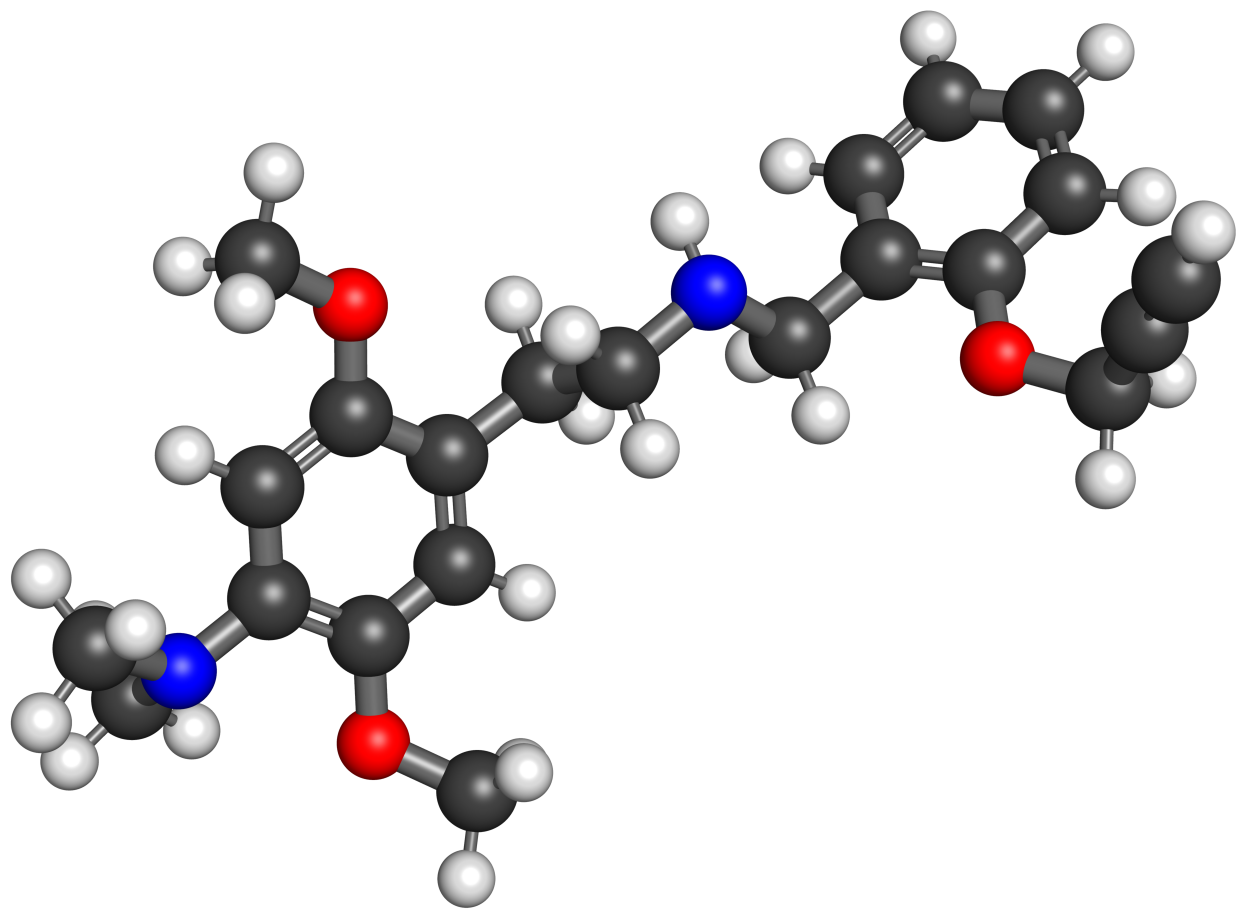

Clinical data
- Other names: RS-130-180; A1AFX; N-(2-Propargyloxy)-2,5-dimethoxy-4-(dimethylamino)phenethylamine
- Drug class: β-Arrestin-biased serotonin 5-HT_{2A} receptor agonist

Identifiers
- IUPAC name: 2,5-dimethoxy-N,N-dimethyl-4-(2-((2-(prop-2-yn-1-yloxy)benzyl)amino)ethyl)aniline
- PubChem CID: 172908698
- ChemSpider: 133322398
- PDB ligand: A1AFX (PDBe, RCSB PDB)

Chemical and physical data
- Formula: C_{22}H_{28}N_{2}O_{3}
- Molar mass: 368.477 g·mol^{−1}
- 3D model (JSmol): Interactive image
- SMILES: C(OC)1=C(N(C)C)C=C(OC)C(CCN([H])CC2=C(OCC#C)C=CC=C2)=C1
- InChI: InChI=1S/C22H28N2O3/c1-6-13-27-20-10-8-7-9-18(20)16-23-12-11-17-14-22(26-5)19(24(2)3)15-21(17)25-4/h1,7-10,14-15,23H,11-13,16H2,2-5H3; Key:NDHJMNFRHQYXKX-UHFFFAOYSA-N

RS130-180, also known as N-(2-propargyloxy)-2,5-dimethoxy-4-(dimethylamino)phenethylamine, is a β-arrestin-biased serotonin 5-HT_{2A} receptor agonist of the phenethylamine, 2C, and NBOMe families. It is the NBOMe derivative in which the phenyl ring has an N,N-dimethylamino substitution at the 4 position and the 2-position methoxy group on the benzyl ring has been replaced with a propynyloxy group.

The drug favors activation of β-arrestin signaling over G_{q} signaling. RS130-180 is said to be useful for in-vitro studies, but to have suboptimal pharmacokinetic properties for in-vivo use. β-Arrestin-biased serotonin 5-HT_{2A} receptor agonists do not produce the head-twitch response in rodents and it is thought that they may be non-hallucinogenic in humans. The cryo-EM structures of the serotonin 5-HT_{2A} receptor with RS130-180, as well as with various serotonergic psychedelics, have been solved and published by Bryan Roth and colleagues.

RS130-180 was first described in the literature by 2022. It was derived from an earlier compound called ZINC000341335936, which was identified via in-silico screening of 1.6 billion molecules for serotonin 5-HT_{2A} receptor agonism with AlphaFold2. RS130-180 was developed via structural modification of ZINC000341335936 by David E. Nichols and colleagues.

== See also ==
- 25-NB
- List of miscellaneous 5-HT_{2A} receptor agonists
- Non-hallucinogenic 5-HT_{2A} receptor agonist
- 25N-NBOMe
- 25N-NBPh
- 25N-N1-Nap
- 25CN-NBOMe
- 25CN-NBOH
- Ultra-large-scale docking
