= Tetrahydropyridinylpyrrolopyridine =

Organic compound

Tetrahydropyridinylpyrrolopyridines are a group of pyrrolopyridine–tetrahydropyridine derivatives related to the tryptamines. They are not tryptamines themselves, as they feature a pyrrolopyridine instead of indole ring system. The compounds include (R)-69, (R)-70, and CP-94253. They are known to act as serotonin receptor agonists, including of the serotonin 5-HT_{1} and/or 5-HT_{2} receptors. Some tetrahydropyridinylpyrrolopyridines, such as (R)-69 and (R)-70, were discovered by Bryan L. Roth and colleagues via ultra-large-scale docking.

Chemical structures of selected tetrahydropyridinylpyrrolopyridines
(R)-69

(R)-70

CP-93129

CP-94253

== See also ==
- Cyclized tryptamine
- Substituted tryptamine § Related compounds
- Indazolethylamine
- Indolizinylethylamine
- List of miscellaneous 5-HT_{2A} receptor agonists
- Ultra-large-scale docking
- WAY-208466
- Non-hallucinogenic 5-HT_{2A} receptor agonist
