= Z8779877149 =

Clinical data
- Other names: A1CIZ; Z7149; '7149
- Drug class: Serotonin reuptake inhibitor; α_{2A}-Adrenergic receptor agonist; Serotonin 5-HT_{2A} receptor agonist
- ATC code: None

Identifiers
- IUPAC name: 1-methyl-6-(1,2,3,6-tetrahydropyridin-5-yl)indole
- PubChem CID: 176491927

Chemical and physical data
- Formula: C_{14}H_{16}N_{2}
- Molar mass: 212.296 g·mol^{−1}
- 3D model (JSmol): Interactive image
- SMILES: CN1C=CC2=C1C=C(C=C2)C3=CCCNC3
- InChI: InChI=1S/C14H16N2/c1-16-8-6-11-4-5-12(9-14(11)16)13-3-2-7-15-10-13/h3-6,8-9,15H,2,7,10H2,1H3; Key:HGHJTLFFTQPAOS-UHFFFAOYSA-N

Z8779877149 (also known as A1CIZ, Z7149 or just '7149) is an indole derivative which acts at multiple targets, being a potent and selective serotonin reuptake inhibitor (SSRI), an agonist of the α_{2A} adrenergic receptor, and a 5-HT_{2A} receptor agonist. It was developed through an ultra-large-scale docking screen looking for compounds which would bind simultaneously at multiple targets, with the aim being to find compounds which would show both SSRI and α_{2A} agonist activity, but off-target screening subsequently showed that it also acts as a 5-HT_{2A} receptor agonist with similar potency. It has a binding affinity of 198 nM at the serotonin transporter (SERT) and 180 nM at α_{2A}, with an EC_{50} of 170 nM at α_{2A} and an EC_{50} of 172 nM at the 5-HT_{2A} receptor, and an efficacy of 76% at 5-HT_{2A} making it a partial agonist. In animal studies, '7149 showed results consistent with antidepressant, anxiolytic and analgesic effects thought to result from a combination of activity at all three targets.

== See also ==
- (R)-69
- Z3517967757
- Z8526711350
- ZINC000443438219
