= C18H19N3O3 =

The molecular formula C_{18}H_{19}N_{3}O_{3} may refer to:

- Ainuovirine
- RH-34
