= IHCH-2330 =

Clinical data
- Other names: IHCH2330
- Drug class: Serotonin 5-HT_{2A} receptor agonist; Serotonin 5-HT_{2C} receptor agonist; Serotonin 5-HT_{2B} receptor antagonist
- ATC code: None

Identifiers
- IUPAC name: 3-[2-[2-[2,5-dimethoxy-4-(trifluoromethyl)phenyl]ethyl-methyl-amino]ethyl]-2-methyl-pyrido[1,2-a]pyrimidin-4-one
- PubChem CID: 179075566

Chemical and physical data
- Formula: C_{23}H_{26}F_{3}N_{3}O_{3}
- Molar mass: 449.474 g·mol^{−1}
- 3D model (JSmol): Interactive image
- SMILES: COc1cc(CCN(C)CCC=2C(=O)N3C=CC=CC3=NC=2C)c(OC)cc1C(F)(F)F
- InChI: InChI=1S/C23H26F3N3O3/c1-15-17(22(30)29-10-6-5-7-21(29)27-15)9-12-28(2)11-8-16-13-20(32-4)18(23(24,25)26)14-19(16)31-3/h5-7,10,13-14H,8-9,11-12H2,1-4H3; Key:YRZLOPLPHUOJSL-UHFFFAOYSA-N

IHCH-2330 is a serotonergic drug related to compounds such as 2C-TFM and 25TFM-NBOMe. It acts as an agonist at the 5-HT_{2A} and 5-HT_{2C} receptors but is an antagonist at the 5-HT_{2B} receptor, a profile which is hoped to eliminate the issues with cardiac valvulopathies associated with related compounds that act as agonists of 5-HT_{2B}. While phenethylamine derivatives with an N-benzyl substitution such as 25TFM-NBOMe are able to bind to both 5-HT_{2A} and 5-HT_{2B} in an agonist-like conformation, IHCH-2330 was designed to exploit differences in the shape of the extended binding pocket adjacent to the active site which is occupied by 5-HT_{2} antagonist ligands such as risperidone. The pyridopyrimidinone group is able to occupy a side-extended pocket in 5-HT_{2A} which retains an agonist-like bound conformation for the 4-trifluoromethyl group at the other end of the molecule, but in the 5-HT_{2B} receptor the larger extended binding pocket causes the pyridopyrimidinone group to flip upward into the same position occupied by the pyridopyrimidinone group of risperidone, which pushes the receptor into an antagonist conformation. This builds upon earlier work using compounds such as Z3881312504 which exploits the same structural difference between the 5-HT_{2A} and 5-HT_{2B} receptors and shows a similar separation of 5-HT_{2A} agonist from 5-HT_{2B} antagonist activity, but with considerably lower potency.

== See also ==
- IHCH-6122
