= R70 =

R70 may refer to:

- (R-70), a serotonin receptor agonist
- R70 (South Africa), a road
- R70, designation of the sole train service on the Aigle–Leysin railway line
- Aeryon SkyRanger R70, an unmanned aerial vehicle
- Small nucleolar RNA Z152/R70/R12
- Toyota Noah (R70), a minivan
