= Z2876442907 =

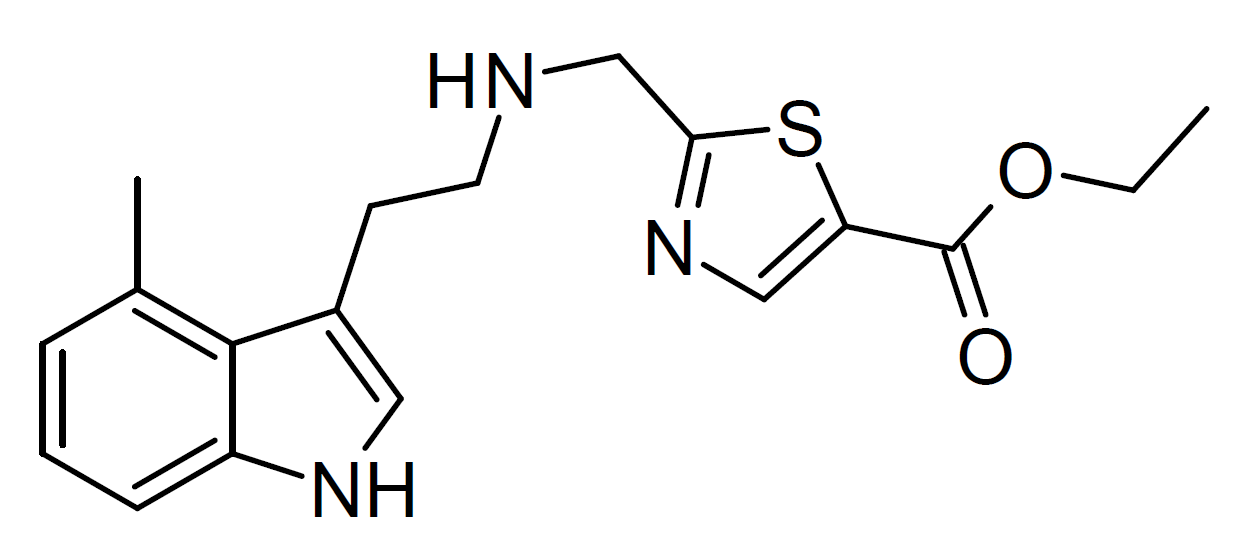

Clinical data
- Drug class: Serotonin 5-HT_{2A} receptor agonist
- ATC code: None

Identifiers
- IUPAC name: ethyl 2-[[2-(4-methyl-1H-indol-3-yl)ethylamino]methyl]-1,3-thiazole-5-carboxylate
- PubChem CID: 167850865

Chemical and physical data
- Formula: C_{18}H_{21}N_{3}O_{2}S
- Molar mass: 343.45 g·mol^{−1}
- 3D model (JSmol): Interactive image
- SMILES: CCOC(=O)C1=CN=C(S1)CNCCC2=CNC3=CC=CC(=C32)C
- InChI: InChI=1S/C18H21N3O2S/c1-3-23-18(22)15-10-21-16(24-15)11-19-8-7-13-9-20-14-6-4-5-12(2)17(13)14/h4-6,9-10,19-20H,3,7-8,11H2,1-2H3; Key:DXXCNVVKOUYAQV-UHFFFAOYSA-N

Z2876442907 (Z2907) is a tryptamine derivative which acts as a serotonin 5-HT_{2A} receptor agonist. It was discovered from a molecule docking screen against the AlphaFold model of the 5-HT_{2A} receptor. As its 5-HT_{2A} agonist activity has only been established in vitro, it is not yet established whether it produces psychedelic effects in animal models. It is structurally similar to other 5-HT_{2A} agonist tryptamine derivatives such as 5-MeO-T-NBOMe and NEtPhOH-THPI, as well as the 5-HT_{6} antagonist idalopirdine.

== See also ==
- Substituted tryptamine
- 4-Methyl-AMT
- 4-Methyl-AET
- RS134-49
- WXVL BT0793LQ2118
- Z3517967757
- Ultra-large-scale docking
