= Z3881312504 =

Clinical data
- Other names: Z2504
- Drug class: Serotonin 5-HT_{2A} receptor agonist; Serotonin 5-HT_{2B} receptor antagonist; Serotonin 5-HT_{2C} receptor antagonist
- ATC code: None

Identifiers
- IUPAC name: 2-bromo-4-[2-[methyl-[2-(1,3-thiazol-2-yl)ethyl]amino]ethyl]phenol
- PubChem CID: 167904469

Chemical and physical data
- Formula: C_{14}H_{17}BrN_{2}OS
- Molar mass: 341.27 g·mol^{−1}
- 3D model (JSmol): Interactive image
- SMILES: CN(CCC1=CC(=C(C=C1)O)Br)CCC2=NC=CS2
- InChI: InChI=1S/C14H17BrN2OS/c1-17(8-5-14-16-6-9-19-14)7-4-11-2-3-13(18)12(15)10-11/h2-3,6,9-10,18H,4-5,7-8H2,1H3; Key:MJRZTSVZPUQLHJ-UHFFFAOYSA-N

Z3881312504 (also known as Z2504) is a substituted phenethylamine derivative which acts as a serotonin receptor modulator. It binds to the 5-HT_{2A}, 5-HT_{2B} and 5-HT_{2C} receptors with fairly similar affinity, but while it is a reasonably potent partial agonist of 5-HT_{2A}, its efficacy at the 5-HT_{2B} and 5-HT_{2C} receptors is negligible, making it a functional antagonist at these receptors. Study of the binding mode of Z2504 and how it achieves functional selectivity for 5-HT_{2A} despite similar binding at all three subtypes has led to the subsequent development of compounds such as IHCH-2330 and IHCH-6122 which are more potent as both 5-HT_{2A} agonists and 5-HT_{2B} antagonists, and may have potential for clinical development as antidepressants.

== See also ==
- Substituted phenethylamine
- 25-NB (psychedelics)
