= (R)-70 =

Chemical compound

Clinical data
- Other names: R-70
- Drug class: Non-hallucinogenic Serotonin 5-HT_{2A} receptor agonist
- ATC code: None

Identifiers
- IUPAC name: 3-[(3R)-1,3-dimethyl-3,6-dihydro-2H-pyridin-5-yl]-1H-pyrrolo[2,3-b]pyridine
- PubChem CID: 170328782
- ChemSpider: 138533824

Chemical and physical data
- Formula: C_{14}H_{17}N_{3}
- Molar mass: 227.311 g·mol^{−1}
- 3D model (JSmol): Interactive image
- SMILES: C[C@H]1CN(CC(=C1)C2=CNC3=C2C=CC=N3)C
- InChI: InChI=1S/C14H17N3/c1-10-6-11(9-17(2)8-10)13-7-16-14-12(13)4-3-5-15-14/h3-7,10H,8-9H2,1-2H3,(H,15,16)/t10-/m1/s1; Key:BVUHRQDBEWGRFX-SNVBAGLBSA-N

(R)-70, or R-70, is a non-hallucinogenic selective serotonin 5-HT_{2} receptor moderate-efficacy partial agonist of the tetrahydropyridinylpyrrolopyridine family related to the psychedelic tryptamines. It shows preference for activation of the serotonin 5-HT_{2A} receptor of about 6.4-fold relative to the serotonin 5-HT_{2B} receptor and of about 30-fold relative to the serotonin 5-HT_{2C} receptor. The drug is a biased agonist of the serotonin 5-HT_{2A} receptor, activating G_{q} protein signaling more readily than β-arrestin2 signaling. It did not significantly produce the head-twitch response in mice, but did produce antidepressant-like effects. (R)-70, along with its close analogue (R)-69, was first described in the scientific literature by Bryan L. Roth and colleagues in 2022. It was identified via an ultra-large-scale docking campaign for the serotonin 5-HT_{2A} receptor.

== See also ==
- Tetrahydropyridinylpyrrolopyridine
- Substituted tryptamine § Related compounds
- Cyclized tryptamine
- List of miscellaneous 5-HT_{2A} receptor agonists
- Non-hallucinogenic 5-HT_{2A} receptor agonist
- RU-24969
- RU-28253
- NEtPhOH-THPI
- SN-22
- VU6067416
- Z3517967757
- (R)-69
