= IHCH-7086 =

Chemical compound

Clinical data
- Drug class: Non-hallucinogenic serotonin 5-HT_{2A} receptor agonist

Identifiers
- IUPAC name: (6bR,10aS)-2,3,6b,7,8,9,10,10a-octahydro-8-[3-(2-methoxyphenyl)propyl]-3-methyl-1H-Pyrido[3′,4′:4,5]pyrrolo[1,2,3-de]quinoxaline
- CAS Number: 2957888-70-7
- PubChem CID: 162421364
- ChemSpider: 133324800

Chemical and physical data
- Formula: C_{24}H_{31}N_{3}O
- Molar mass: 377.532 g·mol^{−1}
- 3D model (JSmol): Interactive image
- SMILES: CN(CCN1[C@]2([H])[C@@]3([H])CN(CCCC4=CC=CC=C4OC)CC2)C5=C1C3=CC=C5
- InChI: InChI=1S/C24H31N3O/c1-25-15-16-27-21-12-14-26(13-6-8-18-7-3-4-11-23(18)28-2)17-20(21)19-9-5-10-22(25)24(19)27/h3-5,7,9-11,20-21H,6,8,12-17H2,1-2H3/t20-,21-/m0/s1; Key:WFYFRJAKNJVZMP-SFTDATJTSA-N

IHCH-7086 is a non-hallucinogenic serotonin 5-HT_{2A} receptor biased agonist of the pyridopyrroloquinoxaline family. It was derived via structural simplification of the serotonin 5-HT_{2A} receptor antagonist and atypical antipsychotic lumateperone. The drug produces antidepressant-like effects but not psychedelic-like effects in rodents. Other related compounds include IHCH-7079, which is a non-hallucinogenic serotonin 5-HT_{2A} receptor biased agonist similarly, and IHCH-7113, which produces the head-twitch response in rodents and hence would be expected to be hallucinogenic in humans.

== See also ==
- Pyridopyrroloquinoxaline
- Non-hallucinogenic 5-HT_{2A} receptor agonist
- Efavirenz
- IHCH-7079
- IHCH-7113
- IHCH-8134
- Mefloquine
- NDTDI
- RH-34
- SCHEMBL5334361
- WAY-163909
- Z3517967757
