= WAY-261240 =

Chemical compound

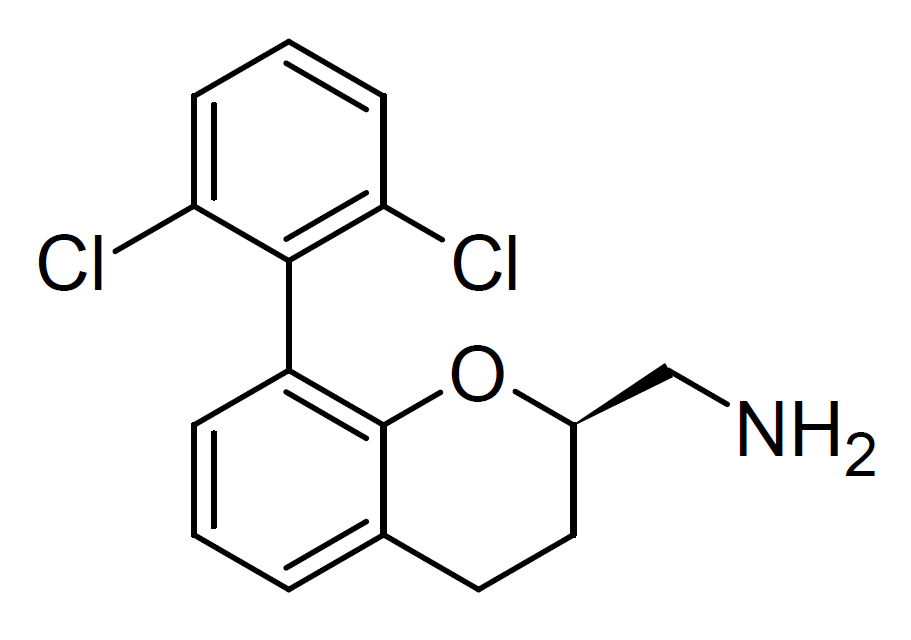

Identifiers
- IUPAC name: [(2R)-8-(2,6-dichlorophenyl)-3,4-dihydro-2H-chromen-2-yl]methanamine
- CAS Number: 913825-01-1
- PubChem CID: 17747578

Chemical and physical data
- Formula: C_{16}H_{15}Cl_{2}NO
- Molar mass: 308.20 g·mol^{−1}
- 3D model (JSmol): Interactive image
- SMILES: C1CC2=C(C(=CC=C2)C3=C(C=CC=C3Cl)Cl)O[C@H]1CN
- InChI: InChI=1S/C16H15Cl2NO/c17-13-5-2-6-14(18)15(13)12-4-1-3-10-7-8-11(9-19)20-16(10)12/h1-6,11H,7-9,19H2/t11-/m1/s1; Key:BNXPDLFCGJFNOG-LLVKDONJSA-N

WAY-261240 is a drug which acts as a potent and selective 5-HT_{2C} receptor agonist, though its affinity at other serotonin receptors has not been disclosed. It produces anorectic effects in animal studies. A large family of related derivatives is known.

== See also ==
- Lorcaserin
- WAY-163909
- WAY-470
