= EZS-8 =

Clinical data
- Other names: 3-(2-Aminoethyl)quinazoline-2,4-dione
- Drug class: Serotonin 5-HT_{2A} receptor partial agonist
- ATC code: None

Identifiers
- IUPAC name: 3-(2-aminoethyl)-1H-quinazoline-2,4-dione
- CAS Number: 144734-40-7
- PubChem CID: 10035843
- ChemSpider: 8211408
- ChEMBL: ChEMBL144442

Chemical and physical data
- Formula: C_{10}H_{11}N_{3}O_{2}
- Molar mass: 205.217 g·mol^{−1}
- 3D model (JSmol): Interactive image
- SMILES: C1=CC=C2C(=C1)C(=O)N(C(=O)N2)CCN
- InChI: InChI=1S/C10H11N3O2/c11-5-6-13-9(14)7-3-1-2-4-8(7)12-10(13)15/h1-4H,5-6,11H2,(H,12,15); Key:NTAUXYQQSCPGHT-UHFFFAOYSA-N

EZS-8, also known as 3-(2-aminoethyl)quinazoline-2,4-dione, is a very-low-potency serotonin 5-HT_{2A} receptor partial agonist related to ketanserin. It has about 0.15% of the potency (EC_{50} = 66,000 nM) and 46% of the efficacy (E_{max}) of serotonin as a serotonin 5-HT_{2A} receptor agonist in vitro. The N-(2-methoxy)benzyl analogue of EZS-8, RH-34, has 250-fold greater potency as a serotonin 5-HT_{2A} receptor agonist in comparison. EZS-8 was first described in the scientific literature by 1999. N-Benzyl derivatives of EZS-8 like RH-34 had been described as early as 1996 or 1998. Some other analogues of EZS-8 such as WL299 and WL163 have been described as well.

== See also ==
- List of miscellaneous 5-HT_{2A} receptor agonists
