= Pyridopyrroloquinoxaline =

Class of chemical compounds

Structure of IHCH-7113, a simple pyridopyrroloquinoxaline.

A substituted pyridopyrroloquinoxaline, or more specifically a substituted octahydro-1H-pyrido[3',4':4,5]pyrrolo[1,2,3-de]quinoxaline, also known as a substituted heterocycle fused γ-carboline, is a further-cyclized and substituted tetracyclic derivative of the tricyclic alkaloid γ-carboline as well as an analogue of the atypical antipsychotic lumateperone. They can additionally be thought of as analogues of cyclized tryptamines like the β-carbolines or harmala alkaloids such as harmaline, but are not technically tryptamines themselves.

Pyridopyrroloquinoxalines are notable for their varying interactions with the serotonin 5-HT_{2A} receptor as well as with other monoamine receptors. Lumateperone and deulumateperone are serotonin 5-HT_{2A} receptor antagonists with antipsychotic properties, IHCH-7113 is a putatively psychedelic serotonin 5-HT_{2A} receptor full agonist with a robust head-twitch response in rodents, and IHCH-7086, IHCH-7079, and ITI-1549 are putatively non-hallucinogenic β-arrestin-biased serotonin 5-HT_{2A} receptor partial agonists with psychoplastogenic and/or antidepressant-like effects in preclinical studies. The broad receptor interactions of some of these compounds have been studied.

Pyridopyrroloquinoxalines with serotonin 5-HT_{2A} receptor agonistic activity such as IHCH-7113 and IHCH-7086 were first described in the scientific literature by Dongmei Cao and colleagues by 2022. As of 2025, ITI-1549 is under development by Intra-Cellular Therapies for the treatment of mood and other psychiatric disorders.

== List of pyridopyrroloquinoxalines ==
Structure	Name	Chemical name
	IHCH-7113	(6bR,10aS)-3-methyl-2,3,6b,7,8,9,10,10a-octahydro-1H-pyrido[3',4':4,5]pyrrolo[1,2,3-de]quinoxaline
	IHCH-7079	(6bR,10aS)-2,3,6b,7,8,9,10,10a-octahydro-8-[2-(2-methoxyphenyl)ethyl]-3-methyl-1H-pyrido[3′,4′:4,5]pyrrolo[1,2,3-de]quinoxaline
	IHCH-7086	(6bR,10aS)-2,3,6b,7,8,9,10,10a-octahydro-8-[3-(2-methoxyphenyl)propyl]-3-methyl-1H-pyrido[3′,4′:4,5]pyrrolo[1,2,3-de]quinoxaline
	Lumateperone (ITI-007)	1-(4-fluorophenyl)-4-(3-methyl-2,3,6b,9,10,10a-hexahydro-1H-pyrido[3',4':4,5]pyrrolo[1,2,3-de]quinoxalin-8(7H)-yl)-1-butanone
	Deulumateperone (ITI-1284)	1-(4-fluorophenyl)-4-[(6bR,10aS)-3-methyl-2,3,6b,9,10,10a-(2-2H)hexahydro(2-2H)-1H-pyrido[3',4':4,5]pyrrolo[1,2,3-de]quinoxalin-8(7H)-yl]butan-1-one
	ITI-1549	(6b'R,10a'S)-8'-[2-(1,2-benzoxazol-3-yl)ethyl]-2',3',6b',9',10',10a'-hexahydro-3'-methylspiro[cyclopropane-1,2'-[1H,7H]pyrido[3',4':4,5]pyrrolo[1,2,3-de]quinoxaline]

Other known pyridopyrroloquinoxalines include IHCH-7081, IHCH-7087, IHCH-7088, IHCH-7089, IHCH-7112, and IHCH-7120.

== Related compounds ==
Structure	Name	Chemical name
	2MePI	2-methyl-1,3,4,5-tetrahydropyrido[4,3-b]indole
	Tiflucarbine	9-ethyl-4-fluoro-1-methyl-7,8,9,10-tetrahydro-6H-pyrido[4,3-b]thieno[3,2-e]indole
	IHCH-8134	(6bR,10aS)-8-(3-(2-methoxyphenyl)propyl)-1,2,6b,7,8,9,10,10a-octahydro-[1,4]oxazino[2,3,4-hi]pyrido[4,3-b]indole

== See also ==
- Cyclized tryptamine
- Substituted β-carboline
- Ibogalog
- Substituted lysergamide
- Non-hallucinogenic 5-HT_{2A} receptor agonist
