= Deulumateperone =

Clinical data
- Other names: Lumateperone deuterated; Deuterated lumateperone; ITI-1284; ITI1284; ITI-1284-ODT-SL
- Routes of administration: Sublingual (orally disintegrating tablet)
- Drug class: Atypical antipsychotic

Identifiers
- IUPAC name: 1-(4-fluorophenyl)-4-[(6bR,10aS)-3-methyl-2,3,6b,9,10,10a-(2-^{2}H)hexahydro(2-^{2}H)-1H-pyrido[3',4':4,5]pyrrolo[1,2,3-de]quinoxalin-8(7H)-yl]butan-1-one
- CAS Number: 2102683-75-8
- PubChem CID: 140916642
- UNII: NBA7J58PPP
- KEGG: D13268

Chemical and physical data
- Formula: C_{24}H_{26}D_{2}FN_{3}O
- Molar mass: 395.518 g·mol^{−1}
- 3D model (JSmol): Interactive image
- SMILES: CN1C([2H])([2H])CN2[C@H]3CCN(C[C@H]3C4=C2C1=CC=C4)CCCC(=O)C5=CC=C(C=C5)F
- InChI: InChI=1S/C24H28FN3O/c1-26-14-15-28-21-11-13-27(16-20(21)19-4-2-5-22(26)24(19)28)12-3-6-23(29)17-7-9-18(25)10-8-17/h2,4-5,7-10,20-21H,3,6,11-16H2,1H3/t20-,21-/m0/s1/i14D2; Key:HOIIHACBCFLJET-FTHFLAHXSA-N

Deulumateperone (INN; developmental code name ITI-1284) is an experimental antipsychotic of the pyridopyrroloquinoxaline and butyrophenone families as well as a deuterated analogue of lumateperone which is under development as a sublingually administered orally disintegrating tablet (ODT) for the treatment of psychotic disorders, agitation, and generalized anxiety disorder. No recent development has been reported for treatment of depressive disorders, behavioral disorders, and dementia. It is being developed by Intra-Cellular Therapies. As of January 2025, it has reached phase 2 clinical trials.

== See also ==
- Pyridopyrroloquinoxaline
- List of investigational antipsychotics
- List of investigational antidepressants
- List of investigational anxiolytics
- List of investigational agitation drugs
