= Z8526711350 =

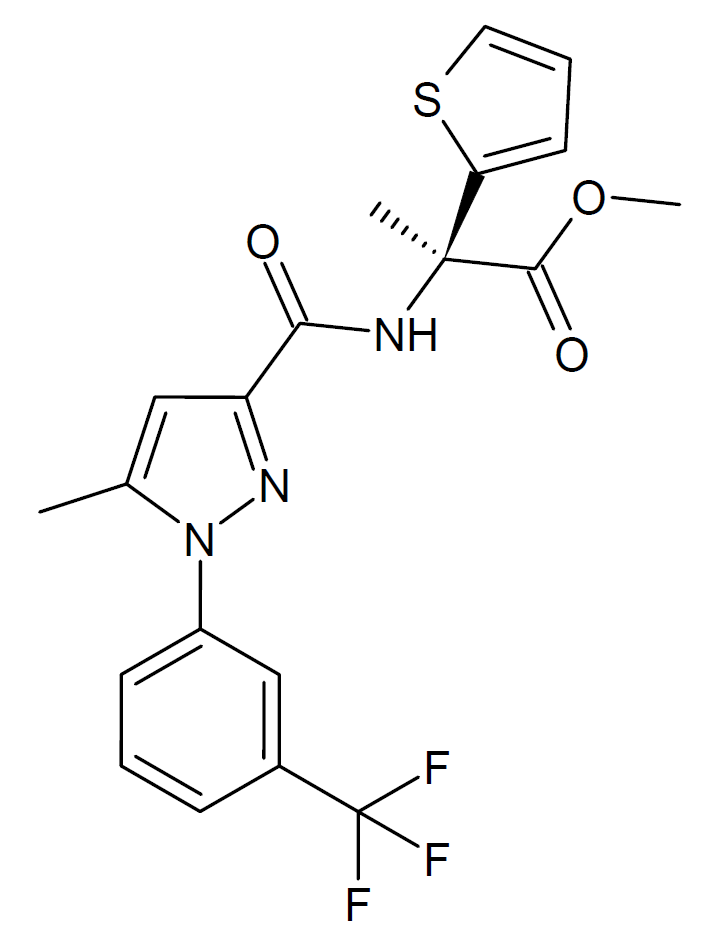

Legal status
- Legal status: UK: Under Psychoactive Substances Act

Identifiers
- IUPAC name: Methyl (2R)-2-[[5-methyl-1-[3-(trifluoromethyl)phenyl]pyrazole-3-carbonyl]amino]-2-thiophen-2-ylpropanoate
- PubChem CID: 170838490
- ChemSpider: 133323955

Chemical and physical data
- Formula: C_{20}H_{18}F_{3}N_{3}O_{3}S
- Molar mass: 437.44 g·mol^{−1}
- 3D model (JSmol): Interactive image
- SMILES: CC1=CC(=NN1C2=CC=CC(=C2)C(F)(F)F)C(=O)N[C@@](C)(C3=CC=CS3)C(=O)OC
- InChI: InChI=1S/C20H18F3N3O3S/c1-12-10-15(25-26(12)14-7-4-6-13(11-14)20(21,22)23)17(27)24-19(2,18(28)29-3)16-8-5-9-30-16/h4-11H,1-3H3,(H,24,27)/t19-/m0/s1; Key:XCJKFSDARVULKK-IBGZPJMESA-N

Z8526711350 (also known as '1350 or YVF) is a synthetic cannabinoid from the pyrazolecarboxamide family. It was developed using an ultra-large-scale docking approach to screen a library of 12 billion molecules and then dock 74 million of these against an in silico model of the CB_{1} receptor, of which the most promising 60 hits were prioritised for synthesis. 46 molecules were successfully made, of which 9 proved to show significant affinity to CB_{1} and two of these were found to be active as CB_{1} agonists with suitable solubility properties for further testing. Of these, ZINC537551486 was found to have a binding affinity of 731 nM at CB_{1} and was selected for further synthetic elaboration. After two rounds of synthetic modification for increased potency, the active enantiomer Z8526711350 was found to have a CB_{1} affinity of 0.95 nM, which made it stronger than the reference agonist CP 55,940 used for the docking studies. Z8526711350 was found to be a potent analgesic in animal models and also showed efficacy against allodynia caused by nerve damage, suggesting potential applications for the treatment of neuropathic pain. However, it is also believed to show functional selectivity as it showed reduced levels of sedation and of other animal surrogates of psychoactive effects.

== See also ==
- 5F-AB-FUPPYCA
- Tedalinab
- Z3517967757
- Z0443438219
