= 25N-NBPh =

Chemical compound

Clinical data
- Other names: NBPh-2C-N

Identifiers
- IUPAC name: N-[(2-phenyl)benzyl]-1-(2,5-dimethoxy-4-nitrophenyl)-2-aminoethane
- CAS Number: 2865185-29-9
- PubChem CID: 175819744

Chemical and physical data
- Formula: C_{23}H_{24}N_{2}O_{4}
- Molar mass: 392.455 g·mol^{−1}
- 3D model (JSmol): Interactive image
- SMILES: COc1cc(CCNCc2ccccc2c2ccccc2)c(cc1[N+]([O-])=O)OC
- InChI: InChI=1S/C23H24N2O4/c1-28-22-15-21(25(26)27)23(29-2)14-18(22)12-13-24-16-19-10-6-7-11-20(19)17-8-4-3-5-9-17/h3-11,14-15,24H,12-13,16H2,1-2H3; Key:LXUVMUYFLPADGJ-UHFFFAOYSA-N

25N-NBPh (NBPh-2C-N) is a phenethylamine derivative from the 25-NB class, which acts as a potent agonist at the 5-HT_{2A} receptor with weaker activity at 5-HT_{2B} and 5-HT_{2C}. 25N-NBPh is a biased agonist, producing robust activation of 5-HT_{2A} coupled signalling pathways mediated by beta arrestin 2, but with only slight activation of pathways mediated via G_{q}. In animal studies it produces a modest head-twitch response when administered by itself, but blocks the effects of the fully active psychedelic DOI.

== See also ==
- 25-NB
- Non-hallucinogenic 5-HT_{2A} receptor agonist
- 25N-NBOMe (NBOMe-2C-N)
- 25N-N1-Nap
- RS130-180
