= 25N-N1-Nap =

Chemical compound

Clinical data
- Other names: 25N-NM1Nap

Identifiers
- IUPAC name: N-[(naphthalen-1-yl)methyl]-1-(2,5-dimethoxy-4-nitrophenyl)-2-aminoethane
- CAS Number: 2865185-31-3
- PubChem CID: 170453317

Chemical and physical data
- Formula: C_{21}H_{22}N_{2}O_{4}
- Molar mass: 366.417 g·mol^{−1}
- 3D model (JSmol): Interactive image
- SMILES: COc1cc(CCNCc2cccc3ccccc32)c(cc1[N+]([O-])=O)OC
- InChI: InChI=1S/C21H22N2O4/c1-26-20-13-19(23(24)25)21(27-2)12-16(20)10-11-22-14-17-8-5-7-15-6-3-4-9-18(15)17/h3-9,12-13,22H,10-11,14H2,1-2H3; Key:ALVHBRTUOXXMDK-UHFFFAOYSA-N

25N-N1-Nap is a phenethylamine derivative from the 25-NB class, which acts as a potent agonist at the 5-HT_{2A} receptor with weaker activity at 5-HT_{2B} and 5-HT_{2C}. 25N-N1-Nap is a biased agonist, producing robust activation of 5-HT_{2A} coupled signaling pathways mediated by beta arrestin 2, but with little or no activation of pathways mediated via G_{q}. In animal studies it produces antipsychotic-like effects but without producing the head-twitch response associated with psychedelic activity.

== See also ==
- 25-NB
- Non-hallucinogenic 5-HT_{2A} receptor agonist
- 25N-NBOMe (NBOMe-2C-N)
- 25N-NBPh
- RS130-180
