= IHCH-8110 =

Clinical data
- Other names: IHCH8110
- Drug class: Peripherally selective and non-hallucinogenic serotonin 5-HT_{2A} receptor agonist; Serotonin 5-HT_{2B} receptor antagonist; Serotonin 5-HT_{2C} receptor agonist
- ATC code: None

Identifiers
- IUPAC name: N-methyl-N-(trans-4-aminocyclohexyl)-N'-(4-n-hexyloxybenzyl)urea

Chemical and physical data
- Formula: C_{21}H_{35}N_{3}O_{2}
- Molar mass: 361.530 g·mol^{−1}
- 3D model (JSmol): Interactive image
- SMILES: CCCCCCOC1=CC=C(CNC(N([C@@H]2CC[C@@H](N)CC2)C)=O)C=C1
- InChI: InChI=1S/C21H35N3O2/c1-3-4-5-6-15-26-20-13-7-17(8-14-20)16-23-21(25)24(2)19-11-9-18(22)10-12-19/h7-8,13-14,18-19H,3-6,9-12,15-16,22H2,1-2H3,(H,23,25)/t18-,19-; Key:BZQLUNPSADKUSQ-WGSAOQKQSA-N

IHCH-8110 is a peripherally selective and non-hallucinogenic serotonin 5-HT_{2A} receptor agonist.

== Pharmacology ==
IHCH-8110 shows affinity for the serotonin 5-HT_{2A}, 5-HT_{2B}, and 5-HT_{2C} receptors (K_{i} = 48 nM, 102 nM, and 302 nM, respectively). The drug is a partial agonist at the serotonin 5-HT_{2A} receptor with an EC_{50} of 93–479 nM and E_{max} of 45–68%. It is also a partial agonist of the serotonin 5-HT_{2C} receptor but not of the serotonin 5-HT_{2B} receptor, where it instead functioned as an antagonist. The drug did not interact with other serotonin or dopamine receptors.

IHCH-8110 is highly peripherally selective and does not produce the head-twitch response, a behavioral proxy of psychedelic effects, nor affect locomotor activity in rodents. It has been found to enhance CD8^{+} T cell-mediated antitumor immunity and inflammation and to suppress colorectal cancer progression, effects mediated by activation of serotonin 5-HT_{2A} receptors on enteric glial cells that results in increased CXCL10 and interleukin-18 expression.

== Chemistry ==
The chemical synthesis of IHCH-8110 has been described.

== History ==
IHCH-8110 was first described in the scientific literature by YaTing Wen and colleagues in 2026. It was developed following observations of the psychedelic drug LSD having similar colonic effects. There is interest in IHCH-8110 for potential medical use in colorectal cancer immunotherapy.

== See also ==
- IHCH-6122
- Serotonin 5-HT_{2A} receptor agonist
- List of miscellaneous 5-HT_{2A} receptor agonists
