= (R)-69 =

Chemical compound

Clinical data
- Other names: R-69; 3IQ
- Drug class: Non-hallucinogenic Serotonin 5-HT_{2A} receptor agonist

Identifiers
- IUPAC name: 3-[(5R)-5-methyl-1,2,5,6-tetrahydropyridin-3-yl]-1H-pyrrolo[2,3-b]pyridine
- CAS Number: 2765652-48-8
- PubChem CID: 164513426
- ChemSpider: 129875387
- UNII: L3MT297ZZJ
- ChEMBL: ChEMBL5399968
- PDB ligand: 3IQ (PDBe, RCSB PDB)

Chemical and physical data
- Formula: C_{13}H_{15}N_{3}
- Molar mass: 213.284 g·mol^{−1}
- 3D model (JSmol): Interactive image
- SMILES: C[C@@H]1C=C(CNC1)c1c[NH]c2ncccc12
- InChI: InChI=1S/C13H15N3/c1-9-5-10(7-14-6-9)12-8-16-13-11(12)3-2-4-15-13/h2-5,8-9,14H,6-7H2,1H3,(H,15,16)/t9-/m1/s1; Key:HNDPIXZRQWKEFZ-SECBINFHSA-N

(R)-69 (3IQ) is a drug of the tetrahydropyridinylpyrrolopyridine family related to the psychedelic tryptamines which acts as a 5-HT_{2A} receptor agonist, with 4.6-fold selectivity over 5-HT_{2B} and 49-fold selectivity over 5-HT_{2C}. It has a 5-HT_{2A} K_{i} of 680 nM and an EC_{50} of 41 nM. (R)-69 is a biased agonist selective for activation of the G_{q} coupled signalling pathway, with much weaker activation of the β-arrestin 2 coupled pathway. In animal studies it produces antidepressant-like activity but without producing the head-twitch response associated with psychedelic effects. The drug was identified along with its close analogue (R)-70 via an ultra-large-scale docking campaign against the serotonin 5-HT_{2A} receptor and was first described by Bryan L. Roth and colleagues in 2022. A number of related derivatives have also been developed.

== See also ==
- Tetrahydropyridinylpyrrolopyridine
- Substituted tryptamine § Related compounds
- Cyclized tryptamine
- List of miscellaneous 5-HT_{2A} receptor agonists
- Non-hallucinogenic 5-HT_{2A} receptor agonist
- RU-24969
- RU-28253
- NEtPhOH-THPI
- SN-22
- VU6067416
- Z3517967757
- (R)-70
