= CP-94253 =

Potent and selective serotonin 5-HT1B receptor agonist

Clinical data
- Other names: CP94253; CP-94,253
- Drug class: Serotonin 5-HT_{1B} receptor agonist

Identifiers
- IUPAC name: 3-(1,2,5,6-tetrahydro-4-pyridyl)-5-propoxypyrrolo[3,2-b]pyridine
- CAS Number: 131084-35-0
- PubChem CID: 4029677
- IUPHAR/BPS: 3221
- ChemSpider: 3246572
- UNII: FYC6YY5RYL
- CompTox Dashboard (EPA): DTXSID10470073

Chemical and physical data
- Formula: C_{15}H_{19}N_{3}O
- Molar mass: 257.337 g·mol^{−1}
- 3D model (JSmol): Interactive image
- SMILES: c13nc(OCCC)ccc1[nH]cc3C2=CCNCC2
- InChI: InChI=1S/C15H19N3O/c1-2-9-19-14-4-3-13-15(18-14)12(10-17-13)11-5-7-16-8-6-11/h3-5,10,16-17H,2,6-9H2,1H3; Key:KWQWBZIGHIOKIO-UHFFFAOYSA-N

CP-94253 is a drug of the tetrahydropyridinylpyrrolopyridine family which acts as a potent and selective serotonin 5-HT_{1B} receptor agonist, with approximately 25- and 40-fold selectivity over the closely related serotonin 5-HT_{1D} and 5-HT_{1A} receptors.

It has a range of behavioral effects, based on animal testing. The effects include the following: promoting wakefulness by increasing dopamine release in the brain; reducing food intake and promoting satiety; enhancing the reinforcing effects of cocaine; and possible antidepressant effects. In addition, CP-94253 reduces aggression without causing sedation in rodents.

A 2021 study found that "Regardless of sex, CP94253 decreased cocaine intake after abstinence and during resumption of SA [self-administration] and decreased cue reactivity" suggesting that agonism of the inhibitory 5-HT2B receptors may diminish the cognitive reward of cocaine usage and increased use of the drug without a period of abstinence may be a product of test subjects trying to achieve a previously rewarding experience through larger dosages of cocaine.

== See also ==
- Serotonin 5-HT_{1B} receptor agonist
- Tetrahydropyridinylpyrrolopyridine
- Substituted tryptamine § Related compounds
- Cyclized tryptamine
