= WAY-470 =

Chemical compound

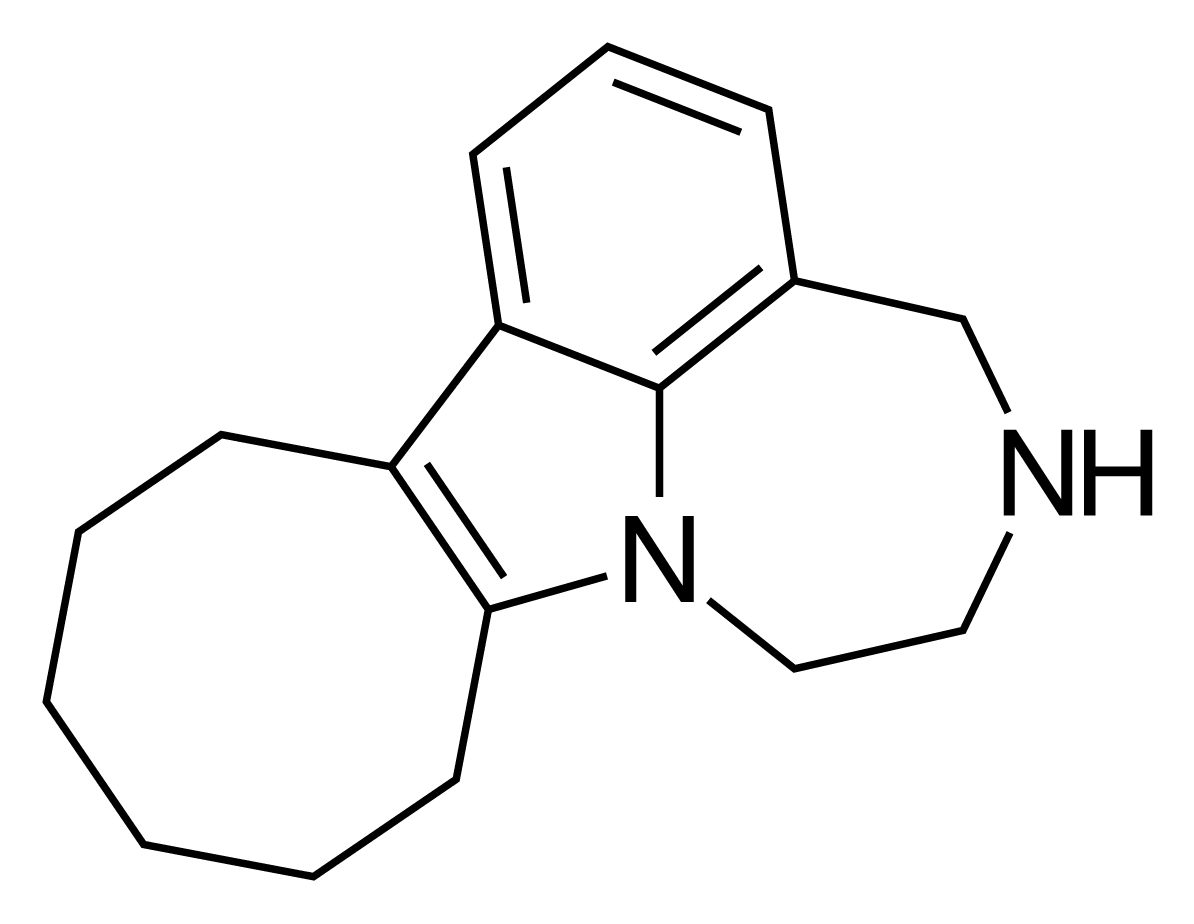

Identifiers
- IUPAC name: 1,16-diazatetracyclo[8.8.1.0^{2,9}.0^{14,19}]nonadeca-2(9),10,12,14(19)-tetraene
- CAS Number: 422318-22-7
- PubChem CID: 10037962
- ChemSpider: 8213527
- ChEMBL: ChEMBL89738

Chemical and physical data
- Formula: C_{17}H_{22}N_{2}
- Molar mass: 254.377 g·mol^{−1}
- 3D model (JSmol): Interactive image
- SMILES: C1CCCC2=C(CC1)C3=CC=CC4=C3N2CCNC4
- InChI: InChI=1S/C17H22N2/c1-2-4-9-16-14(7-3-1)15-8-5-6-13-12-18-10-11-19(16)17(13)15/h5-6,8,18H,1-4,7,9-12H2; Key:FEOKYCHGJRHIDE-UHFFFAOYSA-N

WAY-470 is a drug which acts as an agonist at 5-HT_{2A} and 5-HT_{2C} receptors though with lower affinity at 5-HT_{2B}. It has similar binding affinity to 5-HT_{2A} and 5-HT_{2C} but shows functional selectivity for 5-HT_{2C}.

== See also ==
- Lorcaserin
- PHA-57378
- SCHEMBL5334361
- WAY-163909
- WAY-261240
