= 25N-NBOMe =

Clinical data
- Other names: 2C-N-NBOMe; NBOMe-2C-N
- Drug class: Serotonin 5-HT_{2A} receptor agonist; Serotonergic psychedelic; Hallucinogen
- ATC code: None

Legal status
- Legal status: BR: Class F2 (Prohibited psychotropics); UK: Class A

Identifiers
- IUPAC name: 2-(2,5-dimethoxy-4-nitrophenyl)-N-[(2-methoxyphenyl)methyl]ethan-1-amine
- CAS Number: 1354632-03-3
- PubChem CID: 118536028
- ChemSpider: 52085577
- UNII: 0G7SSW2N0S
- CompTox Dashboard (EPA): DTXSID501014186

Chemical and physical data
- Formula: C_{18}H_{22}N_{2}O_{5}
- Molar mass: 346.383 g·mol^{−1}
- 3D model (JSmol): Interactive image
- SMILES: COC1=C(CCNCC2=C(OC)C=CC=C2)C=C(OC)C([N+]([O-])=O)=C1
- InChI: InChI=1S/C18H22N2O5/c1-23-16-7-5-4-6-14(16)12-19-9-8-13-10-18(25-3)15(20(21)22)11-17(13)24-2/h4-7,10-11,19H,8-9,12H2,1-3H3; Key:TXCKTIBHURMASQ-UHFFFAOYSA-N

25N-NBOMe, also known as 2C-N-NBOMe or NBOMe-2C-N, is a derivative of the hallucinogen 2C-N. The pharmacological properties of 25N-NBOMe have not been described in the scientific literature, but it is believed to act in a similar manner to related compounds such as 25I-NBOMe and 25C-NBOMe, which are potent agonists at the 5HT_{2A} receptor. 25N-NBOMe has been sold as a street drug and has only been described in the literature in terms of identification by forensic analysis.

== Use and effects ==
The dose range of 25N-NBOMe has been given as 0.1 to 1.3 mg or more sublingually, with a typical dose estimate of 0.6 mg. Whereas 2C-N is much less potent in terms of dose than other 2C drugs, 25N-NBOMe appears to have a similar dose range as other NBOMe drugs.

== Toxicity and harm potential ==
NBOMe compounds are often associated with life-threatening toxicity and death. Studies on NBOMe family of compounds demonstrated that the substances exhibit neurotoxic and cardiotoxic activity. Reports of autonomic dysfunction remains prevalent with NBOMe compounds, with most individuals experiencing sympathomimetic toxicity such as vasoconstriction, hypertension and tachycardia in addition to hallucinations. Other symptoms of toxidrome include agitation or aggression, seizure, hyperthermia, diaphoresis, hypertonia, rhabdomyolysis, and death. Researchers report that NBOMe intoxication frequently display signs of serotonin syndrome. The likelihood of seizure is higher in NBOMes compared to other psychedelics.

NBOMe and NBOHs are regularly sold as LSD in blotter papers, which have a bitter taste and different safety profiles. Despite high potency, recreational doses of LSD have only produced low incidents of acute toxicity. Fatalities involved in NBOMe intoxication suggest that a significant number of individuals ingested the substance which they believed was LSD, and researchers report that "users familiar with LSD may have a false sense of security when ingesting NBOMe inadvertently". While most fatalities are due to the physical effects of the drug, there have also been reports of death due to self-harm and suicide under the influence of the substance.

Given limited documentation of NBOMe consumption, the long-term effects of the substance remain unknown. NBOMe compounds are not active orally, (Note: The potency of N-benzylphenethylamines via buccal, sublingual, or nasal absorption is 50- to 100-fold greater (by weight) than oral route compared to the parent 2C-x compounds. Researchers hypothesize the low oral metabolic stability of N-benzylphenethylamines is likely causing the low bioavailability on the oral route, although the metabolic profile of this compounds remains unpredictable; therefore researchers state that the fatalities linked to these substances may partly be explained by differences in the metabolism between individuals.) and are usually taken sublingually. When NBOMes are administered sublingually, numbness of the tongue and mouth followed by a metallic chemical taste was observed, and researchers describe this physical side effect as one of the main discriminants between NBOMe compounds and LSD.

=== Neurotoxic and cardiotoxic actions ===
Many of the NBOMe compounds have high potency agonist activity at additional 5-HT receptors and prolonged activation of 5-HT_{2B} can cause cardiac valvulopathy in high doses and chronic use. 5-HT_{2B} receptors have been strongly implicated in causing drug-induced valvular heart disease. The high affinity of NBOMe compounds for adrenergic α_{1} receptor has been reported to contribute to the stimulant-type cardiovascular effects.

In vitro studies, 25C-NBOMe has been shown to exhibit cytotoxicity on neuronal cell lines SH-SY5Y, PC12, and SN471, and the compound was more potent than methamphetamine at reducing the visibility of the respective cells; the neurotoxicity of the compound involves activation of MAPK/ERK cascade and inhibition of Akt/PKB signaling pathway. 25C-NBOMe, including the other derivative 25D-NBOMe, reduced the visibility of cardiomyocytes H9c2 cells, and both substances downregulated expression level of p21 (CDC24/RAC)-activated kinase 1 (PAK1), an enzyme with documented cardiac protective effects.

Preliminary studies on 25C-NBOMe have shown that the substance is toxic to development, heart health, and brain health in zebrafish, rats, and Artemia salina, a common organism for studying potential drug effects on humans, but more research is needed on the topic, the doses, and if the toxicology results apply to humans. Researchers of the study also recommended further investigation of the drug's potential in damaging pregnant women and their fetus due to the substance's damaging effects to development.

=== Emergency treatment ===
At present, there are no specific antidotes for NBOMes, and all acute intoxication is managed by symptomatic treatments, such as administration of benzodiazepines, antipsychotic drugs, and antiarrhythmic agents, such as beta blockers; some emergency interventions are intended to specifically treat rhabdomyolysis, which may lead to critical complications such as metabolic acidosis and acute kidney injury.

== Pharmacology ==
=== Pharmacodynamics ===
25N-NBOMe activities
Target	Affinity (K_{i}, nM)
5-HT_{1A}	1,860–4,200 (K_{i}); 4,800 (EC_{50}); 36% (E_{max})
5-HT_{1B}	>10,000
5-HT_{1D}	5,620
5-HT_{1E}	>10,000
5-HT_{1F}	ND
5-HT_{2A}	0.11–1.41 (K_{i}); 0.204–70 (EC_{50}); 34–173% (E_{max})
5-HT_{2B}	4.47–8.7 (K_{i}); 2.34–70 (EC_{50}) <10–58% (E_{max})
5-HT_{2C}	1.06–21 (K_{i}); 0.457–1.32 (EC_{50}); 99–102% (E_{max})
5-HT_{3}	>10,000
5-HT_{4}	ND
5-HT_{5A}	>10,000
5-HT_{6}	55
5-HT_{7}	>10,000
α_{1A}	850–>10,000
α_{1B}, α_{1D}	>10,000
α_{2A}	501–590
α_{2B}	1,100
α_{2C}	692
β_{1}	>10,000
β_{1}	7,080
β_{3}	>10,000
D_{1}	18,000
D_{2}	2,400–6,760
D_{3}	2,190–4,500
D_{4}	>10,000
D_{5}	>10,000
H_{1}	91–210
H_{2}	1,070
H_{3}, H_{4}	>10,000
M_{1}–M_{5}	>10,000
I_{1}	ND
σ_{1}	537
σ_{2}	58
MOR	>10,000
DOR	>10,000
KOR	2,820
TAAR1	>20,000 (K_{i}) (mouse); 2,200 (K_{i}) (rat) >30,000 (EC_{50}) (mouse); 1,500 (EC_{50}) (rat) >10,000 (EC_{50}) (human); IA (E_{max}) (mouse); 34% (E_{max}) (rat)
SERT	1,410–5,810 (K_{i}); 5,790–20,000 (IC_{50}); IA (EC_{50})
NET	7,200–11,300 (K_{i}); 15,000–33,000 (IC_{50}); IA (EC_{50})
DAT	13,000–37,900 (K_{i}); 245,000 (IC_{50}); IA (EC_{50})
Notes: The smaller the value, the more avidly the drug binds to the site. All proteins are human unless otherwise specified. Refs:

25N-NBOMe is a selective and highly potent agonist of the serotonin 5-HT_{2} receptors. Its affinities (K_{i}) are 0.144 nM at the serotonin 5-HT_{2A} receptor, 8.7 nM at the serotonin 5-HT_{2B} receptor, and 1.06 nM at the serotonin 5-HT_{2C} receptor. In terms of affinity, the drug has approximately 7.4-fold selectivity for the serotonin 5-HT_{2A} receptor over the serotonin 5-HT_{2C} receptor and 60-fold selectivity for the 5-HT_{2A} receptor over the serotonin 5-HT_{2B} receptor.

The EC_{50} (E_{max}) values of 25N-NBOMe are 0.51 nM (87.9%) at the serotonin 5-HT_{2A} receptor, 47 nM (57.6%) at the serotonin 5-HT_{2B} receptor, and 1.32 nM (99.4%) at the serotonin 5-HT_{2C} receptor. Hence, 25N-NBOMe is a full agonist of the serotonin 5-HT_{2A} and 5-HT_{2C} receptors and a partial agonist of the serotonin 5-HT_{2B} receptor. In terms of functional activity, 25N-NBOMe had 2.6-fold selectivity for the serotonin 5-HT_{2A} receptor over the serotonin 5-HT_{2C} receptor and 92-fold selectivity for the serotonin 5-HT_{2A} receptor over the serotonin 5-HT_{2C} receptor.

In a 2023 study, the pharmacological properties of 25N-NBOMe (also referred to as compound 4) were extensively characterized using both in vitro and in vivo models. Radioligand binding assays showed high binding affinity for serotonin 5-HT_{2} receptors, with pK_{i} values of 9.26 ± 0.15 at 5-HT_{2A}, 8.35 ± 0.08 at 5-HT_{2B}, and 8.16 ± 0.07 at 5-HT_{2C}. The compound was also screened across more than 40 additional CNS targets and found to be highly selective for the 5-HT_{2} receptor subfamily.

In calcium flux functional assays, 25N-NBOMe was a potent full agonist at 5-HT_{2A} (pEC_{50} = 9.50 ± 0.03; E_{max} = 94 ± 1%) and 5-HT_{2C} (pEC_{50} = 9.07 ± 0.03; E_{max} = 102 ± 1%) receptors, while showing negligible agonist activity at 5-HT_{2B} (E_{max} < 10%).

Bioluminescence resonance energy transfer (BRET) functional assays measuring Gq dissociation and β-arrestin2 recruitment signaling indicated strong agonist activity at 5-HT_{2A}, with Gq pEC_{50} = 9.69 ± 0.04 (E_{max} = 95.2 ± 1.2%) and β-arrestin2 recruitment pEC_{50} = 9.66 ± 0.09 (E_{max} = 136.5 ± 3.6%). This illustrates that 25N-NBOMe is a balanced 5-HT_{2A} agonist across these pathways, in contrast to analogs like 25N-N1-Nap and 25N-NBPh which displayed functional selectivity or signaling bias for β-arrestin2 recruitment. For 5-HT_{2C}, Gq pEC_{50} was 9.34 ± 0.08 (E_{max} = 100.0 ± 2.5%), while weak partial agonist activity was observed at 5-HT_{2B} (pEC_{50} = 8.63 ± 0.14; E_{max} = 54.1 ± 2.5%).

In vivo, 25N-NBOMe induced a robust head-twitch response (HTR) in mice with an ED_{50} of 0.11 mg/kg (0.29 μmol/kg). Notably 25N-NBOMe produced the highest HTR frequency (4.890 counts per minute) among a panel of structurally related 25N analogs.

Unlike many other serotonergic psychedelics, 25N-NBOMe has shown reinforcing effects in rodents, including in terms of conditioned place preference (CPP) and self-administration. 25N-NBOMe has been found to increase phosphorylation of the dopamine transporter (DAT) in the striatum similarly to methamphetamine in rodents. DAT phosphorylation is associated with dopamine reverse transport and efflux, which in turn increases extracellular dopamine levels.

== History ==
25N-NBOMe was first described in the scientific literature by 2012.

== Society and culture ==
=== Legal status ===
==== Canada ====
25N-NBOMe is a controlled substance in Canada under phenethylamine blanket-ban language.

==== Hungary ====
25N-NBOMe is illegal in Hungary.

==== Sweden ====
The Riksdag added 25N-NBOMe to Narcotic Drugs Punishments Act under swedish schedule I ("substances, plant materials and fungi which normally do not have medical use") as of January 16, 2015, published by Medical Products Agency (MPA) in regulation LVFS 2014:11 listed as 25N-NBOMe, and 2-(2,5-dimetoxi-4-nitrofenyl)-N-(2-metoxibensyl)etanamin.

==== United Kingdom ====
This substance is a Class A drug in the United Kingdom as a result of the N-benzylphenethylamine catch-all clause in the Misuse of Drugs Act 1971.

==== United States ====
25N-NBOMe is not an explicitly controlled substance in the United States. However, it could be considered a controlled substance under the Federal Analogue Act if intended for human consumption.

25N-NBOMe is illegal in Alabama.

== See also ==
- 25-NB
- 25N-N1-Nap
- 25N-NBPh
