= IHCH-6122 =

Clinical data
- Other names: IHCH6122
- Drug class: Serotonin 5-HT_{2A} receptor agonist; Serotonin 5-HT_{2C} receptor agonist; Serotonin 5-HT_{2B} receptor antagonist
- ATC code: None

Identifiers
- IUPAC name: 3-piperazin-1-yl-5,6,7,8-tetrahydroisoquinoline
- PubChem CID: 176915195
- ChemSpider: 73044701

Chemical and physical data
- Formula: C_{13}H_{19}N_{3}
- Molar mass: 217.316 g·mol^{−1}
- 3D model (JSmol): Interactive image
- SMILES: C1CCC2=CN=C(C=C2C1)N3CCNCC3
- InChI: InChI=1S/C13H19N3/c1-2-4-12-10-15-13(9-11(12)3-1)16-7-5-14-6-8-16/h9-10,14H,1-8H2; Key:IPQHEOUVJXLYMR-UHFFFAOYSA-N

IHCH-6122 is a serotonergic drug of the arylpiperazine family, related to older compounds such as quipazine. It acts as an agonist at the 5-HT_{2A} and 5-HT_{2C} receptors but is an antagonist at 5-HT_{2B} receptors, a profile which is hoped to eliminate the issues with cardiac valvulopathies associated with related compounds that act as agonists of the 5-HT_{2B} receptor. In animal studies, IHCH-6122 produced a head-twitch response and antidepressant-like effects.

== See also ==
- Substituted piperazine
- IHCH-7113
- IHCH-8110
- VCU-1012
