= Tiflucarbine =

Clinical data
- Other names: BAY-P 4495; TVX P 4495
- Drug class: Serotonin receptor agonist
- ATC code: None

Identifiers
- IUPAC name: 9-Ethyl-4-fluoro-1-methyl-7,8,9,10-tetrahydro-6H-pyrido[4,3-b]thieno[3,2-e]indole
- CAS Number: 89875-86-5
- PubChem CID: 65677
- ChemSpider: 59106
- UNII: M2108NUY0C
- ChEMBL: ChEMBL2104715
- CompTox Dashboard (EPA): DTXSID90237924

Chemical and physical data
- Formula: C_{16}H_{17}FN_{2}S
- Molar mass: 288.38 g·mol^{−1}
- 3D model (JSmol): Interactive image
- SMILES: CCN1CCC2=C(C1)C3=C4C(=CSC4=C(C=C3N2)F)C
- InChI: InChI=1S/C16H17FN2S/c1-3-19-5-4-12-10(7-19)15-13(18-12)6-11(17)16-14(15)9(2)8-20-16/h6,8,18H,3-5,7H2,1-2H3; Key:BNKIWXODDDABSJ-UHFFFAOYSA-N

Tiflucarbine (BAY-P 4495 or TVX P 4495) is an experimental drug which acts as an agonist of the 5-HT_{1} and 5-HT_{2} serotonin receptor families, and also acts as a calmodulin inhibitor. It has antidepressant effects in animal studies. It produces the head-twitch response, a behavioral proxy of psychedelic effects, in rodents. In addition, it partially substituted for DOM and 8-OH-DPAT in rodent drug discrimination tests, with further generalization but concomitant substantial behavioral disruption in 5-MeO-DMT-trained rodents. Tiflucarbine is similar in structure to but distinct from β-carbolines, instead being a γ-carboline.

== See also ==
- List of miscellaneous serotonin 5-HT_{2A} receptor agonists
- Substituted γ-carboline
- 2MePI
