= Small nucleolar RNA Z152/R70/R12 =

Small nucleolar RNA Z152/R70/R12/
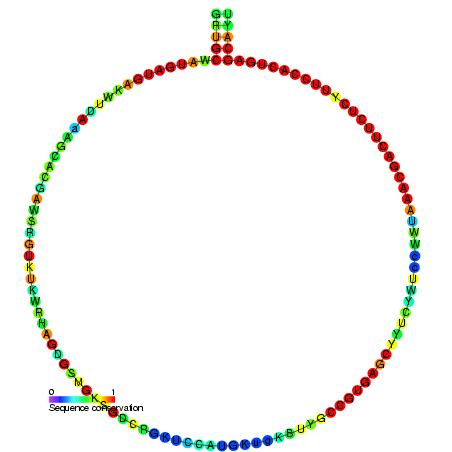
- Predicted secondary structure and sequence conservation of snoZ152

Identifiers
- Symbol: snoZ152
- Rfam: RF00350

Other data
- RNA type: Gene; snRNA; snoRNA; CD-box
- Domain: Eukaryota
- GO: GO:0006396 GO:0005730
- SO: SO:0000593
- PDB structures: PDBe

In molecular biology, Small nucleolar RNA Z152 (homologous to R70 and R12) is a non-coding RNA (ncRNA) molecule which functions in the modification of other small nuclear RNAs (snRNAs). This type of modifying RNA is usually located in the nucleolus of the eukaryotic cell which is a major site of snRNA biogenesis. It is known as a small nucleolar RNA (snoRNA) and also often referred to as a guide RNA. snoRNA Z152 belongs to the C/D box class of snoRNAs which contain the conserved sequence motifs known as the C box (UGAUGA) and the D box (CUGA). Most of the members of the box C/D family function in directing site-specific 2'-O-methylation of substrate RNAs. Plant snoRNA Z152 was identified in screens of Oryza sativa and Arabidopsis thaliana.
