= IHCH-7079 =

Chemical compound

Clinical data
- Drug class: Non-hallucinogenic serotonin 5-HT_{2A} receptor agonist

Identifiers
- IUPAC name: (6bR,10aS)-2,3,6b,7,8,9,10,10a-octahydro-8-[2-(2-methoxyphenyl)ethyl]-3-methyl-1H-Pyrido[3′,4′:4,5]pyrrolo[1,2,3-de]quinoxaline
- CAS Number: 2957888-63-8
- PubChem CID: 169488014
- ChemSpider: 129395458

Chemical and physical data
- Formula: C_{23}H_{29}N_{3}O
- Molar mass: 363.505 g·mol^{−1}
- 3D model (JSmol): Interactive image
- SMILES: CN(CCN1[C@]2([H])[C@@]3([H])CN(CCC4=CC=CC=C4OC)CC2)C5=C1C3=CC=C5
- InChI: InChI=1S/C23H29N3O/c1-24-14-15-26-20-11-13-25(12-10-17-6-3-4-9-22(17)27-2)16-19(20)18-7-5-8-21(24)23(18)26/h3-9,19-20H,10-16H2,1-2H3/t19-,20-/m0/s1; Key:FCGZRBNMPIAEDK-PMACEKPBSA-N

IHCH-7079 is a non-hallucinogenic serotonin 5-HT_{2A} receptor biased agonist of the pyridopyrroloquinoxaline family. It was derived via structural simplification of the serotonin 5-HT_{2A} receptor antagonist and atypical antipsychotic lumateperone. The drug produces antidepressant-like effects but not psychedelic-like effects in rodents. Other related compounds include IHCH-7086, which is a non-hallucinogenic serotonin 5-HT_{2A} receptor biased agonist similarly, and IHCH-7113, which produces the head-twitch response in rodents and hence would be expected to be hallucinogenic in humans.

== See also ==
- Pyridopyrroloquinoxaline
- Non-hallucinogenic 5-HT_{2A} receptor agonist
- Efavirenz
- IHCH-7086
- IHCH-7113
- ITI-333
- Mefloquine
- NDTDI
- RH-34
- SCHEMBL5334361
- WAY-163909
