= 2MePI =

Clinical data
- Drug class: Serotonin receptor modulator; Serotonin 5-HT_{2A} receptor weak partial agonist or functional antagonist
- ATC code: None

Identifiers
- IUPAC name: 2-methyl-1,3,4,5-tetrahydropyrido[4,3-b]indole
- CAS Number: 5094-12-2
- PubChem CID: 97424
- ChemSpider: 87935
- ChEMBL: ChEMBL1984135
- CompTox Dashboard (EPA): DTXSID30198969

Chemical and physical data
- Formula: C_{12}H_{14}N_{2}
- Molar mass: 186.258 g·mol^{−1}
- 3D model (JSmol): Interactive image
- SMILES: CN1CCC2=C(C1)C3=CC=CC=C3N2
- InChI: InChI=1S/C12H14N2/c1-14-7-6-12-10(8-14)9-4-2-3-5-11(9)13-12/h2-5,13H,6-8H2,1H3; Key:FYHWPFXPFFPQRT-UHFFFAOYSA-N

2MePI, also known as 2-methyl-2,3,4,5-tetrahydro-1H-pyrido[4,3-b]indole, is a serotonin receptor modulator of the pyridoindole (γ-carboline) family. It is the pyridoindole homologue of the ibogalog (azepinoindole) ibogaminalog (DM-506).

The drug acts as a weak partial agonist or functional competitive antagonist of the serotonin 5-HT_{2A} receptor, with an affinity (K_{i}) of 95 nM, an EC_{50} (E_{max}) of 533 nM (32%), an apparent IC_{50} of 3,100 to 18,000 nM, and a K_{B} of 89 to 228 nM. Compared to ibogaminalog, 2MePi had 5-fold lower affinity, 59-fold lower activational potency, and less than half the activational efficacy at the serotonin 5-HT_{2A} receptor. Results were analogous for 8MeO-2MePI against ibogainalog (8MeO-2MePI's ibogalog homologue). These findings indicate that ibogalogs are the more optimal structural scaffold for serotonin 5-HT_{2A} receptor agonism.

2MePI was first described in the scientific literature by Matthias Liechti and colleagues in 2026.

Chemical structures of 2MePI and related compounds
2MePI

8MeO-2MePI

Ibogaminalog

Ibogainalog

Tryptoline

== See also ==
- Substituted γ-carboline
- Pyridopyrroloquinoxaline § Related compounds
- Tiflucarbine
