= Ainuovirine =

Chemical compound

Clinical data
- Other names: ACC-007, KM-023, Aibangde, Einovirine

Identifiers
- IUPAC name: 3-(3-ethyl-2,6-dioxo-5-propan-2-ylpyrimidine-4-carbonyl)-5-methylbenzonitrile
- CAS Number: 1097628-00-6
- PubChem CID: 25215428
- ChemSpider: 24662280
- UNII: NMA4LK5WG9
- ChEMBL: ChEMBL1081658
- PDB ligand: KRV (PDBe, RCSB PDB)

Chemical and physical data
- Formula: C_{18}H_{19}N_{3}O_{3}
- Molar mass: 325.368 g·mol^{−1}
- 3D model (JSmol): Interactive image
- SMILES: CCN1C(=C(C(=O)NC1=O)C(C)C)C(=O)C2=CC(=CC(=C2)C#N)C
- InChI: InChI=InChI=1S/C18H19N3O3/c1-5-21-15(14(10(2)3)17(23)20-18(21)24)16(22)13-7-11(4)6-12(8-13)9-19/h6-8,10H,5H2,1-4H3,(H,20,23,24); Key:AYPIJAMXGVYYRQ-UHFFFAOYSA-N

Ainuovirine is a non-nucleoside reverse transcriptase inhibitor (NNRTI) being developed by Kainos Medicine for the treatment of HIV infections. Ainuovirine was approved in China in 2021 for the treatment of HIV-1 infection.
