= ITI-1549 =

Non-hallucinogenic 5-HT2A agonist

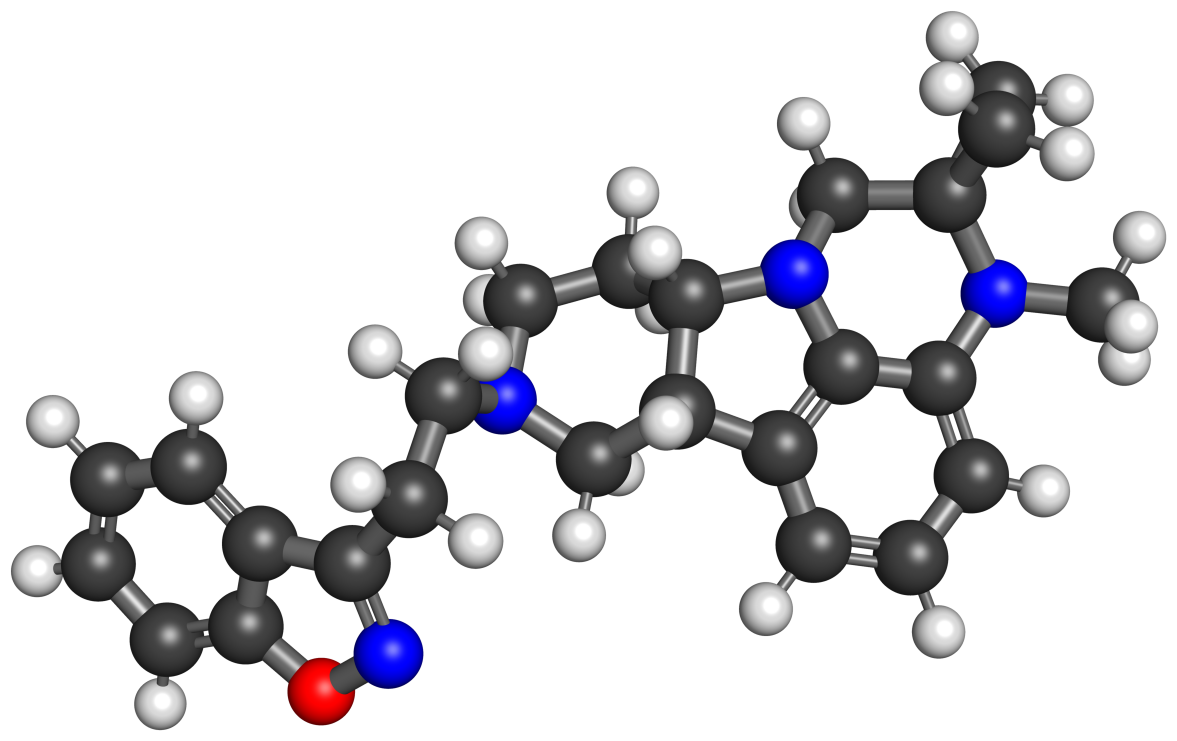

Clinical data
- Other names: ITI1549
- Routes of administration: Unspecified
- Drug class: Non-hallucinogenic serotonin 5-HT_{2A} receptor agonist

Identifiers
- IUPAC name: (6b'R,10a'S)-8'-[2-(1,2-benzoxazol-3-yl)ethyl]-2',3',6b',9',10',10a'-hexahydro-3'-methylspiro[cyclopropane-1,2'-[1H,7H]pyrido[3',4':4,5]pyrrolo[1,2,3-de]quinoxaline]

Chemical and physical data
- Formula: C_{25}H_{28}N_{4}O
- Molar mass: 400.526 g·mol^{−1}
- 3D model (JSmol): Interactive image
- SMILES: CN1c2cccc3c2N(CC12CC2)[C@H]1CCN(CCc2noc4ccccc24)C[C@@H]31
- InChI: InChI=1S/C25H28N4O/c1-27-22-7-4-6-17-19-15-28(13-9-20-18-5-2-3-8-23(18)30-26-20)14-10-21(19)29(24(17)22)16-25(27)11-12-25/h2-8,19,21H,9-16H2,1H3/t19-,21-/m0/s1; Key:CQNKASRHJXEWTD-FPOVZHCZSA-N

ITI-1549 is a putatively non-hallucinogenic serotonin 5-HT_{2A} receptor agonist of the pyridopyrroloquinoxaline family which is under development for the treatment of mood disorders and other psychiatric disorders. In addition to acting at the serotonin 5-HT_{2A} receptor, it is also an antagonist of the serotonin 5-HT_{2B} receptor and an agonist of the serotonin 5-HT_{2C} receptor. The drug's route of administration has not been specified.

== Pharmacology ==
=== Pharmacodynamics ===
Serotonergic psychedelics like psilocybin and lysergic acid diethylamide (LSD) are agonists of the serotonin 5-HT_{2A} receptor that activate both the β-arrestin and G_{q} signaling pathways. In 2023, activation of the G_{q} pathway, but not the β-arrestin pathway, was linked with the production of hallucinogenic-like effects, specifically the head-twitch response (HTR), in animals. Serotonin 5-HT_{2A} receptor agonists are of interest for the potential treatment of psychiatric disorders like depression and anxiety, but the hallucinogenic effects of serotonergic psychedelics serve as a barrier and partial limiting factor in this regard.

ITI-1549 has high affinity for the serotonin 5-HT_{2A} receptor (K_{i} = 10.2 nM) and acts as a partial agonist of the β-arrestin pathway with an intrinsic activity of 72% (relative to α-methylserotonin). Conversely, unlike serotonergic psychedelics, ITI-1549 does not activate the G_{q} pathway. Hence, it is a biased agonist of the serotonin 5-HT_{2A} receptor. In accordance with the preceding, ITI-1549 does not produce the HTR, a behavioral proxy of psychedelic effects, in animals. However, similarly to serotonergic psychedelics, ITI-1549 has been found to produce anxiolytic-like and prosocial effects in animals. Antidepressant-like and psychoplastogenic effects of ITI-1549 in animals have yet to be assessed or reported. In any case, various other non-hallucinogenic serotonin 5-HT_{2A} receptor agonists selective for the β-arrestin pathway have been found to produce antidepressant-like effects in animals.

In addition to the serotonin 5-HT_{2A} receptor, ITI-1549 has high affinity for the serotonin 5-HT_{2B} receptor (K_{i} = 4.8 nM). However, it acts as an antagonist of this receptor rather than as an agonist (IC_{50} = 13.8 nM). Based on these findings, continuous administration of ITI-1549 is not expected to pose a risk of cardiac valvulopathy. This is in contrast to many serotonergic psychedelics, which have been shown to act as potent serotonin 5-HT_{2B} receptor agonists. ITI-1549 is additionally a potent agonist of the serotonin 5-HT_{2C} receptor (K_{i} = 21 nM; EC_{50} = 40 nM).

== Chemistry ==
The chemical structure was disclosed in a 2024 patent. It is a pyridopyrroloquinoxaline derivative and is structurally related to the atypical antipsychotic lumateperone.

== History ==
ITI-1549 was first described in the scientific literature by 2023.

== Research ==
As of February 2024, ITI-1549 is in the preclinical research stage of development for treatment of psychiatric disorders. A phase 1 clinical trial is being planned and is expected to commence in late 2024 or early 2025. The drug is under development by Intra-Cellular Therapies.

== See also ==
- Pyridopyrroloquinoxaline
- List of investigational hallucinogens and entactogens
- List of miscellaneous 5-HT_{2A} receptor agonists
- Non-hallucinogenic 5-HT_{2A} receptor agonist
