= Z3517967757 =

Chemical compound

Clinical data
- Other names: Z7757, YEQ
- Drug class: Serotonin receptor modulator; Serotonin 5-HT_{2A} receptor agonist
- ATC code: None

Identifiers
- IUPAC name: 4-[1-(1-pyrimidin-2-ylethyl)piperidin-3-yl]phenol
- CAS Number: 2817502-85-3
- PubChem CID: 167949972
- ChemSpider: 132760262
- PDB ligand: YEQ (PDBe, RCSB PDB)

Chemical and physical data
- Formula: C_{17}H_{21}N_{3}O
- Molar mass: 283.375 g·mol^{−1}
- 3D model (JSmol): Interactive image
- SMILES: CC(C1=NC=CC=N1)N2CCCC(C2)C3=CC=C(C=C3)O
- InChI: InChI=1S/C17H21N3O/c1-13(17-18-9-3-10-19-17)20-11-2-4-15(12-20)14-5-7-16(21)8-6-14/h3,5-10,13,15,21H,2,4,11-12H2,1H3; Key:JDCMEPNJYDYSCB-UHFFFAOYSA-N

Z3517967757, or simply Z7757, is a 3-phenylpiperidine derivative which acts as an agonist at the 5-HT_{2} family of serotonin receptors, first reported in 2024. It can also be viewed as a ring-restrained phenethylamine. It has strongest activity at the 5-HT_{2A} receptor and lower affinity at the 5-HT_{2B} and 5-HT_{2C} receptors. However, it has been reported to have excellent selectivity for the 5-HT_{2A} receptor, with no agonistic activity at the 5-HT_{2B} and 5-HT_{2C} receptors. The drug was developed using in silico modelling to dock a large library of compounds against a 5-HT_{2A} receptor model generated by the artificial intelligence program AlphaFold, and then synthesised and tested in the laboratory to confirm activity. It has two stereogenic centers and four possible isomers, and was docked to the 5-HT_{2A} receptor as the (1R,3R) enantiomer YEQ.

Active enantiomer (YEQ)

== See also ==
- Substituted 3-phenylpiperidine
- IHCH-7079
- IHCH-7086
- IHCH-7113
- Zalsupindole
- (R)-69
- DMBMPP
- LPH-5
- Z8779877149
- List of miscellaneous 5-HT_{2A} receptor agonists
- Ultra-large-scale docking
