= SCHEMBL5334361 =

Drug

Identifiers
- IUPAC name: 7-[(3-methoxyphenoxy)methyl]-2,3,4,5-tetrahydro-1H-3-benzazepine
- CAS Number: 959867-47-1
- PubChem CID: 59027940

Chemical and physical data
- Formula: C_{18}H_{21}NO_{2}
- Molar mass: 283.371 g·mol^{−1}
- 3D model (JSmol): Interactive image
- SMILES: COC1=CC(=CC=C1)OCC2=CC3=C(CCNCC3)C=C2
- InChI: InChI=1S/C18H21NO2/c1-20-17-3-2-4-18(12-17)21-13-14-5-6-15-7-9-19-10-8-16(15)11-14/h2-6,11-12,19H,7-10,13H2,1H3; Key:BFCIUKMUJQOSDE-UHFFFAOYSA-N

SCHEMBL5334361 is a drug which acts as an agonist at the 5-HT_{2} family of serotonin receptors, and was developed for the treatment of glaucoma. It is a benzazepine derivative structurally related to the anorectic drug lorcaserin. It is selective for 5-HT_{2A}, with an EC_{50} of 0.4nM at 5-HT_{2A} vs 3.9nM at 5-HT_{2C} and a much lower affinity of 417nM at 5-HT_{2B}.

== See also ==
- Substituted 3-benzazepine
- 3C-BZ
- 4-PhPr-3,5-DMA
- AL-34662
- GSK-189254
- IHCH-7113
- O-4310
- WAY-470
- Zalsupindole
