= RH-34 =

Chemical compound

Clinical data
- Other names: EZS-8-NBOMe; NBOMe-EZS-8
- Routes of administration: ?
- ATC code: None

Legal status
- Legal status: BR: Class F2 (Prohibited psychotropics); In general: uncontrolled

Identifiers
- IUPAC name: 3-[2-(2-methoxybenzylamino)ethyl]-1H-quinazoline-2,4-dione
- CAS Number: 1028307-48-3
- PubChem CID: 10041987
- ChemSpider: 8217551
- UNII: A31AED225O
- CompTox Dashboard (EPA): DTXSID80434687

Chemical and physical data
- Formula: C_{18}H_{19}N_{3}O_{3}
- Molar mass: 325.368 g·mol^{−1}
- 3D model (JSmol): Interactive image
- SMILES: O=C1C=2C(NC(=O)N1CCNCC3=C(OC)C=CC=C3)=CC=CC2
- InChI: InChI=1S/C18H19N3O3/c1-24-16-9-5-2-6-13(16)12-19-10-11-21-17(22)14-7-3-4-8-15(14)20-18(21)23/h2-9,19H,10-12H2,1H3,(H,20,23); Key:NUAJBITWGGTZCM-UHFFFAOYSA-N

RH-34 is a compound which acts as a potent and selective partial agonist for the 5-HT_{2A} serotonin receptor subtype. It was derived by structural modification of the selective 5-HT_{2A} antagonist ketanserin, with the 4-(p-fluorobenzoyl)piperidine moiety replaced by the N-(2-methoxybenzyl) pharmacophore found in such potent 5-HT_{2A} agonists as NBOMe-2C-B and NBOMe-2C-I. This alteration was found to retain 5-HT_{2A} affinity and selectivity, but reversed activity from an antagonist to a moderate efficacy partial agonist.

== Chemistry ==
=== Analogues ===
Analogues of RH-34 with potent serotonin 5-HT_{2A} receptor agonist activity such as WL567 and WL568 have been described.

Chemical structures of RH-34 and analogues
RH-34

Ketanserin

EZS-8

WL567

WL568

== Society and culture ==
=== Legal status ===
RH-34 is a controlled substance in Hungary and Brazil. It is not a controlled substance in Canada as of 2025. It is also not an explicitly controlled substance in the United States.

== See also ==
- List of miscellaneous 5-HT2A receptor agonists
- EZS-8
- 5-MeO-NBpBrT
- IHCH-7113
- Ketanserin
- Efavirenz
