= WAY-163909 =

Chemical compound

Identifiers
- IUPAC name: (11R,15R)-7,10-diazatetracyclo[8.5.1.0^{5,16}.0^{11,15}]hexadeca-1,3,5(16)-triene
- CAS Number: 428868-32-0
- PubChem CID: 10130594
- ChemSpider: 8306109
- UNII: MN9LW8268N
- ChEMBL: ChEMBL1628670
- CompTox Dashboard (EPA): DTXSID40436021

Chemical and physical data
- Formula: C_{14}H_{18}N_{2}
- Molar mass: 214.312 g·mol^{−1}
- 3D model (JSmol): Interactive image
- SMILES: C1C[C@H]2[C@@H](C1)N3CCNCC4=C3C2=CC=C4
- InChI: InChI=1S/C14H18N2/c1-3-10-9-15-7-8-16-13-6-2-4-11(13)12(5-1)14(10)16/h1,3,5,11,13,15H,2,4,6-9H2/t11-,13-/m1/s1; Key:XOSKJKGKWRIMGV-DGCLKSJQSA-N

WAY-163,909 is a drug which acts as a potent and reasonably selective agonist for the serotonin 5-HT_{2C} receptor. It has antipsychotic-like effects in animal models, and has been used to study the role of the 5-HT_{2C} receptor subtype in the action of addictive drugs such as nicotine and methamphetamine.

== See also ==
- IHCH-7113
- Lorcaserin
- Ro60-0213
- Vabicaserin
- VER-3323
- WAY-470
- YM-348
