= Lumateperone =

Atypical antipsychotic

Clinical data
- Pronunciation: /ˌluːməˈtɛpəroʊn/ LOO-mə-TE-pər-ohn
- Trade names: Caplyta
- Other names: ITI-007; ITI-722
- AHFS/Drugs.com: Monograph
- MedlinePlus: a620014
- License data: US DailyMed: Lumateperone
- Routes of administration: By mouth
- Drug class: Atypical antipsychotic
- ATC code: N05AD10 (WHO)

Legal status
- Legal status: US: ℞-only

Pharmacokinetic data
- Bioavailability: 4.4%
- Protein binding: 97.4%
- Metabolism: Multiple UGTs, CYP450s, and AKR enzymes
- Excretion: <1% excreted unchanged in urine

Identifiers
- IUPAC name: 1-(4-fluorophenyl)-4-((6bR,10aS)-3-methyl-2,3,6b,9,10,10a-hexahydro-1H-pyrido[3',4':4,5]pyrrolo[1,2,3-de]quinoxalin-8(7H)-yl)-1-butanone
- CAS Number: 313368-91-1
- PubChem CID: 9821941
- DrugBank: DB06077
- ChemSpider: 7997690
- UNII: 70BSQ12069
- KEGG: D11169

Chemical and physical data
- Formula: C_{24}H_{28}FN_{3}O
- Molar mass: 393.506 g·mol^{−1}
- 3D model (JSmol): Interactive image
- SMILES: CN1CCN2c3c(cccc31)[C@@H]1CN(CCCC(=O)c3ccc(F)cc3)CC[C@@H]12
- InChI: InChI=1S/C24H28FN3O/c1-26-14-15-28-21-11-13-27(16-20(21)19-4-2-5-22(26)24(19)28)12-3-6-23(29)17-7-9-18(25)10-8-17/h2,4-5,7-10,20-21H,3,6,11-16H2,1H3/t20-,21-/m0/s1; Key:HOIIHACBCFLJET-SFTDATJTSA-N

Lumateperone, sold under the brand name Caplyta, is an atypical antipsychotic medication of the pyridopyrroloquinoxaline and butyrophenone families. It is approved for the treatment of schizophrenia as well as bipolar depression, as either monotherapy or adjunctive therapy (with lithium or valproate), and for major depressive disorder as an adjunctive therapy only (with an oral antidepressant). It is developed by Intra-Cellular Therapies, licensed from Bristol-Myers Squibb. Lumateperone was approved for medical use in the US in December 2019 with an initial indication for schizophrenia. It became available in February 2020.

== Medical uses ==
Lumateperone is indicated for the treatment of schizophrenia in adults; and depressive episodes associated with bipolar I or II disorder (bipolar depression) in adults, as monotherapy and as adjunctive therapy with lithium or valproate.

=== Schizophrenia ===
In December 2019, the US Food and Drug Administration (FDA) approved lumateperone for the treatment of schizophrenia in adults. Lumateperone is more effective than placebo for reducing positive symptoms after 4–6 weeks of treatment. Some clinical trials report that lumateperone may be effective for treating negative symptoms.

=== Bipolar depression ===
In December 2021, the FDA approved lumateperone for the treatment of bipolar depression in adults as monotherapy and as adjunctive therapy with lithium or valproate.

=== Major depressive disorder ===
In November 2025, the FDA approved lumateperone for the treatment of major depressive disorder in adults as an adjunctive therapy with an oral antidepressant.

== Adverse effects ==
The most common adverse effects (≥5%) were somnolence and dry mouth.

Lumateperone is associated with a low rate of serum aminotransferase elevations during therapy, but has not been linked to instances of clinically apparent acute liver injury.

== Pharmacology ==
Receptor affinities
Site	Action	K_{i} (nM)	Ref
SERT	Antagonist	62	
DAT	Antagonist	?	
5-HT_{2A}	Antagonist	0.54	
α_{1A}	ND	100-	
α_{1B}	ND	100-	
D_{1}	Agonist	52	
D_{2S}	Agonist (partial)	32?	
D_{2L}	Antagonist	32?	
D_{4}	ND	100-	

=== Mechanism of action ===
Lumateperone acts as an antagonist at 5-HT_{2A} receptors and binds to several dopamine receptors (D_{1}, D_{2}, and D_{4}) with moderate affinity. It has moderate serotonin transporter reuptake inhibition, which is partly responsible for its antidepressant effect in bipolar disorder and reduction of negative symptoms of schizophrenia. It may also inhibit dopamine transporter reuptake, but more evidence is needed to confirm this. It has additional off-target antagonism at α1 receptors, without appreciable antimuscarinic or antihistaminergic properties, limiting side effects associated with other atypical antipsychotics, notably metabolic syndrome and hyperprolactinemia.

Similar to aripiprazole, lumateperone acts as a partial agonist at inhibitory D2 autoreceptors and an antagonist at postsynaptic D2 receptors, thereby simultaneously reducing dopamine release and binding to postsynaptic receptors, respectively. However, lumateperone only occupies around 39% of D2 receptors—compared to at least 60-80% D2 occupancy for most antipsychotics to work for psychosis—and displays regioselectivity for the mesolimbic pathway, whose hyperactivity is responsible for the positive symptoms of schizophrenia. These qualities reduce the risk of extrapyramidal symptoms (EPS) from reduced dopaminergic transmission in the nigrostriatal pathway.

A mechanism that is shared by all other atypical antipsychotics is antagonism of 5HT2A receptors, but, uniquely, lumateperone's affinity for these receptors is 60x higher than its affinity for D2 receptors. This makes it a highly effective treatment for negative and cognitive symptoms of schizophrenia since 5HT2A antagonism increases dopamine release in the mesocortical pathway which is hypoactive in those with schizophrenia.

Interestingly, lumateperone indirectly augments glutamatergic neurotransmission through its activity at D1 receptors, which causes phosphorylation of GluN2B subunits of NMDA receptors in the mesolimbic pathway. This is significant since NMDA receptor hypofunction, reduced D1 binding, and glutamatergic abnormalities have been implicated in contributing to the cognitive and negative symptoms of schizophrenia.

It has also been identified as a potent vesicular monoamine transporter 2 (VMAT2) inhibitor (IC_{50} = 62 nM).

=== Pharmacokinetics ===
After taking the medication by mouth, lumateperone reaches maximum plasma concentrations within 1–2 hours and has a terminal elimination half-life of 18 hours. Lumateperone is a substrate for numerous metabolic enzymes, including various glucuronosyltransferase (UGT) isoforms (UGT1A1, 1A4, and 2B15), aldo-keto reductase (AKR) isoforms (AKR1C1, 1B10, and 1C4), and cytochrome P450 (CYP) enzymes (CYP3A4, 2C8, and 1A2).

Lumateperone does not cause appreciable inhibition of any common CYP450 enzymes. It is not a substrate for p-glycoprotein.

== Chemistry ==
In terms of chemical structure, lumateperone is a pyridopyrroloquinoxaline and butyrophenone.

=== Analogues ===
Pyridopyrroloquinoxaline serotonin 5-HT_{2A} receptor agonists such as the psychedelic IHCH-7113 and the non-hallucinogenic IHCH-7086, IHCH-7079, and ITI-1549 have been derived via structural modification of lumateperone.

== History ==
The FDA approved lumateperone in 2019 based on evidence from three clinical trials (Trial 1/NCT01499563, Trial 2/NCT02282761 and Trial 3/NCT02469155) that enrolled 818 adult participants with schizophrenia. The trials were conducted at 33 sites in the United States. Trials 1 and 2 provided data on the benefits and side effects of lumateperone, and Trial 3 provided data on side effects only.

Three trials provided data for the approval of lumateperone. In each trial, hospitalized participants with schizophrenia were randomly assigned to receive either lumateperone or a comparison treatment (placebo or active comparator) once daily for four weeks (Trials 1 and 2) or six weeks (Trial 3). Neither the participants nor the health care providers knew which treatment was being given until after the trials were completed.

Trials 1 and 2 provided data for the assessment of benefits and side effects through four weeks of therapy. Benefit was assessed by measuring the overall improvement in the symptoms of schizophrenia. Trial 3 provided data for the assessment of side effects only during six weeks of therapy.

Two Phase III lumateperone monotherapy studies were conducted and completed for the treatment of bipolar depression, those being trial Study 401 and Study 404. A third trial, Study 402, tested lumateperone as an adjunctive therapy to lithium or valproate in patients experiencing bipolar depression with an inadequate response to lithium or valproate alone. Study 402 patients saw an improvement of depressive symptoms compared to placebo as documented by a change in MADRS total score of 2.4.

Study 401 was conducted solely in the United States while Study 404 was a global study and included patients from the US. Of the entire Study 404 population (381 patients), two-thirds were from Russia and Colombia. At the completion of the two monotherapy Phase III trials only Study 404 met its primary endpoint and one of its secondary endpoints. In Study 404, patients received 42 mg lumateperone once daily or placebo for six weeks. Study 404 patients saw an improvement of depressive symptoms compared to placebo as documented by a change in MADRS total score of 4.6.
