= Ultra-large-scale docking =

Ultra-large-scale docking, sometimes abbreviated as Ultra-LSD, is an ultra-large-scale approach to protein–ligand docking and virtual screening. It employs molecular docking campaigns against libraries of millions or billions of chemical compounds to discover new drugs. The virtual screening phase identifies potential high-affinity ligands and then selected promising compounds are synthesized and further evaluated in the laboratory, including in terms of properties like functional activity and selectivity. The purpose of Ultra-LSD is to discover novel chemical scaffolds for ligands of molecular targets. Ultra-LSD was developed by Brian Shoichet and John Irwin at the University of California, San Francisco, Bryan L. Roth at University of North Carolina at Chapel Hill, and other colleagues, and was first described in 2019.

The researchers have conducted Ultra-LSD campaigns against a variety of targets, including the serotonin 5-HT_{2A} receptor, the melatonin receptors, the dopamine D_{4} receptor, and the serotonin 5-HT_{5A} receptor, among others. Some of these studies have notably employed AlphaFold2-generated models of folded receptor structures for molecular docking with ligands.

The aim of the serotonin 5-HT_{2A} receptor Ultra-LSD campaign was to identify novel serotonin 5-HT_{2A} receptor agonists, including non-hallucinogenic psychoplastogens for potential medical use as well as serotonergic psychedelics. In 2021, it was reported that the serotonin 5-HT_{2A} receptor Ultra-LSD campaign had computationally screened 11 billion compounds of a library of more than 34 billion compounds. It was hoped that the project would identify numerous new structural scaffolds of psychedelics. The first findings of the campaign were published in 2022. The project led to the identification of novel serotonin 5-HT_{2A} receptor agonists including the non-hallucinogenic G_{q}-biased agonists (R)-69 and (R)-70, the selective serotonin 5-HT_{2A} receptor agonist Z3517967757, and the β-arrestin-biased serotonin 5-HT_{2A} receptor agonist RS130-180, among others. The project received a US$27 million grant from the Defense Advanced Research Projects Agency (DARPA) to develop novel antidepressants. The serotonin 5-HT_{2A} receptor campaign was featured by Hamilton Morris in 2021 in the final episode of his TV show Hamilton's Pharmacopeia.

Ultra-LSD campaigns generally make use of the ZINC database, a free and publicly available curated library of billions of compounds for virtual screening that was developed by Irwin and Schoichet. ZINC was first made available in 2005 and has grown in size exponentially over time, from hundreds of thousands of compounds at launch to billions of compounds in 2022.
