= Bryan Roth =

American pharmacologist and academic

- Citizenship: USA
- Occupation: Professor
- Board member of: Executive Editor, Biochemistry
- Awards: Michael Hooker Distinguished Professor of Pharmacology (2006-); Goodman and Gilman Award for Receptor Pharmacology (2016); Member, National Academy of Medicine; Member, American Academy of Arts and Sciences

Academic background
- Education: Carroll College, BA (1977); St. Louis University Medical School, MD, PhD (1983)

Academic work
- Discipline: Molecular Pharmacology
- Institutions: University of North Carolina; Case Western Reserve University

Bryan L. Roth is the Michael Hooker Distinguished Professor of Protein Therapeutics and Translational Proteomics, UNC School of Medicine. He is recognized for his discoveries and inventions in the general areas of molecular pharmacology, GPCR structure, and function and synthetic neurobiology. He is a member of the American Academy of Arts and Sciences (AAAS) and the National Academy of Medicine (NAM).

== Education ==
Roth earned his B.A. in biology from Carroll College in 1977 and his M.D. and Ph.D. in biochemistry from Saint Louis University in 1983. After postdoctoral training at the National Institute of Mental Health (NIMH), he completed a psychiatry residency and fellowship at Stanford University in 1991. The same year, he was appointed Assistant Professor in the Department of Psychiatry at Case Western Reserve University. In 2003, he became a Professor of Biochemistry at Case Western Reserve University School of Medicine with secondary appointments in Psychiatry, Oncology, and Neurosciences. In 2007, he was appointed as the Michael Hooker Distinguished Professor of Protein Therapeutics and Translational Proteomics, UNC School of Medicine.

== Research ==
Roth has made contributions to the fields of G protein-coupled receptor (GPCR) pharmacology and neurobiology, particularly related to the function of serotonin and opioid receptors. His laboratory reported the structure of a serotonin receptor bound to the hallucinogenic drug, LSD. Other major works include identification of new probes and tools to detect GPCRs, obtained through directed evolution in animal cells, developing receptors activated solely by a synthetic ligand (DREADDs), a chemogenetic platform used to direct selective, dose-dependent activation of a specific G protein subtype in vivo. Thomas Insel, then Director of NIMH, stated in 2014 that DREADDs were one of the most important breakthrough technologies for the NIH BRAIN Initiative. and have been used by more than a thousand labs for interrogating neural circuits responsible for simple and complex behaviors in animals.

== Awards and recognition ==
Roth’s work has been recognized by Science Signaling as one of the ‘Signaling Breakthroughs of ‘2014’ and 2016. His DREADD technology was highlighted as one of the important advances in the past 10 years in Nature Chemical Biology. Roth’s chemical biology discoveries have been highlighted by NIMH as one of the ‘Top 10 Research Advances of 2011’. Roth is a member of the American Academy of Arts and Sciences (AAAS) and the National Academy of Medicine (NAM). He received the Goodman and Gilman Award in Receptor Pharmacology from the American Society for Pharmacology and Experimental Therapeutics and was a 2018 Society for Neuroscience Presidential Special Lecture.

== See also ==
- Ultra-large-scale docking
