= IHCH-7113 =

Chemical compound

Clinical data
- Other names: IHCH7113
- Drug class: Serotonin 5-HT_{2A} receptor agonist; Serotonergic psychedelic; Hallucinogen

Identifiers
- IUPAC name: (10R,15S)-4-methyl-1,4,12-triazatetracyclo[7.6.1.0^{5,16}.0^{10,15}]hexadeca-5,7,9(16)-triene
- CAS Number: 313368-85-3
- PubChem CID: 21302499
- ChemSpider: 113607216
- UNII: C5DN9QL3UY

Chemical and physical data
- Formula: C_{14}H_{19}N_{3}
- Molar mass: 229.327 g·mol^{−1}
- 3D model (JSmol): Interactive image
- SMILES: CN1CCN2[C@H]3CCNC[C@H]3C4=C2C1=CC=C4
- InChI: InChI=1S/C14H19N3/c1-16-7-8-17-12-5-6-15-9-11(12)10-3-2-4-13(16)14(10)17/h2-4,11-12,15H,5-9H2,1H3/t11-,12-/m0/s1; Key:QLGUCSLWLPCOTR-RYUDHWBXSA-N

IHCH-7113 is a serotonin 5-HT_{2A} receptor agonist and serotonergic psychedelic of the pyridopyrroloquinoxaline family. It was derived by structural simplification of the serotonin 5-HT_{2A} receptor antagonist and atypical antipsychotic lumateperone. Other related compounds include IHCH-7079 and IHCH-7086, which were found to be non-hallucinogenic biased serotonin 5-HT_{2A} receptor agonists that were active in antidepressant assays but did not produce psychedelic-like responding in mice. IHCH-7113 on the other hand produced a head-twitch response comparable to that of DOI or LSD, which was blocked by the serotonin 5-HT_{2A} receptor antagonist volinanserin. The drug is not a controlled substance in the United States or Canada.

== See also ==
- Pyridopyrroloquinoxaline
- Substituted γ-carboline
- WAY-163909
