= Serotonin 5-HT2A receptor agonist =

Drug class

Serotonin 5-HT_{2A} receptor agonist
- Drug class
- Psilocybin, a well-known psychedelic, is a prodrug of psilocin, a non-selective agonist of the serotonin 5-HT_{2A} receptor.

Class identifiers
- Synonyms: 5-HT_{2A} agonist
- Use: recreational drugs, treatment of intractable psychiatric disorders
- Mechanism of action: Serotonin 5-HT_{2A} receptor agonism
- Biological target: Serotonin 5-HT_{2A} receptor
- Chemical class: Tryptamines, phenethylamines, ergolines, lysergamides, others

Legal status

A serotonin 5-HT_{2A} receptor agonist, or simply 5-HT_{2A} agonist, is a drug which acts as an agonist of the serotonin 5-HT_{2A} receptor. The serotonin 5-HT_{2A} receptor is one of 13 known human serotonin receptors. Serotonin 5-HT_{2A} receptor agonists can be divided into two main groups: (1) serotonergic psychedelics such as LSD, psilocybin, and mescaline; and (2) non-hallucinogenic serotonin 5-HT_{2A} receptor agonists such as lisuride, Ariadne, tabernanthalog, and zalsupindole, among others. Psychedelic and non-hallucinogenic serotonin 5-HT_{2A} receptor agonists can be reliably distinguished from each other in scientific research using the head-twitch response assay in animals.

Agonists of the serotonin 5-HT_{2A} receptor are generally not selective for this receptor and also interact with other serotonin receptors, such as the serotonin 5-HT_{1A}, 5-HT_{2B}, and/or 5-HT_{2C} receptors, among others. However, highly selective serotonin 5-HT_{2A} receptor agonists, such as TGF-8027, have also been developed. In addition to degree of selectivity for the serotonin 5-HT_{2A} receptor, the serotonin 5-HT_{2A} receptor activates a variety of different downstream signaling pathways, such as G protein and β-arrestin cascades, and serotonin 5-HT_{2A} receptor agonists can have varying efficacies for activating these pathways, in turn resulting in different effects. Differing efficacies at different downstream signaling pathways relative to serotonin is also known as functional selectivity or biased agonism.

Serotonin 5-HT_{2A} receptor agonists are frequently analogues of the neurotransmitter serotonin, and include tryptamines, phenethylamines, and ergolines and lysergamides, among other chemical classes.

In addition to the recreational and entheogenic use of serotonergic psychedelics, both psychedelic and non-hallucinogenic serotonin 5-HT_{2A} receptor agonists, which act as psychoplastogens and have antidepressant-like effects in animals, may have applications in the treatment of psychiatric disorders such as depression, anxiety, and addiction. However, use of psychedelics for such purposes has also been critiqued and their potential adverse effects highlighted.

== Serotonergic psychedelics ==
Serotonergic psychedelics, also known as hallucinogenic serotonin 5-HT_{2A} receptor agonists, produce hallucinogenic effects including open-eye and closed-eye psychedelic visuals, other perceptual changes, synesthesia, distortions in time perception, ego loss, emotional changes, and mystical experiences, among others. Examples of serotonergic psychedelics include the following:

- Tryptamines like psilocybin, psilocin, dimethyltryptamine (DMT), and 5-MeO-DMT
- Phenethylamines like mescaline, 2C-B, DOM, 25I-NBOMe, and MDA
- Lysergamides like LSD and ergine (LSA)

It is thought that a certain minimum level of activational efficacy at the G_{q} pathway of the serotonin 5-HT_{2A} receptor may be required for psychedelic effects. However, more research is needed, and a role of other pathways, such as the β-arrestin pathway, has not been ruled out.

== Non-hallucinogenic 5-HT_{2A} receptor agonists ==
Non-hallucinogenic serotonin 5-HT_{2A} receptor agonists, which have sometimes been referred to as "non-hallucinogenic psychedelics", are a class of drugs which act as agonists of the serotonin 5-HT_{2A} receptor and produce effects mediated by this receptor such as neuroplastic and behavioral changes but do not produce psychedelic effects. This class of drugs includes the following compounds:

- Tryptamines like 6-fluoro-DET, 6-MeO-DMT, and AET
- Ibogalogs like tabernanthalog (TBG; DLX-007), ibogaminalog (DM-506), noribogainalog (nor-IBG), catharanthalog (CAG), and PNU-22394
- Isotryptamines like isoDMT, 5-MeO-isoDMT, 6-MeO-isoDMT, and zalsupindole (AAZ-A-154; DLX-001; 5-MeO-α-Me-isoDMT)
- Indolizinylethylamines like 2ZEDMA (TACT908)
- Tetrahydropyridinylpyrrolopyridines like (R)-69 and (R)-70
- Phenethylamines like Ariadne (4C-D; BL-3912; Dimoxamine), 5C-D, ASR-2001 (2CB-5PrO), 25N-N1-Nap, RS130-180, and DOI-NBOMe
- Ergolines and lysergamides like lisuride, ergotamine, and 2-bromo-LSD (BOL-148)
- Pyridopyrroloquinoxalines like IHCH-7086, IHCH-7079, and ITI-1549
- Others like AB-300, BMB-201, DLX-159, EB-003, ENX-105, ENX-205, GM-2040, HBL20017, RE245, TN-001, XYL-3001, and XYL-4001

However, most of the above-listed drugs have been concluded to be non-hallucinogenic based on animal behavioral measures of psychedelic-like effects such as the head-twitch response (HTR) assay in rodents. Many of these drugs have not been tested in humans and their putatively non-hallucinogenic natures have not been confirmed. Although available evidence is limited, some observations suggest that hallucinogenic effects may emerge at higher doses in some cases. For instance, while tabernanthalog has been reported to be non-hallucinogenic based on preclinical research, anecdotal reports suggest that it can produce mild hallucinogenic effects at sufficiently high doses in humans. Additionally, hallucinations have been observed in humans with high doses of lisuride, which is an often-cited non-hallucinogenic serotonin 5-HT_{2A} receptor agonist related to LSD, although the nature and mechanisms of these apparent hallucinogenic effects are unclear and dopamine D_{2} receptor agonism might alternatively be involved. Another drug, JRT, is the isoindole analogue of LSD and has reduced or possibly absent psychedelic-like effects in animals.

The precise mechanism by which non-hallucinogenic serotonin 5-HT_{2A} receptor agonists lack psychedelic effects is uncertain; it is thought that they may not activate the serotonin 5-HT_{2A} receptor with sufficient efficacy, possibly specifically with regard to the G_{q} pathway, to produce hallucinogenic effects. However, many of these drugs have nonetheless been found to produce psychoplastogenic effects mediated by serotonin 5-HT_{2A} receptor activation and to an equivalent extent as with psychedelics. This might be involved in the antidepressant-like effects of these drugs per animal studies, and non-hallucinogenic serotonin 5-HT_{2A} receptor agonists may have therapeutic potential similarly to psychedelics.

In preclinical models, animals administered non-hallucinogenic serotonin 5-HT_{2A} receptor agonists exhibit fewer hallucinogen-associated behaviors at doses that produce rapid antidepressant-like effects. The psychoplastogenic effects of non-hallucinogenic serotonin 5-HT_{2A} receptor agonists appear to coincide with their rapid antidepressant-like effects in animal models. It has been suggested that non-hallucinogenic serotonin 5-HT_{2A} receptor agonists may be more suitable for broader clinical use compared to psychedelics because of their reduced perception-altering effects.

== Selective 5-HT_{2A} receptor agonists ==
Selective serotonin 5-HT_{2A} receptor agonists are known and include 25CN-NBOH, BMB-202, DMBMPP (juncosamine), DOI-NBOMe, LPH-5 ((S)-2C-TFM-3PIP), LPH-48, and TGF-8027.

== Biased 5-HT_{2A} receptor agonists ==
The serotonin 5-HT_{2A} receptor is coupled to multiple downstream signaling pathways. A number of biased agonists of the serotonin 5-HT_{2A} receptor are known. These include the G protein-biased lisuride, (R)-69, and (R)-70; the β-arrestin-biased LSD, RS130-180, 25CN-NBOH and derivatives, 25N-N1-Nap, 25N-NBPh, IHCH-7079, and IHCH-7086; and others like DOI-NBOMe, TCB-2 (2CBCB), and 5-phenoxytryptamine (OVT2). 2C-B has been identified as a biased serotonin 5-HT_{2A} receptor agonist favoring Ca^{2+} mobilization over β-arrestin2 recruitment. The functional selectivity of various serotonergic psychedelics at the serotonin 5-HT_{2A} receptor has been studied. Besides the serotonin 5-HT_{2A} receptor, many psychedelics are biased agonists of the serotonin 5-HT_{2C} receptor.

== Peripherally selective 5-HT_{2A} receptor agonists ==
Peripherally selective serotonin 5-HT_{2A} receptor agonists that lack effects on the brain are known. Aside from serotonin itself, α-methylserotonin, and the partially peripherally selective bufotenin (N,N-dimethylserotonin), another notable example of a peripherally selective serotonin 5-HT_{2A} receptor agonist is AL-34662. This drug was investigated for the potential treatment of eye diseases such as ocular hypertension and glaucoma. IHCH-8110 is a peripherally selective serotonin 5-HT_{2A} receptor agonist with beneficial effects against colorectal cancer in preclinical research. Ergotamine may also be a peripherally selective serotonin 5-HT_{2A} receptor agonist, and is used as an obstetric drug and antimigraine agent. Psilocybin and psilocin analogues found in psilocybin-containing mushrooms, including baeocystin, norpsilocin, aeruginascin, and 4-HO-TMT, have been found to be peripherally selective serotonin 5-HT_{2A} receptor agonists as well.

== Selected effects of 5-HT_{2A} receptor agonists ==
=== Anti-inflammatory 5-HT_{2A} receptor agonists ===
Some serotonergic psychedelics, such as (R)-DOI and psilocybin, show highly potent anti-inflammatory effects mediated by serotonin 5-HT_{2A} receptor activation. Other serotonergic psychedelics, such as LSD, are less potent, and yet other psychedelics, like DOTFM, show no anti-inflammatory effects at all. Conversely, some serotonin 5-HT_{2A} receptor agonists, such as 2,5-DMA, have potent anti-inflammatory effects with no apparent psychedelic effects. These findings indicate that the psychedelic and anti-inflammatory effects of serotonin 5-HT_{2A} receptor agonists are mediated by different downstream signaling pathways and are fully dissociable. Serotonin 5-HT_{2A} receptor agonists with reduced psychedelic potential but retained anti-inflammatory effects, such as 2C-iBu (ELE-02), are being studied to treat inflammatory disorders.

=== 5-HT_{2A} receptor agonists and organ fibrosis ===
Many serotonin 5-HT_{2A} receptor agonists, due to lack of selectivity and activation of the closely related serotonin 5-HT_{2B} receptor, may have the potential to produce organ fibrosis and associated complications such as cardiac valvulopathy or pulmonary hypertension with long-term use. This has been observed with pharmaceutical drugs such as fenfluramine, methysergide, ergotamine, cabergoline, and pergolide, among others, which has led to market withdrawal or restrictions on use of such agents. Infrequent or occasional use of serotonergic psychedelics is thought to be safe and not pose a significant risk, but very frequent use or microdosing may carry risk. Not all serotonin 5-HT_{2A} receptor agonists are also potent serotonin 5-HT_{2B} receptor agonists however. For example, many phenethylamine psychedelics show substantial selectivity for the serotonin 5-HT_{2A} and 5-HT_{2C} receptors over the serotonin 5-HT_{2B} receptor. In addition, selective serotonin 5-HT_{2A} receptor agonists that show less or no activation of other serotonin receptors such as the serotonin 5-HT_{2B} receptor, such as 25CN-NBOH, DMBMPP, LPH-5, and TGF-8027, have been developed. Moreover, selective serotonin 5-HT_{2B} receptor antagonists, including peripherally selective drugs like VU0530244, are being developed, and may be able to block the complications of serotonin 5-HT_{2B} receptor agonism.

=== 5-HT_{2A} receptor agonists and neurotoxicity ===
Serotonin 5-HT_{2A} receptor agonists may produce neurotoxicity, for instance serotonergic neurotoxicity, at high concentrations or doses. In addition, they may potentiate the serotonergic neurotoxicity of MDMA.

== Indirect 5-HT_{2A} receptor agonists ==
Serotonergic agents that elevate serotonin levels can act as indirect serotonin 5-HT_{2A} receptor agonists. Examples of such agents include serotonin precursors like tryptophan and 5-hydroxytryptophan (5-HTP), serotonin reuptake inhibitors (SRIs) like selective serotonin reuptake inhibitors (SSRIs) and various other antidepressants, monoamine oxidase inhibitors (MAOIs), and serotonin releasing agents (SRAs) like fenfluramine and MDMA. Direct serotonin 5-HT_{2A} receptor agonists and serotonin-elevating drugs have differing effects. As an example, whereas serotonin-elevating drugs have a risk of serotonin syndrome, major serotonergic psychedelics like psilocybin and LSD are partial agonists of the serotonin 5-HT_{2A} receptor and have little or no risk of serotonin syndrome even in the context of large overdoses. However, one notable group of psychedelics, the NBOMe drugs, have higher efficacy at the serotonin 5-HT_{2A} receptor and can produce serotonin syndrome. As another example, serotonin is a highly hydrophilic molecule and is unable to enter neurons and activate intracellular serotonin 5-HT_{2A} receptors, which have been found to mediate the psychoplastogenic effects of exogenous serotonin 5-HT_{2A} receptor agonists. These intracellular serotonin 5-HT_{2A} receptors may also contribute to the psychedelic effects of serotonin 5-HT_{2A} receptor agonists.

== See also ==
- Serotonin 5-HT_{2A} receptor § Agonists
- Serotonin receptor agonist
- Serotonin receptor antagonist
- Serotonin 5-HT_{2A} receptor antagonist
- Serotonin 5-HT_{2C} receptor agonist
- Serotonin 5-HT_{3} receptor antagonist
- List of investigational hallucinogens and entactogens
- List of miscellaneous serotonin 5-HT_{2A} receptor agonists
- Trip killer § Serotonergic psychedelic antidotes
- Locomotor activity § Serotonin receptor agonists
