= MK-212 =

Clinical data
- Other names: CPP; 6-Chloro-2-(1-piperazinyl)pyrazine; 1-Piperazinyl-6-chloropyrazine
- Routes of administration: Oral
- Drug class: Serotonin receptor agonist; Serotonin 5-HT_{2} receptor agonist; Serotonin 5-HT_{2A} receptor agonist; Serotonergic psychedelic; Hallucinogen
- ATC code: None

Identifiers
- IUPAC name: 2-chloro-6-(piperazin-1-yl)pyrazine
- CAS Number: 64022-27-1
- PubChem CID: 107992
- IUPHAR/BPS: 165
- ChemSpider: 97104
- UNII: 62C3N7238U
- CompTox Dashboard (EPA): DTXSID80214007

Chemical and physical data
- Formula: C_{8}H_{11}ClN_{4}
- Molar mass: 198.65 g·mol^{−1}
- 3D model (JSmol): Interactive image
- SMILES: Clc1nc(cnc1)N2CCNCC2
- InChI: InChI=1S/C8H11ClN4/c9-7-5-11-6-8(12-7)13-3-1-10-2-4-13/h5-6,10H,1-4H2; Key:CJAWPFJGFFNXQI-UHFFFAOYSA-N

MK-212, also known as 6-chloro-2-(1-piperazinyl)pyrazine (CPP), is a serotonin receptor agonist of the arylpiperazine family. It is specifically described as a non-selective serotonin 5-HT_{2} receptor agonist or as a "relatively selective serotonin 5-HT_{2C} receptor full agonist. The drug promotes the secretion of serum prolactin and cortisol in humans.

== Use and effects ==
MK-212 did not produce hallucinogenic effects in humans at doses of up to 40 mg orally. However, in other research, it occasionally produced LSD-like effects in alcoholic patients at a dose of 20 mg. In addition, subsequent studies found that MK-212 at 20 mg significantly increased ratings of feeling high and feeling strange.

== Pharmacology ==
=== Pharmacodynamics ===
MK-212 is an agonist of the serotonin 5-HT_{2} receptors, including the serotonin 5-HT_{2C}, 5-HT_{2B}, and 5-HT_{2A} receptors, in that order of potency. It is a full agonist of the serotonin 5-HT_{2C} receptor, a moderate-efficacy partial agonist of the serotonin 5-HT_{2B} receptor, and a partial to full agonist of the serotonin 5-HT_{2A} receptor. The drug shows similar potency in activating the serotonin 5-HT_{2C} and 5-HT_{2B} receptors and around 10- to 30-fold lower relative potency in activating the serotonin 5-HT_{2A} receptor. It also shows low affinity for the serotonin 5-HT_{1A} and 5-HT_{1B} receptors. The comprehensive receptor interactions of MK-212 have been studied. A study found that MK-212 only weakly stimulated serotonin release.

In a 1977 study by Clineschidt and colleagues, they dosed mice with varying concentrations of MK-212, and observed its effects. The result correlated very well to binding of indolealkylamine receptors, such as the serotonin and tryptamine receptors, which shows four characteristics. Namely, increased frequency of muscle twitching, head twitches, "an increase in the strength of the crossed extensor reflex in the acutely spinalized rat", and the cause of complex motor syndrome. In a later study, MK-212 dose-dependently induced the head-twitch response when combined with the selective serotonin 5-HT_{2C} receptor antagonist SB-242084. In contrast to the preceding findings, MK-212 has been found to dose-dependently suppress the head-twitch response induced by the serotonergic psychedelic DOI, suggesting that serotonin 5-HT_{2C} receptor activation may inhibit the head-twitch response.

== History ==
MK-212 was first described in the scientific literature by 1977.

== See also ==
- Substituted piperazine
- 2C-B-PP
- mCPP
- ORG-12962
- Quipazine
