= SB-228357 =

Chemical compound

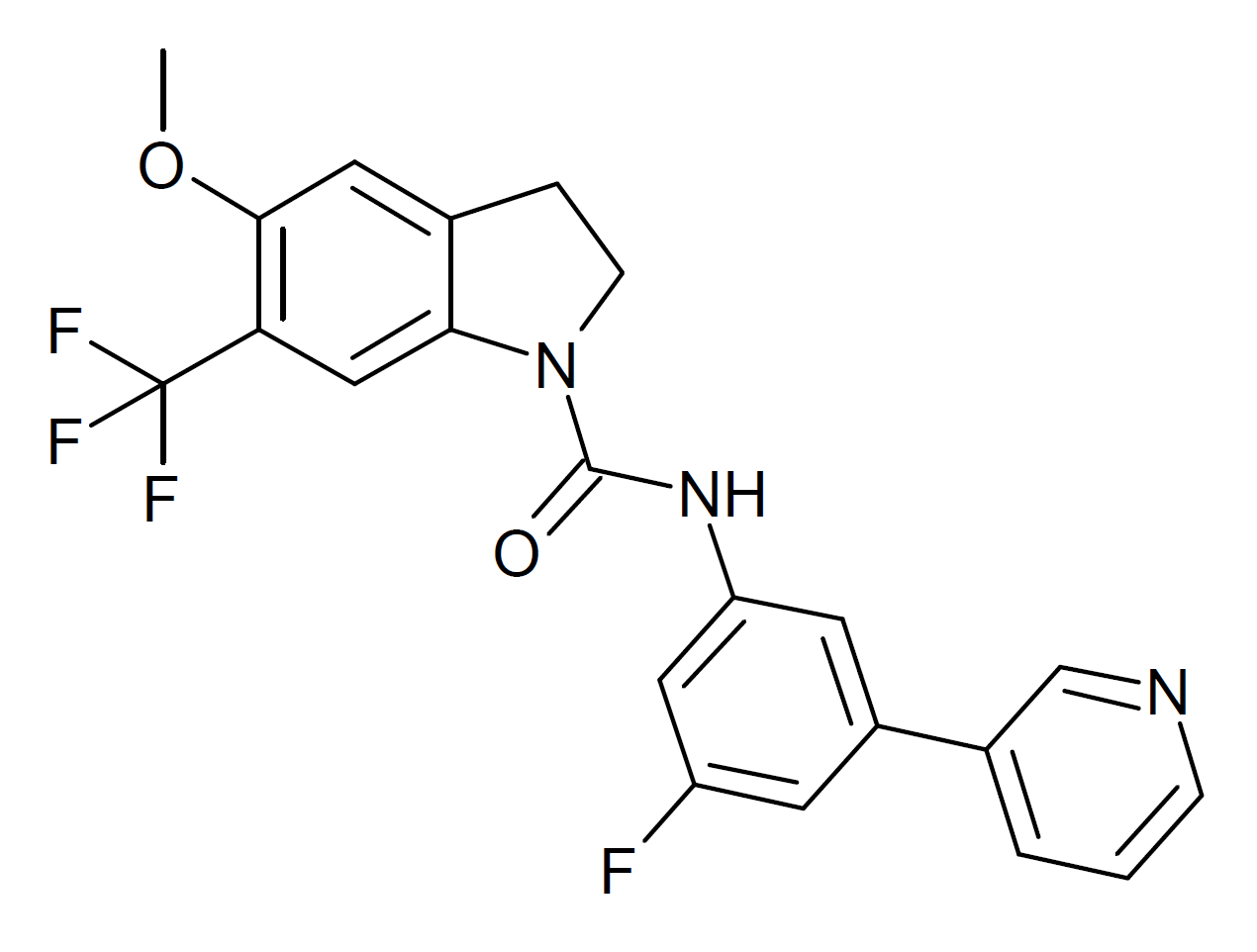

Identifiers
- IUPAC name: N-(3-fluoro-5-pyridin-3-ylphenyl)-5-methoxy-6-(trifluoromethyl)-2,3-dihydroindole-1-carboxamide
- CAS Number: 181629-93-6
- PubChem CID: 443390
- ChemSpider: 391619
- UNII: 5RDN2E8E97
- KEGG: C11742
- ChEBI: CHEBI:8979
- ChEMBL: ChEMBL14276
- CompTox Dashboard (EPA): DTXSID9042621

Chemical and physical data
- Formula: C_{22}H_{17}F_{4}N_{3}O_{2}
- Molar mass: 431.391 g·mol^{−1}
- 3D model (JSmol): Interactive image
- SMILES: COC1=C(C=C2C(=C1)CCN2C(=O)NC3=CC(=CC(=C3)C4=CN=CC=C4)F)C(F)(F)F
- InChI: InChI=1S/C22H17F4N3O2/c1-31-20-9-13-4-6-29(19(13)11-18(20)22(24,25)26)21(30)28-17-8-15(7-16(23)10-17)14-3-2-5-27-12-14/h2-3,5,7-12H,4,6H2,1H3,(H,28,30); Key:RRJLJKRFFRZRAF-UHFFFAOYSA-N

SB-228357 is a drug which acts as a selective antagonist of the serotonin 5-HT_{2B} and 5-HT_{2C} receptors.

It has antidepressant and anxiolytic effects in animal models and inhibits 5-HT_{2B} mediated proliferation of cardiac fibroblasts. It has also been found to reverse meta-chlorophenylpiperazine (mCPP)-induced hypolocomotion and to attenuate haloperidol-induced catalepsy.

The drug was under development by GlaxoSmithKline for the treatment of major depressive disorder and anxiety disorders. It reached the preclinical research phase of development. However, development of the drug was discontinued.

== See also ==
- RS-102221
- SB-242084
- SB-243213
