= BMB-105 =

Chemical compound

Clinical data
- Other names: BMB105
- Routes of administration: Oral
- Drug class: Serotonin 5-HT_{2C} receptor agonist
- ATC code: None

BMB-105 is a selective serotonin 5-HT_{2C} receptor agonist of the phenylcyclopropylmethylamine (PCPMA) family which is under development for the treatment of excessive appetite and other symptoms in Prader–Willi syndrome. It is taken orally.

The drug is described as a highly selective biased agonist of the serotonin 5-HT_{2C} receptor, with activation of the G_{q} signaling pathway but minimal β-arrestin recruitment.

BMB-105 is under development by Bright Minds Biosciences. As of November 2025, it is in phase 1 clinical trials. The drug is described as a follow-on drug to Bright Mind Bioscience's more advanced candidate BMB-101 and as a potential "best-in-class" medication.

The exact chemical structure of BMB-105 does not yet appear to have been disclosed. However, it is known to be a 2-phenylcyclopropylmethylamine (PCPMA) derivative similarly to BMB-101 and to share structural commonalities with tranylcypromine.

== See also ==
- List of investigational Prader–Willi syndrome drugs
- BMB-101
- BMB-201
- BMB-202
