= CEPC =

CEPC may refer to:

- Caribbean Programme for Economic Competitiveness, a Canadian Government programme covering historical good-relations and cooperation between the Commonwealth-Caribbean and the nation of Canada.
- Carpet Export Promotion Council, an agency of the Indian Ministry of Textiles
- Cashew Export Promotion Council of India, headquartered in the city of Kollam
- Centro de Estudios Políticos y Constitucionales (Centre for Political and Constitutional Studies), an autonomous agency associated with the Ministry for the Presidency, Spain
- Certified Executive Pastry Chef ®, an American Culinary Federation (ACF) certification
- 6-Chloro-5-ethoxy-N-(pyridin-2-yl)indoline-1-carboxamide, a pharmaceutical
- Circular Electron Positron Collider, a proposed particle accelerator in China
- Crown Estate Paving Commission, the body responsible for managing certain aspects of the built environment around Regent's Park, London
