= Bright Minds Biosciences =

American pharmaceutical company

- Industry: Pharmaceutical
- Founded: 2017; 9 years ago
- Founder: Ian McDonald, Gideon Shapiro
- Headquarters: New York City, New York, United States
- Key people: Alan Kozikowski
- Products: BMB-101, BMB-105, BMB-201, BMB-202
- Website: brightmindsbio.com

Bright Minds Biosciences (BMB) is an American pharmaceutical company which is developing serotonin 5-HT_{2} receptor agonists for potential medical use.

It has a particular focus on serotonin 5-HT_{2C} receptor agonists, for instance to treat rare epilepsies and other conditions. Another area of focus for the company is serotonergic psychedelics and non-hallucinogenic psychoplastogens.

The company was co-founded by Ian McDonald and Gideon Shapiro. The lead scientist at Bright Minds Biosciences was previously Alan Kozikowski. Bright Mind Biosciences was founded in 2017 and its headquarters are in New York City, New York.

== Drug candidates ==
Bright Minds Biosciences' drug candidates include the following:

Bright Minds Biosciences drug candidates
Drug	Action	Structural scaffold	Indications	Highest phase	Ref
BMB‑101	Selective serotonin 5-HT_{2C} receptor biased agonist (G_{q} over β-arrestin)	Phenylcyclopropylmethylamine	Absence epilepsy, binge-eating disorder, Dravet syndrome, Lennox–Gastaut syndrome, Pitt–Hopkins syndrome, Prader–Willi syndrome, and Rett syndrome	Phase 2 (entering phase 3)	
BMB‑105	Selective serotonin 5-HT_{2C} receptor biased agonist (G_{q} over β-arrestin)	Phenylcyclopropylmethylamine	Prader–Willi syndrome	Phase 1	
BMB‑201	Serotonin 5-HT_{2A} and 5-HT_{2C} receptor agonist, other actions (non-hallucinogenic psychoplastogen; prodrug of BMB-A39a)	Tryptamine	Depressive disorders, pain	Preclinical	
BMB‑202	Selective serotonin 5-HT_{2A} receptor agonist (serotonergic psychedelic)	N-Benzylphenethylamine	Depressive disorders, post-traumatic stress disorder (PTSD)	Preclinical	

The company has also patented azepinoindoles acting as potent serotonin 5-HT_{2} receptor agonists and psychedelics, such as Pharm-136.

== See also ==
- List of psychedelic pharmaceutical companies
- List of investigational hallucinogens and entactogens
