= C16H21N5O2 =

The molecular formula C_{16}H_{21}N_{5}O_{2} (molar mass: 315.37 g/mol) may refer to:

- Alizapride
- PRX-00933
