= ATHX-105 =

Clinical data
- Other names: ATHX105
- Routes of administration: Oral
- Drug class: Serotonin 5-HT_{2C} receptor agonist; Appetite suppressant; Anti-obesity drug
- ATC code: None

ATHX-105 is a highly selective serotonin 5-HT_{2C} receptor agonist which was under development for the treatment of obesity but was never marketed. It is taken orally. The drug has been found to reduce food intake and produce weight loss in animals. ATHX-105 was developed by Athersys. It reached and completed several phase 1 clinical trials and was preparing to enter phase 2 trials prior to the discontinuation of its development due to safety concerns in March 2009. The chemical structure of ATHX-105 does not appear to have been disclosed.

== See also ==
- Serotonin 5-HT_{2C} receptor agonist
