= SCQ1 =

Chemical compound

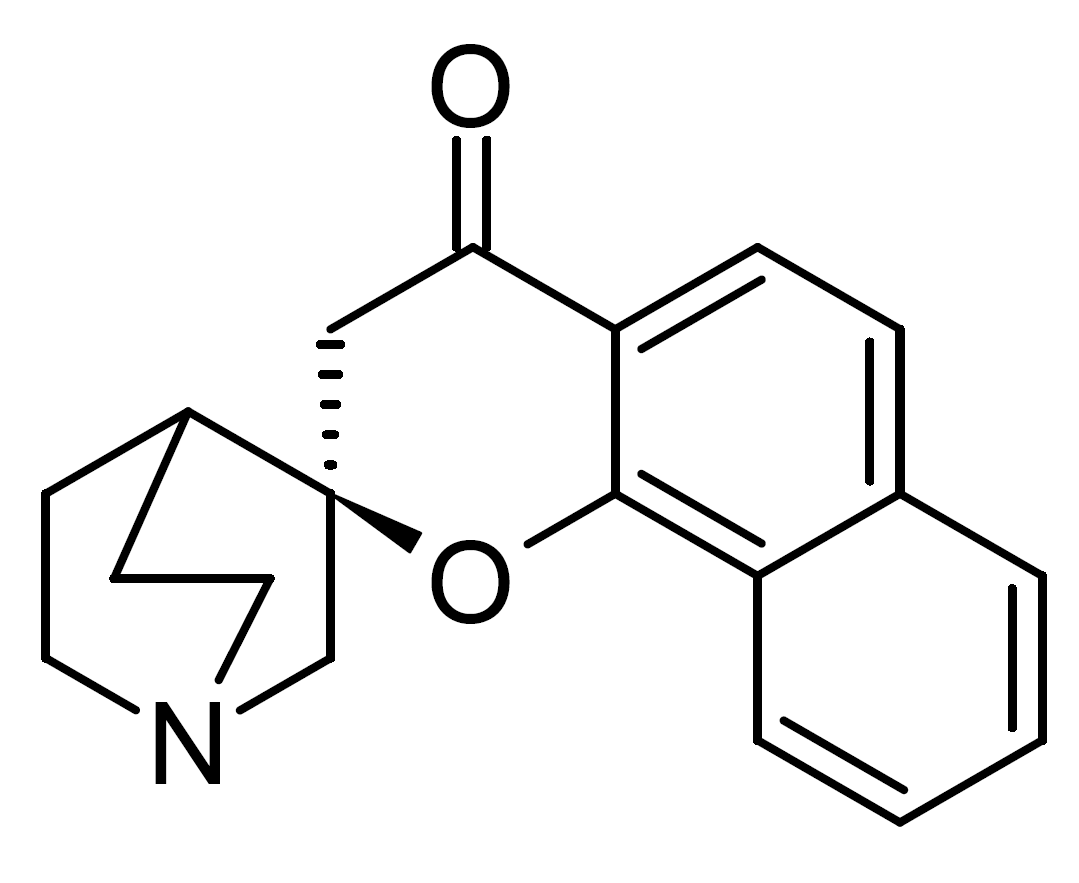

Identifiers
- IUPAC name: (S)-spiro[4-azabicyclo[2.2.2]octane-2,2'-benzo[h]chromen]-4'(3'H)-one
- ChemSpider: 88790995

Chemical and physical data
- Formula: C_{19}H_{19}NO_{2}
- Molar mass: 293.366 g·mol^{−1}
- 3D model (JSmol): Interactive image
- SMILES: O=C3C[C@@]1(CN2CCC1CC2)Oc4c3ccc5ccccc45

(S)-SCQ1 is a drug which acts as a potent and selective antagonist for the 5-HT_{2B} and 5-HT_{2C} serotonin receptors, but with only modest affinity for the closely related 5-HT_{2A} receptor and other targets such as 5-HT_{7}. Since most currently available 5-HT_{2} class ligands have relatively poor selectivity and bind to all three subtypes, the selectivity of (S)-SCQ1 is expected to be useful for studying 5-HT_{2A} receptor mediated responses in the absence of 5-HT_{2B} and 5-HT_{2C} activation.

== See also ==
- SB-206553
- SB-242,084
- Z3517967757
