= VR-1065 =

Clinical data
- Other names: VR1065; R-1065; R1065; VMR-003; VMR003
- Routes of administration: Unspecified
- Drug class: Serotonin 5-HT_{2C} receptor agonist
- ATC code: None

VR-1065 is a serotonin 5-HT_{2C} receptor agonist which was under development for the treatment of obesity but was never marketed. Its pharmacology has not been described. The drug was under development by Roche and Vernalis Group. It reached phase 1 clinical trials prior to the discontinuation of its development in 2002. The drug's development was discontinued due to suboptimal pharmacokinetics in phase 1 trials. The chemical structure of VR-1065 has not been disclosed.

== See also ==
- Serotonin 5-HT_{2C} receptor agonist
