= BMB-202 =

Serotonergic psychedelic

Clinical data
- Other names: BMB202
- Routes of administration: Oral
- Drug class: Serotonin 5-HT_{2A} receptor agonist; Serotonergic psychedelic; Hallucinogen
- ATC code: None

Pharmacokinetic data
- Protein binding: 91–94%
- Elimination half-life: <2 hours (predicted)
- Duration of action: 1–2 hours (predicted)

BMB-202 is a selective serotonin 5-HT_{2A} receptor agonist and psychedelic drug of the N-benzylphenethylamine family which is under development for the treatment of depressive disorders and post-traumatic stress disorder (PTSD). It is taken orally.

== Pharmacology ==
=== Pharmacodynamics ===
BMB-202 activities
Target	Affinity (K_{i}, nM)
5-HT_{2A}	ND (K_{i}); 4.4 (EC_{50}); 101% (E_{max})
5-HT_{2B}	ND (K_{i}); 2,827 (EC_{50}); 94% (E_{max})
5-HT_{2C}	ND (K_{i}); 223 (EC_{50}); 113% (E_{max})
Notes: The smaller the value, the more avidly the drug binds to the site. All proteins are human unless otherwise specified. Refs:

BMB-202 acts as a highly selective full agonist of the serotonin 5-HT_{2A} receptor. In terms of EC_{50} values, it shows 36- to 40-fold selectivity for activation of the serotonin 5-HT_{2A} receptor over the serotonin 5-HT_{2C} receptor and 500-fold selectivity for activation of the serotonin 5-HT_{2A} receptor over the serotonin 5-HT_{2B} receptor. It has been claimed by its developer that BMB-202 is the most selective serotonin 5-HT_{2A} receptor agonist yet to be discovered or to be in development, at least as of late 2024.

BMB-202 induces the head-twitch response (HTR), a behavioral proxy of psychedelic effects, in animals. Hence, it is putatively hallucinogenic in humans. As with other psychedelics like psilocybin, the HTR induced by BMB-202 shows a biphasic or inverted U-shaped dose–response curve.

The drug shows a pharmacokinetic profile of high peak levels, rapid metabolic clearance, and a short elimination half-life in animals. It is predicted that BMB-202 will have a short half-life of less than 2 hours and short duration of 1 to 2 hours in humans. In relation to this, the drug is described as a "fast-on-fast-off" compound. The expected short duration of BMB-202 is analogous to the short duration of dimethyltryptamine (DMT). Short-acting psychedelics like DMT and BMB-202 may be more suitable for use in clinical therapeutic settings. BMB-202 is also described as having rapid absorption and brain distribution, high bioavailability, and significant first-pass metabolism resulting in it being fast-acting and having a short duration.

== Chemistry ==
"Compound 109", a lead highly selective serotonin 5-HT_{2A} receptor agonist of the N-benzylphenethylamine family with the same preclinical pharmacology as BMB-202 patented by Bright Minds Biosciences.

The exact chemical structure of BMB-202 does not yet appear to have been disclosed. However, it is known to be an N-benzylphenethylamine derivative. In addition, selective serotonin 5-HT_{2A} receptor agonists of the N-benzylphenethylamine family have been patented by Bright Minds Biosciences, for instance lead agent "compound 109" (N-(2-methylthiobenzyl)-2-hydroxy-4-cyanophenethylamine).

== Research ==
BMB-202 is under development by Bright Minds Biosciences. As of September 2025, it is in the preclinical research stage of development for treatment of depressive disorders and PTSD.

== See also ==
- List of investigational hallucinogens and entactogens
- Substituted N-benzylphenethylamine
- BMB-101
- BMB-105
- BMB-201
