= C15H18N2 =

The molecular formula C_{15}H_{18}N_{2} may refer to:

- N-Isopropyl-N'-phenyl-1,4-phenylenediamine
- Pirlindole
- WAY-629
- N-ethyl-lanicemine
