= Pharm-136 =

Clinical data
- Other names: "Compound #1"; "Cpd #1"; 5-HT2C agonist-11; 7-Methyl-10-hydroxynoribogaminalog
- Drug class: Serotonin 5-HT_{2} receptor agonist; Serotonin 5-HT_{2A} receptor agonist; Serotonergic psychedelic; Hallucinogen
- ATC code: None

Identifiers
- IUPAC name: 7-methyl-1,2,3,4,5,6-hexahydroazepino[4,5-b]indol-10-ol
- CAS Number: 3006787-99-8
- PubChem CID: 170319648
- ChemSpider: 133321960

Chemical and physical data
- Formula: C_{13}H_{16}N_{2}O
- Molar mass: 216.284 g·mol^{−1}
- 3D model (JSmol): Interactive image
- SMILES: CC1=C2C(=C(C=C1)O)C3=C(N2)CCNCC3
- InChI: InChI=1S/C13H16N2O/c1-8-2-3-11(16)12-9-4-6-14-7-5-10(9)15-13(8)12/h2-3,14-16H,4-7H2,1H3; Key:IMUNBYGTPDZBIR-UHFFFAOYSA-N

Pharm-136, also known as 7-methyl-10-hydroxynoribogaminalog, is a serotonin 5-HT_{2} receptor agonist and psychedelic drug of the ibogalog family.

== Pharmacology ==
=== Pharmacodynamics ===
Pharm-136 acts as a potent serotonin 5-HT_{2} receptor agonist, with EC_{50} (E_{max}) values of 0.6 nM (102%) at the serotonin 5-HT_{2A} receptor, 3.5 nM (52%) at the serotonin 5-HT_{2B} receptor, and 0.5 nM (101%) at the serotonin 5-HT_{2C} receptor. The drug showed far lower agonistic potency or was inactive at all other serotonin receptors. As an agonist of the serotonin 5-HT_{2A} receptor in vitro, Pharm-136 showed 29-fold greater potency as well as higher efficacy (101% vs. 80%) than psilocin.

The drug produces the head-twitch response, a behavioral proxy of psychedelic effects, in rodents. Its median effective dose (ED_{50}) was 3.6 mg/kg, compared to 0.38 mg/kg (9.5-fold lower) in the case of psilocybin.

=== Pharmacokinetics ===
The preclinical pharmacokinetics of Pharm-136 have been studied.

== Chemistry ==
Pharm-136 is an ibogalog (azepinoindole) derivative and a cyclized tryptamine analogue of the non-hallucinogenic psychoplastogen 7-methylpsilocin.

=== Synthesis ===
The chemical synthesis of Pharm-136 has been described.

== History ==
Pharm-136 was patented by Bright Minds Biosciences in 2023. There is interest in Pharm-136 for potential therapeutic use.

== See also ==
- Ibogalog
- List of investigational hallucinogens and entactogens
