= SB-243213 =

Chemical compound

Clinical data
- Drug class: Serotonin 5-HT_{2C} receptor inverse agonist
- ATC code: None

Identifiers
- IUPAC name: 5-methyl-N-(6-[(2-methylpyridin-3-yl)oxy]pyridin-3-yl)-6-(trifluoromethyl)indoline-1-carboxamide
- CAS Number: 200940-23-4
- PubChem CID: 443391
- ChemSpider: 391620
- UNII: PA86JD65ZJ
- CompTox Dashboard (EPA): DTXSID0047323

Chemical and physical data
- Formula: C_{22}H_{19}F_{3}N_{4}O_{2}
- Molar mass: 428.415 g·mol^{−1}
- 3D model (JSmol): Interactive image
- SMILES: CC1=C(C(F)(F)F)C=C(N(C(NC2=CN=C(OC3=C(C)N=CC=C3)C=C2)=O)CC4)C4=C1
- InChI: InChI=1S/C22H19F3N4O2/c1-13-10-15-7-9-29(18(15)11-17(13)22(23,24)25)21(30)28-16-5-6-20(27-12-16)31-19-4-3-8-26-14(19)2/h3-6,8,10-12H,7,9H2,1-2H3,(H,28,30); Key:ZETBBVYSBABLHL-UHFFFAOYSA-N

SB-243213 is a drug which acts as a selective inverse agonist for the 5-HT_{2C} receptor and has anxiolytic effects. It has better than 100x selectivity for 5-HT_{2C} over all other receptor subtypes tested, and a longer duration of action compared to older 5-HT_{2C} antagonist ligands.

== See also ==
- CEPC
- RS-102221
- SB-242084
