= VA012 =

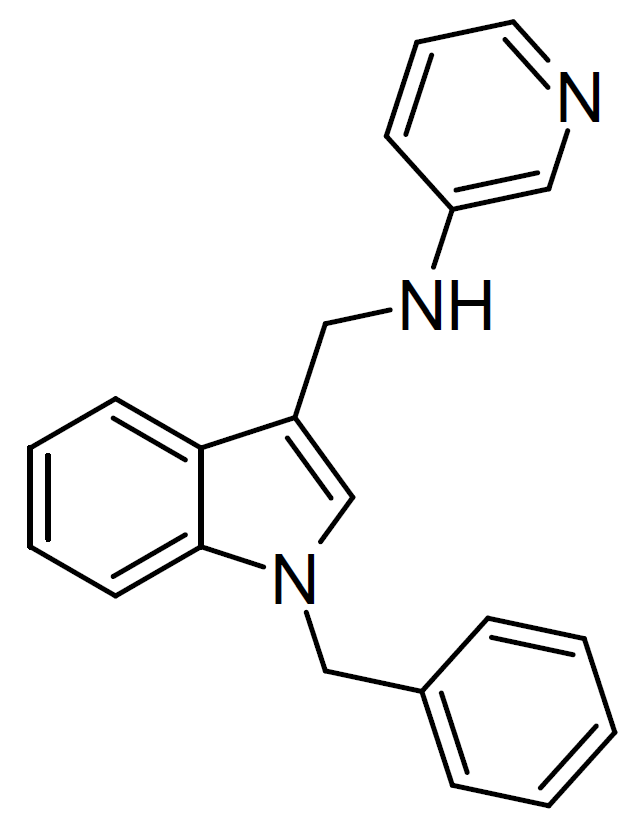

Identifiers
- IUPAC name: N-[(1-benzylindol-3-yl)methyl]pyridin-3-amine
- CAS Number: 885898-58-8
- PubChem CID: 1497577
- ChemSpider: 1234576
- ChEMBL: ChEMBL4095079

Chemical and physical data
- Formula: C_{21}H_{19}N_{3}
- Molar mass: 313.404 g·mol^{−1}
- 3D model (JSmol): Interactive image
- SMILES: C1=CC=C(C=C1)CN2C=C(C3=CC=CC=C32)CNC4=CN=CC=C4
- InChI: InChI=1S/C21H19N3/c1-2-7-17(8-3-1)15-24-16-18(20-10-4-5-11-21(20)24)13-23-19-9-6-12-22-14-19/h1-12,14,16,23H,13,15H2; Key:FXRHZHGEENHPFI-UHFFFAOYSA-N

VA012 is an experimental drug from the indole family, which is acts as a selective positive allosteric modulator of the 5-HT_{2C} receptor. It has anorectic effects in animal studies with an improved side effect profile compared to directly acting 5-HT_{2C} agonists such as lorcaserin.

== See also ==
- CTW0415
