= Phenylcyclopropylmethylamine =

Lumocaserin, a serotonin 5-HT_{2C} receptor agonist and PCPMA derivative.

Phenylcyclopropylmethylamines (PCPMAs), or 2-phenylcyclopropylmethylamines, are a class of chemical compounds and drugs related to other groups such as phenethylamines and phenylcyclopropylamines (e.g., tranylcypromine, DMCPA).

Drugs of the PCPMA family include serotonin–norepinephrine reuptake inhibitors (SNRIs) (e.g., milnacipran), monoamine oxidase inhibitors (MAOIs), melatonin receptor agonists, neurokinin NK_{3} receptor antagonists, dopamine D_{2} receptor agonists, dopamine D_{3} receptor modulators, serotonin 5-HT_{2C} receptor agonists (e.g., lumocaserin), and sigma σ_{1} receptor ligands, among others.

PCPMA itself is known to act as a potent and selective serotonin 5-HT_{2C} receptor agonist (and to a lesser extent as a serotonin 5-HT_{2B} receptor agonist), whereas tranylcypromine was more than 500-fold less potent as a serotonin 5-HT_{2C} receptor agonist in comparison.

Chemical synthesis of 2-phenylcyclopropylmethylamines has been reviewed.
