= CPD-1 =

Drug

Clinical data
- Other names: LS-193743; LS193743
- Drug class: Serotonin 5-HT_{2} receptor agonist; Serotonin 5-HT_{2A} receptor agonist
- ATC code: None

Legal status
- Legal status: In general: uncontrolled

Identifiers
- IUPAC name: (3S)-3-methyl-1-[4-(trifluoromethyl)-1-benzofuran-7-yl]piperazine
- CAS Number: 325145-37-7
- PubChem CID: 9925822
- ChemSpider: 8101457
- UNII: ZZ7JB9QBU3
- ChEMBL: ChEMBL2260570
- CompTox Dashboard (EPA): DTXSID901336526

Chemical and physical data
- Formula: C_{14}H_{15}F_{3}N_{2}O
- Molar mass: 284.282 g·mol^{−1}
- 3D model (JSmol): Interactive image
- SMILES: C[C@H]1CN(CCN1)C2=C3C(=C(C=C2)C(F)(F)F)C=CO3
- InChI: InChI=1S/C14H15F3N2O/c1-9-8-19(6-5-18-9)12-3-2-11(14(15,16)17)10-4-7-20-13(10)12/h2-4,7,9,18H,5-6,8H2,1H3/t9-/m0/s1; Key:RZSIBGYUCGYDKG-VIFPVBQESA-N

CPD-1 (LS-193743) is a drug with a benzofuranyl piperazine structure, which acts as a potent and selective agonist for the 5-HT_{2} receptor family, with highest affinity and full agonist efficacy at the 5-HT_{2C} subtype, and lower affinity and partial agonist action at the 5-HT_{2A} and 5-HT_{2B} subtypes.

== See also ==
- List of miscellaneous 5-HT_{2A} receptor agonists
- UCD0179
- 2,3-Dichlorophenylpiperazine
- 3-Chloro-4-fluorophenylpiperazine
- 2C-B-PP
- ORG-12962
- TFMFly
- TFMPP
