= A-372159 =

Chemical compound

Identifiers
- IUPAC name: (8aS,12aR)-2-(4-isopropoxy-2-(trifluoromethyl)phenyl)-6,7,8a,9,10,11,12,12a-octahydro-5H-[1,4]oxazepino[2,3,4-hi]pyrido[4,3-b]indole
- CAS Number: 313543-60-1
- ChemSpider: 9605283
- UNII: NK36K7QB8G
- CompTox Dashboard (EPA): DTXSID701028135

Chemical and physical data
- Formula: C_{24}H_{27}F_{3}N_{2}O_{2}
- Molar mass: 432.487 g·mol^{−1}
- 3D model (JSmol): Interactive image
- SMILES: FC(F)(C1=C(C2=CC3=C4C(OCCCN4[C@@]5([H])CCNC[C@@]35[H])=C2)C=CC(OC(C)C)=C1)F
- InChI: InChI=1S/C24H27F3N2O2/c1-14(2)31-16-4-5-17(20(12-16)24(25,26)27)15-10-18-19-13-28-7-6-21(19)29-8-3-9-30-22(11-15)23(18)29/h4-5,10-12,14,19,21,28H,3,6-9,13H2,1-2H3/t19-,21-/m0/s1; Key:LADKOBQJOCFCQU-FPOVZHCZSA-N

A-372159 is a drug which acts as a potent and selective partial agonist for the 5HT_{2C} receptor, with more than 100x selectivity over the closely related 5-HT_{2B} receptor and a Ki of 3nM. It has been found to produce anorectic effects in animal studies and produced significant weight loss in rats with no development of tolerance or serious side effects.
