= BMB-201 =

Serotonergic drug

Clinical data
- Other names: BMB201; BMB-A39a prodrug
- Drug class: Non-hallucinogenic serotonin 5-HT_{2A} and 5-HT_{2C} receptor partial agonist
- ATC code: None

BMB-201 is a serotonin 5-HT_{2A} and 5-HT_{2C} receptor agonist of the tryptamine family described as a non-hallucinogenic psychoplastogen which is under development for the treatment of depression, anxiety, pain, and other indications. Its route of administration is unspecified.

== Pharmacology ==
BMB-A39a activities
Target	Affinity (K_{i}, nM)
5-HT_{1F}	ND (K_{i}); 23 (EC_{50}); 92% (E_{max})
5-HT_{2A}	ND (K_{i}); 70–71 (EC_{50}); 68–69% (E_{max})
5-HT_{2B}	ND (K_{i}); ND (EC_{50}) <20% (E_{max})
5-HT_{2C}	ND (K_{i}); 6.7 (EC_{50}); 79% (E_{max})
5-HT_{6}	ND (K_{i}); 9 (EC_{50}); 48% (E_{max})
Notes: The smaller the value, the more avidly the drug binds to the site. All proteins are human unless otherwise specified. Refs:

BMB-201 is a prodrug of another compound known as BMB-A39a. This active metabolite acts as a biased partial agonist of the serotonin 5-HT_{2A} and 5-HT_{2C} receptors. BMB-A39a is slightly less efficacious in activating G_{q} signaling at the serotonin 5-HT_{2A} and 5-HT_{2C} receptors compared to psilocin (E_{max} = 68% vs. 82% at 5-HT_{2A} and 79% vs. 95% at 5-HT_{2C}, respectively). It is about 9-fold less potent in activating the serotonin 5-HT_{2A} receptor than psilocin, whereas its potency in activating the serotonin 5-HT_{2C} receptor is similar to that of psilocin. Relatedly, whereas psilocin shows balanced activation of both the serotonin 5-HT_{2A} and 5-HT_{2C} receptors, BMB-A39a is about 11-fold more potent in activating the serotonin 5-HT_{2C} receptor over the serotonin 5-HT_{2A} receptor.

In addition to the serotonin 5-HT_{2A} and 5-HT_{2C} receptors, BMB-A39a is a potent partial agonist of the serotonin 5-HT_{1F} and 5-HT_{6} receptors. On the other hand, it shows minimal or negligible activity in activating the serotonin 5-HT_{2B} receptor (E_{max} < 20%), and does not activate other serotonin receptors, for instance the serotonin 5-HT_{1B} and 5-HT_{1D} receptors.

BMB-A39a shows less than 70% efficacy in activating G_{q} signaling at the serotonin 5-HT_{2A} receptor, which has been associated with absence of hallucinogenic-like activity. Accordingly, BMB-201 is said to have minimal or absent psychedelic effects due to its reduced serotonin 5-HT_{2A} receptor intrinsic activity but to potently induce neuroplasticity. It has been reported to show effectiveness in animal models of depression, anxiety, pain, and substance use disorder.

== Chemistry ==
7-Methylpsilocin, a lead compound with the same in-vitro pharmacology as BMB-A39a patented by Bright Minds Biosciences. 7-Methylpsilocybin was also patented.

The exact chemical structure of BMB-201 does not yet appear to have been disclosed. However, it is known to be a tryptamine derivative. In addition, Bright Mind Biosciences has patented tryptamines and prodrugs as serotonin 5-HT_{2} receptor modulators, including for example 7-methylpsilocin and 7-methylpsilocybin.

== Research ==
BMB-201 is under development by Bright Minds Biosciences. As of September 2025, it is in the preclinical research stage of development for the treatment of depressive disorders and pain.

== See also ==
- List of investigational hallucinogens and entactogens
- Substituted tryptamine
- Non-hallucinogenic 5-HT_{2A} receptor agonist
- BMB-101
- BMB-105
- BMB-202
- Pharm-136
