= Centhaquine =

Cardiovascular medication

Clinical data
- Trade names: Lyfaquin
- Other names: Centhaquin; PMZ-2010; Compound-7173

Legal status
- Legal status: In general: ℞ (Prescription only)

Identifiers
- IUPAC name: 2-[2-[4-(3-Methylphenyl)piperazin-1-yl]ethyl]quinoline
- CAS Number: 57961-90-7
- PubChem CID: 162163
- DrugBank: DB16122
- ChemSpider: 142413
- UNII: QD4VI0J9T5
- KEGG: D11974
- ChEMBL: ChEMBL4594437
- CompTox Dashboard (EPA): DTXSID40206680

Chemical and physical data
- Formula: C_{22}H_{25}N_{3}
- Molar mass: 331.463 g·mol^{−1}
- 3D model (JSmol): Interactive image
- SMILES: CC1=CC(=CC=C1)N2CCN(CC2)CCC3=NC4=CC=CC=C4C=C3
- InChI: InChI=1S/C22H25N3/c1-18-5-4-7-21(17-18)25-15-13-24(14-16-25)12-11-20-10-9-19-6-2-3-8-22(19)23-20/h2-10,17H,11-16H2,1H3; Key:UJNWGFBJUHIJKK-UHFFFAOYSA-N

Centhaquine (brand name Lyfaquin) is a cardiovascular drug. In India, it is approved for the treatment of hypovolemic shock.

Centhaquine is a vasopressor that activates α_{2A}- and α_{2B}-adrenoreceptors. It increases venous return and improves tissue perfusion. The drug has more recently been identified as a potent and selective serotonin 5-HT_{2C} receptor agonist (EC_{50} = 35 nM). It has no detectable activity at the serotonin 5-HT_{2B} or 5-HT_{2C} receptors.
