= Bexicaserin =

Experimental drug

Clinical data
- Other names: LP352; LP-352; AN352; AN-352
- Routes of administration: Oral
- Drug class: Serotonin 5-HT_{2C} receptor agonist

Pharmacokinetic data
- Elimination half-life: 5–7 hours

Identifiers
- IUPAC name: (3R)-N-(2,2-difluoroethyl)-3-methyl-1,10-diazatricyclo[6.4.1.0^{4,13}]trideca-4,6,8(13)-triene-5-carboxamide
- CAS Number: 2035818-24-5
- PubChem CID: 122662787
- DrugBank: DB18885
- ChemSpider: 129309383
- UNII: R8XR1D6SCB
- KEGG: D13035
- ChEMBL: ChEMBL5314507

Chemical and physical data
- Formula: C_{15}H_{19}F_{2}N_{3}O
- Molar mass: 295.334 g·mol^{−1}
- 3D model (JSmol): Interactive image
- SMILES: C[C@H]1CN2CCNCC3=C2C1=C(C=C3)C(=O)NCC(F)F
- InChI: InChI=1S/C15H19F2N3O/c1-9-8-20-5-4-18-6-10-2-3-11(13(9)14(10)20)15(21)19-7-12(16)17/h2-3,9,12,18H,4-8H2,1H3,(H,19,21)/t9-/m0/s1; Key:KGOOOHQKLRUVSF-VIFPVBQESA-N

Bexicaserin (INN; developmental code names LP352 and AN352) is a selective serotonin 5-HT_{2C} receptor agonist which is under development for the treatment of Dravet syndrome and Lennox–Gastaut syndrome. It is taken by mouth.

The drug is highly selective for the serotonin 5-HT_{2C} receptor, with negligible affinity for the serotonin 5-HT_{2A} and 5-HT_{2B} receptors. Because it does not activate the serotonin 5-HT_{2B} receptor, bexicaserin is not expected to pose a risk of cardiac valvulopathy, unlike the existing agent fenfluramine.

The activation of serotonin 5-HT_{2C} receptors has been shown to reduce epileptic seizure activity by inhibiting T-type calcium channels (Ca_{v}3). These calcium channels facilitate high frequency burst firing in principal neurons of the subiculum. This firing pattern is upregulated following status epilepticus, with these hyperactive neurons often serving as the initiation point for seizures.

As of October 2024, bexicaserin is in phase 3 clinical trials for treatment of developmental disabilities. It is being developed by Longboard Pharmaceuticals.

== See also ==
- Serotonin 5-HT_{2C} receptor agonist
- BMB-101
- Clemizole
- Lorcaserin
- Vabicaserin
- KB-128
