= Anxiety/aggression-driven depression =

Anxiety/aggression-driven depression (also known as 5-HT related depression) is a prospective subtype of major depressive disorder first proposed by the Dutch psychiatrist Herman M. van Praag in 1996. Van Praag has continued to write on this topic in subsequent academic articles.

== Onset and symptoms ==
This proposed subtype is characterized by depression occurring as a consequence of psychic, somatic or external stressors. Praag theorizes that if the individual's stress threshold is insufficient or overly sensitive, a prolonged stress response via the HPA axis can trigger anxiety followed by significant lowering of mood, the mechanisms of which act to reenforce each other, keeping them a perpetual state of stress arousal, coupled with dysphoria; and that this occurs as a result of the stress response inhibiting the normal expression of neurotransmitters associated with wellbeing and pleasure. He proposes that those affected may experience panic attacks, depersonalization and other psychic and somatic symptoms common to both anxiety and depression disorders.

According to van Praag, in anxiety/aggression-driven depression "...dysregulation of anxiety and/or aggression are primordial and mood lowering is a derivative phenomenon."

== Treatment ==
It is proposed that ameliorating the stress response will allow neurotransmission to return to homeostasis. Anxiolytic medications that act as 5-HT receptor agonists (in particular, 5-HT1A) together with CRH and/or cortisol antagonists (which are implicated in the stress response) are hypothesized to be an appropriate method of achieving this therapeutic response. Psychological interventions can also help to raise the threshold for stress and thereby restore the stress response to normal.
