= Tenilapine =

Atypical antipsychotic

Tenilapine INN: tenilapine

Identifiers
- IUPAC name: (2E)-[5-(4-Methyl-1-piperazinyl)-9H-bisthieno[3,4-b:3',4'-e]azepin-9-ylidene]acetonitrile
- CAS Number: 82650-83-7
- PubChem CID: 6450478
- ChemSpider: 4953083
- UNII: D0U312O2BE
- ChEMBL: ChEMBL2105472
- CompTox Dashboard (EPA): DTXSID201336787

Chemical and physical data
- Formula: C_{17}H_{16}N_{4}S_{2}
- Molar mass: 340.46 g·mol^{−1}
- 3D model (JSmol): Interactive image
- SMILES: CN1CCN(CC1)C2=NC3=CSC=C3/C(=C/C#N)/C4=CSC=C42
- InChI: InChI=1S/C17H16N4S2/c1-20-4-6-21(7-5-20)17-15-10-22-8-13(15)12(2-3-18)14-9-23-11-16(14)19-17/h2,8-11H,4-7H2,1H3/b12-2+; Key:RVQVUMIXBGFJLZ-SWGQDTFXSA-N

Tenilapine is an atypical antipsychotic which has never been marketed in the US.

== Pharmacodynamics ==
Tenilapine has a relatively high affinity for the 5-HT_{2A} receptor, and relatively low (micromolar) affinities for dopamine receptors.

Binding affinities
Receptor	K_{i} (nM)
D_{2}	1584
D_{4}	721±300
5-HT_{2A}	40

The ratio of D_{2} to D_{4} bonding is similar to that of clozapine. Like many other atypical antipsychotics, it is a potent 5-HT_{2C} antagonist.
