= Vabicaserin =

Chemical compound

Clinical data
- Other names: SCA-136
- Routes of administration: By mouth
- Drug class: Serotonin 5-HT_{2C} receptor agonist
- ATC code: None

Legal status
- Legal status: In general: uncontrolled

Identifiers
- IUPAC name: (9aR,12aS)-4,5,6,7,9,9a,10,11,12,12a-Decahydrocyclopenta[c][1,4]diazepino[6,7,1-ij]quinoline
- CAS Number: 887258-95-9
- PubChem CID: 11521822
- ChemSpider: 9696609
- UNII: WD9550HPNL
- CompTox Dashboard (EPA): DTXSID601336565 DTXSID80977680, DTXSID601336565

Chemical and physical data
- Formula: C_{15}H_{21}ClN_{2}
- Molar mass: 264.80 g·mol^{−1}
- 3D model (JSmol): Interactive image
- SMILES: C1C[C@H]2CN3CCNCC4=C3C(=CC=C4)[C@H]2C1
- InChI: InChI=1S/C15H20N2/c1-3-11-9-16-7-8-17-10-12-4-2-5-13(12)14(6-1)15(11)17/h1,3,6,12-13,16H,2,4-5,7-10H2/t12-,13-/m0/s1; Key:NPTIPEQJIDTVKR-STQMWFEESA-N

Vabicaserin (codenamed SCA-136) is an investigational antipsychotic and anorectic that was under development by Wyeth. As of 2010, it is no longer in clinical trials for the treatment of psychosis. It was also under investigation as an antidepressant, but this indication was dropped as well.

Vabicaserin acts as a selective 5-HT_{2C} receptor full agonist (K_{i} = 3 nM; EC_{50} = 8 nM; IA = 100% (relative to 5-HT)) and 5-HT_{2B} receptor antagonist (IC_{50} = 29 nM). It is also a very weak antagonist at the 5-HT_{2A} receptor (IC_{50} = 1,650 nM), though this action is not clinically significant. By activating 5-HT_{2C} receptors, vabicaserin inhibits dopamine release in the mesolimbic pathway, likely underlying its efficacy in alleviating positive symptoms of schizophrenia, and increases acetylcholine and glutamate levels in the prefrontal cortex, suggesting benefits against cognitive symptoms as well.

== See also ==
- List of investigational antipsychotics
- List of investigational bipolar disorder drugs
- Bexicaserin
- BMB-101
- Lorcaserin
- WAY-163909
