= 3-Chloro-4-fluorophenylpiperazine =

Chemical compound

Clinical data
- ATC code: none

Identifiers
- IUPAC name: 1-(3-chloro-4-fluorophenyl)piperazine
- CAS Number: 91532-33-1 95884-48-3 (hydrochloride)
- PubChem CID: 2779263
- ChemSpider: 2059498
- UNII: RQS83M82Q6
- CompTox Dashboard (EPA): DTXSID70381353
- ECHA InfoCard: 100.337.145

Chemical and physical data
- Formula: C_{10}H_{12}ClFN_{2}
- Molar mass: 214.67 g·mol^{−1}
- 3D model (JSmol): Interactive image
- SMILES: C1CN(CCN1)C2=CC(=C(C=C2)F)Cl
- InChI: InChI=1S/C10H12ClFN2/c11-9-7-8(1-2-10(9)12)14-5-3-13-4-6-14/h1-2,7,13H,3-6H2; Key:MKXFXPRJCBUTLX-UHFFFAOYSA-N

3-Chloro-4-fluorophenylpiperazine (3,4-CFP, Kleferein) is a psychoactive drug of the phenylpiperazine class. It has been sold as a designer drug, first being identified in Poland in 2019.

== See also ==
- Substituted piperazine
- 2,3-Dichlorophenylpiperazine
- 2C-B-PP
- 3C-PEP
- CPD-1
- Org 12962
