= BMB-101 =

5-HT2C receptor agonist

Clinical data
- Other names: BMB101
- Routes of administration: Oral
- Drug class: Serotonin 5-HT_{2C} receptor agonist
- ATC code: None

BMB-101 is a selective serotonin 5-HT_{2C} receptor agonist of the phenylcyclopropylmethylamine (PCPMA) family which is under development for the treatment of absence epilepsy, binge eating disorder, Dravet syndrome, Lennox–Gastaut syndrome, Pitt–Hopkins syndrome, Prader–Willi syndrome, and Rett syndrome. It is taken orally.

== Pharmacology ==
=== Pharmacodynamics ===
BMB-101 activities
| Target | Affinity (K_{i}, nM) |
|---|---|
| 5-HT_{2A} | ND (K_{i}); 2,280 (EC_{50}); ND (E_{max}) |
| 5-HT_{2B} | ND (K_{i}) >10,000 (EC_{50}); ND (E_{max}) |
| 5-HT_{2C} | ND (K_{i}); G_{q}: 16 (EC_{50}) βarr1: 75 (EC_{50}) βarr2: 77 (EC_{50}); G_{q}: ~100% (E_{max}) βarr1: 13% (E_{max}) βarr2: 21% (E_{max}) |
Notes: The smaller the value, the more avidly the drug binds to the site. All proteins are human unless otherwise specified. Refs:

BMB-101 acts as a highly selective biased agonist of the serotonin 5-HT_{2C} receptor. It has greater that 100-fold selectivity for the serotonin 5-HT_{2C} receptor over other serotonin receptors, including the serotonin 5-HT_{2A} and 5-HT_{2B} receptors. In addition, the drug shows no significant activity at other serotonin receptors. BMB-101 shows functional selectivity at the serotonin 5-HT_{2C} receptor for activation of G_{q} signaling with minimal β-arrestin recruitment. This in turn appears to minimize receptor desensitization and development of tolerance. Due to its much greater selectivity for the serotonin 5-HT_{2C} receptor, BMB-101 is not expected to possess the psychedelic effects or cardiotoxicity that have been associated with existing drugs like fenfluramine and lorcaserin at therapeutic or supratherapeutic doses. In accordance with its mechanism of action, BMB-101 produces anticonvulsant effects in animals.

The activation of serotonin 5-HT_{2C} receptors has been shown to reduce epileptic seizure activity by inhibiting T-type calcium channels (Ca_{v}3). These calcium channels facilitate high frequency burst firing in principal neurons of the subiculum. This firing pattern is upregulated following status epilepticus, with these hyperactive neurons often serving as the initiation point for seizures.

== Chemistry ==
Lumocaserin structure

The exact chemical structure of BMB-101 does not yet appear to have been disclosed. However, it is known to be a 2-phenylcyclopropylmethylamine (PCPMA) derivative and to share structural commonalities with tranylcypromine. Moreover, lumocaserin (INN), a serotonin 5-HT_{2C} receptor agonist of the PCPMA scaffold described as an anticonvulsant, has been patented by Bright Minds Biosciences-associated researchers including Alan Kozikowski and Jianjun Cheng. Lumocaserin's INN was registered in January 2026. The pharmacology and synthesis of lumocaserin have been described. Various structurally related serotonin 5-HT_{2C} receptor agonists have also been studied and described by Kozikowski and colleagues.

== Research ==
BMB-101 is under development by Bright Minds Biosciences. As of January 2026, it is in phase 2 clinical trials for the treatment of absence epilepsy, Dravet Syndrome, Lennox–Gastaut syndrome, Pitt–Hopkins syndrome, Prader–Willi syndrome, and Rett syndrome. It is or was also under development for the treatment of binge eating disorder and opioid use disorder, but no recent development has been reported for these indications.

The drug has been found to increase REM sleep time by 90% (from 56 minutes to 107 minutes) without altering total sleep duration (9.1 hours vs. 8.9 hours) in people with absence seizures in a clinical study.

== See also ==
- BMB-105
- BMB-201
- BMB-202
- Bexicaserin
- Vabicaserin
- KB-128
