= CTW0415 =

Identifiers
- IUPAC name: (2S,4R)-N-[(2S)-2,3-dihydroxypropyl]-4-phenylpiperidine-2-carboxamide
- CAS Number: 2772105-16-3
- PubChem CID: 156010013
- ChemSpider: 123962189
- ChEMBL: ChEMBL4633717

Chemical and physical data
- Formula: C_{15}H_{22}N_{2}O_{3}
- Molar mass: 278.352 g·mol^{−1}
- 3D model (JSmol): Interactive image
- SMILES: C1CN[C@@H](C[C@@H]1C2=CC=CC=C2)C(=O)NC[C@@H](CO)O
- InChI: InChI=1S/C15H22N2O3/c18-10-13(19)9-17-15(20)14-8-12(6-7-16-14)11-4-2-1-3-5-11/h1-5,12-14,16,18-19H,6-10H2,(H,17,20)/t12-,13+,14+/m1/s1; Key:OQMSTMCQUFBTSL-RDBSUJKOSA-N

CTW0415 is an experimental drug from the piperidine family, which acts as a selective positive allosteric modulator of the 5-HT_{2C} receptor, with higher potency than older drugs such as VA012. Structure-activity relationship studies showed that small variations to chain length and side chain substitution could lead to preferential binding for either 5-HT_{2C} or the related 5-HT_{2A} receptor, which subsequently led to the discovery of the related 5-HT_{2A} selective positive allosteric modulator CTW0404.
