= WAY-629 =

Names
- IUPAC name 1,2,3,4,8,9,10,11-Octahydro[1,4]diazepino[6,7,1-jk]carbazole

Identifiers
CAS Number	57756-44-2
3D model (JSmol)	Interactive image
ChEBI	CHEBI:92969
ChEMBL	ChEMBL258465
ChemSpider	5037189
PubChem CID	6604933
UNII	S3TQZ8FAS2
CompTox Dashboard (EPA)	DTXSID4042591 DTXSID0043890, DTXSID4042591
- InChI: InChI=1S/C15H18N2/c1-2-7-14-12(5-1)13-6-3-4-11-10-16-8-9-17(14)15(11)13/h3-4,6,16H,1-2,5,7-10H2 Key: OIGHTPDWPMLMGT-UHFFFAOYSA-N; InChI=1/C15H18N2/c1-2-7-14-12(5-1)13-6-3-4-11-10-16-8-9-17(14)15(11)13/h3-4,6,16H,1-2,5,7-10H2 Key: OIGHTPDWPMLMGT-UHFFFAOYAM
- SMILES: C1CCC2=C(C1)C3=CC=CC4=C3N2CCNC4

Properties
Chemical formula	C_{15}H_{18}N_{2}
Molar mass	226.32 g mol^{−1}
- Except where otherwise noted, data are given for materials in their standard state (at 25 °C [77 °F], 100 kPa). Infobox references

WAY-629 is a 5-HT_{2C} agonist that reduces feeding behavior when administered to rats. It was used as a starting point for developing more potent and selective 5-HT_{2C} agonists aimed at treating obesity.
