= 2C-B-PP =

Chemical compound

Clinical data
- Other names: 2C-B-PP
- Drug class: Serotonin receptor modulator; Serotonergic psychedelic; Hallucinogen
- ATC code: None

Legal status
- Legal status: In general unscheduled

Identifiers
- IUPAC name: 1-(2,5-dimethoxy-4-bromophenyl)piperazine
- CAS Number: 100939-87-5
- PubChem CID: 4738744
- ChemSpider: 3925965
- UNII: 9AF4JQU2FM
- ChEMBL: ChEMBL348140

Chemical and physical data
- Formula: C_{12}H_{17}BrN_{2}O_{2}
- Molar mass: 301.184 g·mol^{−1}
- 3D model (JSmol): Interactive image
- SMILES: COC1=CC(=C(C=C1N2CCNCC2)OC)Br
- InChI: InChI=1S/C12H17BrN2O2/c1-16-11-8-10(12(17-2)7-9(11)13)15-5-3-14-4-6-15/h7-8,14H,3-6H2,1-2H3; Key:JLAQUWGWRNMYGA-UHFFFAOYSA-N

2C-B-PP, also known as 2,5-dimethoxy-4-bromophenylpiperazine, is a psychedelic drug of the phenylpiperazine family. It acts as an agonist at serotonin receptors, and in studies on rats substituted for DOM with around 10-fold lower potency but similar rates of stimulus-appropriate responding at the highest dose.

== See also ==
- 2C-B-BZP
- 2C-B-3PIP
- 2C-B-aminorex
- 2C-B-morpholine
- 3-Chloro-4-fluorophenylpiperazine
- CPD-1
- ORG-12962
- Quipazine
- Substituted piperazine
