= Herman van Praag =

Dutch psychiatrist

- Born: Herman Meïr van Praag; 17 October 1929 (age 96); Schiedam, the Netherlands
- Occupation: Psychiatrist

Academic background
- Education: Leiden University, Utrecht University
- Thesis: Een kritisch onderzoek naar de betekenis van monoamineoxydase-remming als therapeutisch principe bij de behandeling van depressies (1962)
- Doctoral advisor: Henricus Cornelius Rümke

Academic work
- Institutions: University of Groningen, Utrecht University, Albert Einstein College of Medicine, Maastricht University
- Main interests: Biological psychiatry

Herman Meïr van Praag (born 17 October 1929) is a Dutch psychiatrist. He was a professor of psychiatry at the University of Groningen, Utrecht University, Albert Einstein College of Medicine and Maastricht University. Van Praag is considered the founder of biological psychiatry in the Netherlands. After his retirement, he has written extensively on religiosity.

== Life ==
=== Early life ===
Van Praag was born on 17 October 1929 in Schiedam. Van Praag is Jewish. His grandparents on both sides were among the first Zionists in the Netherlands, while his parents were non-religious. During the German occupation of the Netherlands his father, an engineer and jurist for the government was fired. Van Praag himself was taken by the Ordnungspolizei from his primary school in 1942. Between 1942 and 1945 he imprisoned in camp Barneveld and later in Westerbork transit camp and Theresienstadt concentration camp. Together with his parents and sister he survived the war. He returned from Theresienstadt two months after the end of the war and immediately applied to attend the third year program of the Hogere Burgerschool, to which he was admitted even though he had missed three years of education.

=== Career ===
Upon completion of his secondary education he studied medicine at Leiden University. After his compulsory military service he performed his doctoral research at the Dijkzigt hospital, where he later became Chef de clinique of the psychiatry department. In the late 1950s he studied neurology, with a minor in psychiatry. He was impressed by the introduction of monoamine oxidase inhibitor and continued his studies in psychiatry. He obtained his doctorate in medicine at Utrecht University in 1962 under professor Henricus Cornelius Rümke with a thesis titled: "Een kritisch onderzoek naar de betekenis van monoamineoxydase-remming als therapeutisch principe bij de behandeling van depressies".

Between 1968 and 1970 he was a lector of biological psychiatry at the University of Groningen. In the latter year he was named professor of psychiatry at the same university, with a teaching assignment in biological psychiatry. He was the first professor of biological psychiatry in the Netherlands. During his time in Groningen he was founder of an institute for biological psychiatric research, which was the first in Europe. He would remain a professor at Groningen until 1978. During the anti-psychiatry-movement of the 1970s van Praag faced criticism from students and others who were opposed to biological psychiatry and psychiatric medication, which even lead to threats and police protection. Van Praag was professor of psychiatry at Utrecht University between 1978 and 1982. His move to Utrecht was criticized by students sympathetic with the anti-psychiatry movement and van Praag in turn dedicated his inaugural lecture to a critique of anti-psychiatry. In 1982 he moved to New York City where he became a professor of psychiatry at Montefiore Medical Center and Albert Einstein College of Medicine. He worked there until 1992. During this period he re-organized psychiatric care in The Bronx. He was a professor of psychiatry at Maastricht University between 1993 and his retirement in 1997.

Van Praag is considered the founder of biological psychiatry in the Netherlands. He is known for his criticism of diagnostic systems within psychiatry and arguing for a more functional diagnosis. Van Praag has also worked on the search for biological markers for psychiatric syndromes. He was one of the earliest researchers into 5-Hydroxyindoleacetic acid of cerebrospinal fluid of depressed patients. Even after his official retirement, van Praag in 2011 once again criticized the way of diagnostics within psychiatry via the Diagnostic and Statistical Manual of Mental Disorders and argued for modernization by way of a functional diagnosis.

In 1965 van Praag received the Ramaer medal for psychiatry of the Nederlandse Vereniging voor Psychiatrie en Neurologie. Van Praag was made Knight in the Order of the Netherlands Lion in 1990. He was elected a member of the Royal Netherlands Academy of Arts and Sciences in 1993. In 2007 he was named an honorary member of the European College of Neuropsychopharmacology.

In 2011 the book 'God, religie en ons brein. In gesprek met psychiater Herman van Praag' was published by Dutch journalist and writer Tjerk de Reus (1971), on life, opinions and academic works of Herman M. van Praag, based on in-depth interviews during 2010-2011.

== Personal life ==
As of 2018, van Praag was married for over 60 years, the couple had four children. He is close friends with neurobiologist Dick Swaab although the two disagree fundamentally on the role of the brain versus the totality of the human being.

Van Praag was not raised religiously, he considers himself a Liberal Jew. Since the end of World War II he has worn a Star of David on his wrist. After his retirement, he has written extensively on psychiatry, religion, and religiosity, including several books. He has argued for more interest of psychiatrists in religiosity.
