= ORG-12962 =

Chemical compound

Clinical data
- Other names: ORG12962
- Routes of administration: Unknown
- Drug class: Serotonin 5-HT_{2} receptor agonist; Serotonin 5-HT_{2C} receptor agonist; Serotonin 5-HT_{2A} receptor agonist
- ATC code: None

Legal status
- Legal status: In general: uncontrolled

Identifiers
- IUPAC name: 1-(5-trifluoromethyl-6-chloropyridin-2-yl)piperazine
- CAS Number: 210821-63-9
- PubChem CID: 9796408
- IUPHAR/BPS: 170
- ChemSpider: 7972174
- UNII: PZ5RGN8MR8
- ChEMBL: ChEMBL506999
- CompTox Dashboard (EPA): DTXSID70430870

Chemical and physical data
- Formula: C_{10}H_{11}ClF_{3}N_{3}
- Molar mass: 265.66 g·mol^{−1}
- 3D model (JSmol): Interactive image
- SMILES: C2CNCCN2c(nc1Cl)ccc1C(F)(F)F
- InChI: InChI=1S/C10H11ClF3N3/c11-9-7(10(12,13)14)1-2-8(16-9)17-5-3-15-4-6-17/h1-2,15H,3-6H2; Key:QZYYPQAYSFBKPW-UHFFFAOYSA-N

ORG-12962 is a serotonin 5-HT_{2} receptor agonist of the pyridinylpiperazine family which was under development for the treatment of major depressive disorder but was never marketed.

It acts preferentially as a partial agonist of the serotonin 5-HT_{2C} receptor (K_{i} = 12 nM; EC_{50} = 97.7 nM; E_{max} = 62%). However, to a lesser extent, it is also a partial agonist of the serotonin 5-HT_{2A} receptor (K_{i} = 65 nM; EC_{50} = 417 nM; E_{max} = 54%) and of the serotonin 5-HT_{2B} receptor (EC_{50} = 525 nM; E_{max} = 41%). In addition, ORG-12962 shows affinity for other serotonin receptors, such as the serotonin 5-HT_{1B} receptor (K_{i} = 100 nM) and to a much lesser extent the serotonin 5-HT_{1A} receptor (K_{i} = 2,500 nM).

In addition to depression, it was studied as a potential anxiolytic, but was discontinued from human trials after tests in a public speaking challenge showed that its anti-anxiety effects were accompanied by side effects such as dizziness and a "spacey" feeling, which were attributed as being possibly due to poor selectivity in vivo over the hallucinogenic serotonin 5-HT_{2A} receptor.

ORG-12962 was first described in the scientific literature by 1995. It was developed by Organon. The drug reached phase 2 clinical trials for depression prior to the discontinuation of its development.

== See also ==
- Substituted piperazine
- 2C-B-PP
- 2,3-Dichlorophenylpiperazine
- 3-Chloro-4-fluorophenylpiperazine
- CPD-1
- ORG-37684
- Quipazine
