= 6-Chloro-5-ethoxy-N-(pyridin-2-yl)indoline-1-carboxamide =

Chemical compound

Identifiers
- IUPAC name: 6-Chloro-5-ethoxy-N-(pyridin-2-yl)indoline-1-carboxamide
- CAS Number: 1384929-25-2
- PubChem CID: 57515146
- ChemSpider: 129325127
- UNII: 2BY259EY9C
- CompTox Dashboard (EPA): DTXSID901030338

Chemical and physical data
- Formula: C_{16}H_{16}ClN_{3}O_{2}
- Molar mass: 317.77 g·mol^{−1}
- 3D model (JSmol): Interactive image
- SMILES: c3cccnc3NC(=O)N(c1cc2Cl)CCc1cc2OCC
- InChI: InChI=1S/C16H16ClN3O2/c1-2-22-14-9-11-6-8-20(13(11)10-12(14)17)16(21)19-15-5-3-4-7-18-15/h3-5,7,9-10H,2,6,8H2,1H3,(H,18,19,21); Key:OCFLVVOXCVJFTI-UHFFFAOYSA-N

6-Chloro-5-ethoxy-N-(pyridin-2-yl)indoline-1-carboxamide (CEPC) is a drug which acts as a potent and selective antagonist for the serotonin 5-HT_{2C} receptor. In animal studies it was found to potentiate the conditioned place preference induced by low-dose amphetamine, demonstrating that 5-HT_{2C}-mediated disinhibition of dopamine release can cause interactions with dopaminergic drugs.

== See also ==
- RS-102,221
- SB-242,084
- SCQ1
