= Caribbean Programme for Economic Competitiveness =

The Caribbean Regional Human Resource Development Program for Economic Competitiveness known as (CPEC) for short is a programme funded by the Canadian International Development Agency (CIDA). The agency is a recent manifestation of historical good-relations and cooperation between the Commonwealth-Caribbean and the nation of Canada.

== Affiliated areas ==
- OECS - Tourism, Agriculture, Financial Services and Construction.
- Guyana - Agro-processing, Forestry and Wood Products, Other Manufacturing and Tourism
- Jamaica - Tourism, Agriculture and Agro-Industry.
- Regional - Tourism, Agriculture and Financial Services
