= PRX-00933 =

Clinical data
- Other names: PRX00933; PRX-933; PRX933; ALT-933; ALT933; BVT933; GW-876167; GW876167; GW-876,167
- Routes of administration: Oral
- Drug class: Serotonin 5-HT_{2C} receptor agonist; Appetite suppressant; Anti-obesity drug
- ATC code: None

Identifiers
- IUPAC name: 2-[(2R)-2-methylpiperazin-1-yl]-3-(2-pyridin-3-yloxyethoxy)pyrazine
- CAS Number: 313658-33-2
- PubChem CID: 9818332
- ChemSpider: 7994082
- UNII: QD3T8L7E4H

Chemical and physical data
- Formula: C_{16}H_{21}N_{5}O_{2}
- Molar mass: 315.377 g·mol^{−1}
- 3D model (JSmol): Interactive image
- SMILES: C[C@@H]1CNCCN1C2=NC=CN=C2OCCOC3=CN=CC=C3
- InChI: InChI=1S/C16H21N5O2/c1-13-11-18-7-8-21(13)15-16(20-6-5-19-15)23-10-9-22-14-3-2-4-17-12-14/h2-6,12-13,18H,7-11H2,1H3/t13-/m1/s1; Key:DNZVDSXVCHUOFL-CYBMUJFWSA-N

PRX-00933, also known as ALT-933, BVT-933, and GW-876167, is a serotonin 5-HT_{2C} receptor agonist which was under development for the treatment of obesity and glaucoma but was never marketed. It is taken orally. The drug was found to reduce appetite and promote weight loss in both animals and humans. PRX-00933 was originated by Biovitrum and was under development by Proximagen, Altacor, and GlaxoSmithKline. It reached phase 2 clinical trials for obesity by 2002 prior to the discontinuation of its development. No recent development was reported by 2012.

== See also ==
- Serotonin 5-HT_{2C} receptor agonist
