= RS-102221 =

Chemical compound

Clinical data
- Other names: RS-102,221; 8-[5-(2,4-Dimethoxy-5-(4-trifluoromethylphenylsulphonamido)phenyl -5-oxopentyl]-1,3,8-triazaspiro[4.5]decane-2,4-dione

Identifiers
- IUPAC name: N-{5-[5-(2,4-dioxo-1,3,8-triazaspiro[4.5]dec-8-yl)pentanoyl] -2,4-dimethoxyphenyl}-4-(trifluoromethyl)benzenesulfonamide
- CAS Number: 185376-97-0
- PubChem CID: 3693566
- IUPHAR/BPS: 187
- ChemSpider: 2925610
- UNII: 48D22QR8GY
- ChEMBL: ChEMBL88402
- CompTox Dashboard (EPA): DTXSID801028164

Chemical and physical data
- Formula: C_{27}H_{33}F_{3}N_{4}O_{7}S
- Molar mass: 614.64 g·mol^{−1}
- 3D model (JSmol): Interactive image
- SMILES: c4cc(C(F)(F)F)ccc4S(=O)(=O)Nc(c(OC)cc2OC)cc2C(=O)CCCCN(CC3)CCC13NC(=O)NC1=O
- InChI: InChI=1S/C27H31F3N4O7S/c1-40-22-16-23(41-2)20(33-42(38,39)18-8-6-17(7-9-18)27(28,29)30)15-19(22)21(35)5-3-4-12-34-13-10-26(11-14-34)24(36)31-25(37)32-26/h6-9,15-16,33H,3-5,10-14H2,1-2H3,(H2,31,32,36,37); Key:HZZZZODVDSHQRG-UHFFFAOYSA-N

RS-102221 is a drug developed by Hoffmann–La Roche, which was one of the first compounds discovered that acts as a potent and selective antagonist at the serotonin 5-HT_{2C} receptor, with around 100× selectivity over the closely related 5-HT_{2A} and 5-HT_{2B} receptors. It has anxiolytic effects in animal studies, increases the effectiveness of SSRI antidepressants, and shows a complex interaction with cocaine, increasing some effects but decreasing others, reflecting a role for the 5-HT_{2C} receptor in regulation of the dopamine signalling system in the brain.

== See also ==
- CEPC
- SB-242084
- Hydantoin
