= SB-242084 =

Chemical compound

Clinical data
- Other names: SB242084; SB-242,084
- Drug class: Serotonin 5-HT_{2C} receptor antagonist
- ATC code: None

Identifiers
- IUPAC name: 6-chloro-5-methyl-N-{6-[(2-methylpyridin-3-yl)oxy]pyridin-3-yl}indoline-1-carboxamide
- CAS Number: 181632-25-7
- PubChem CID: 3644637
- IUPHAR/BPS: 193
- ChemSpider: 2878619
- UNII: 9FEE9A2U4Z
- ChEMBL: ChEMBL14563
- CompTox Dashboard (EPA): DTXSID401017151 DTXSID70394600, DTXSID401017151

Chemical and physical data
- Formula: C_{21}H_{19}ClN_{4}O_{2}
- Molar mass: 394.86 g·mol^{−1}
- 3D model (JSmol): Interactive image
- SMILES: Cc1cc2CCN(c2cc1Cl)C(=O)Nc(cc4)cnc4Oc3cccnc3C
- InChI: InChI=1S/C21H19ClN4O2/c1-13-10-15-7-9-26(18(15)11-17(13)22)21(27)25-16-5-6-20(24-12-16)28-19-4-3-8-23-14(19)2/h3-6,8,10-12H,7,9H2,1-2H3,(H,25,27); Key:GIUZEIJUFOPTMR-UHFFFAOYSA-N

SB-242084 is a selective serotonin 5-HT_{2C} receptor antagonist which is used in scientific research.

It has anxiolytic effects-like effects in rodents, and enhances dopamine signalling in the limbic system, as well as having complex effects on the dopamine release produced by cocaine, increasing it in some brain regions but reducing it in others. In animal studies, SB-242084 produced stimulant-type activity and reinforcing effects, somewhat similar to but much weaker than cocaine or amphetamines. It is self-administered by monkeys. The drug has been found to increase dopamine levels in the striatum in rats and in the nucleus accumbens in monkeys by about 200%. It potentiates the hyperlocomotion induced by amphetamine, methylphenidate, cocaine, MDMA, fenfluramine, nicotine, and morphine in rodents. Local injection of SB-242084 into the nucleus accumbens augments MDMA-induced conditioned place preference (CPP) and dopamine release in this area in rodents.

The drug has been shown to increase the effectiveness of the selective serotonin reuptake inhibitor (SSRI) class of antidepressants in animals, and may also reduce their side effects. SSRIs acutely reduce social interaction in rodents, thought to be an anxiogenic response, and this effect can be reversed by SB-242084. SB-242084 has been found to reverse the anxiogenic effects of meta-chlorophenylpiperazine (mCPP) in rodents as well. In addition, SB-242084 reverses the acute hypolocomotion induced by SSRIs.

SB-242084 was under development by GlaxoSmithKline for the treatment of anxiety disorders in the late 1990s. However, its development was abandoned. The drug reached the research or discovery phase of development prior to its discontinuation.

== See also ==
- List of investigational anxiety disorder drugs
- CEPC
- RS-102221
- SB-243213
