= 5-HT2C receptor =

Serotonin receptor protein distributed mainly in the choroid plexus

HTR2C
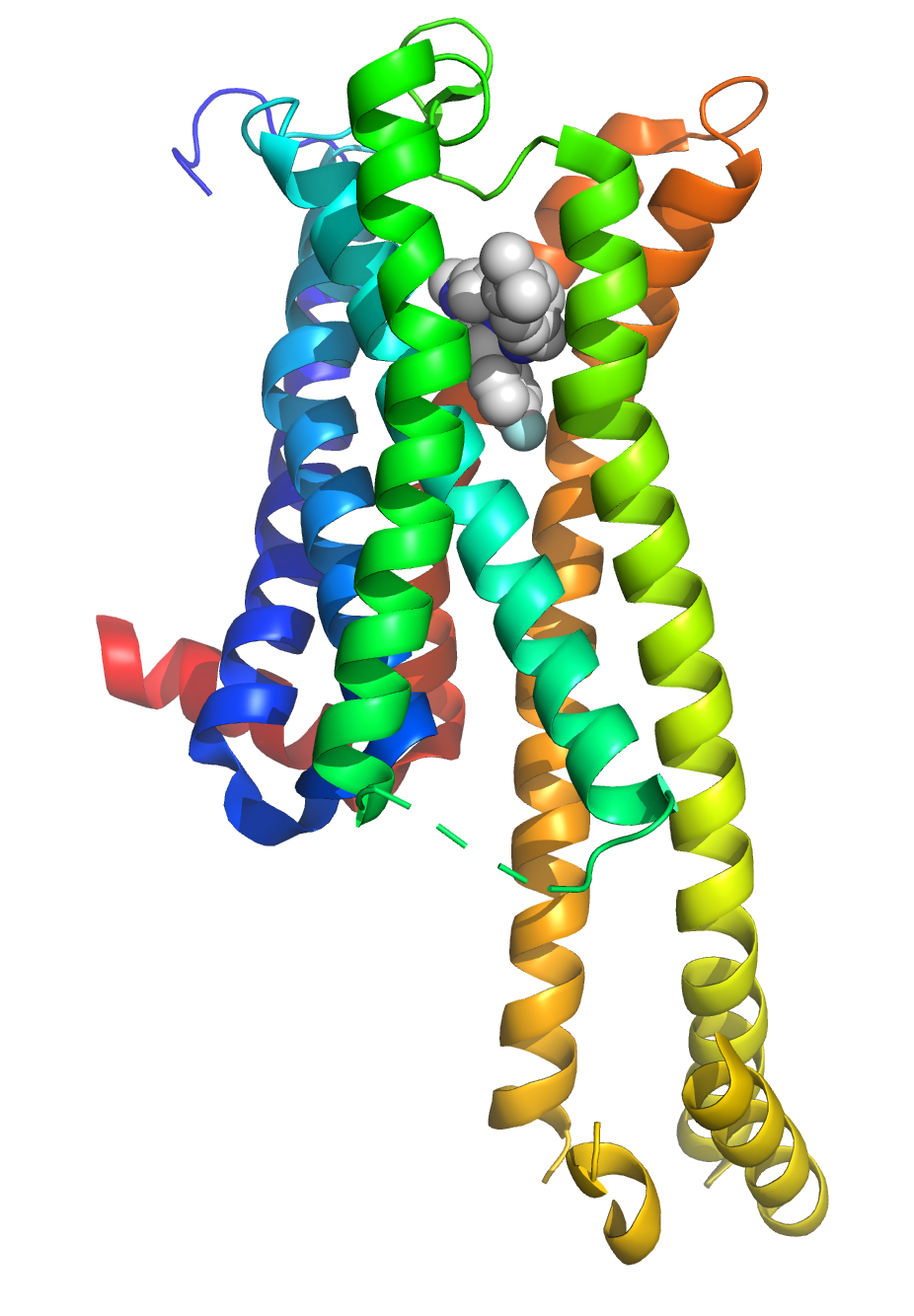

Identifiers
- Aliases: HTR2C, 5-HT2C, 5-5HTR1C, 5-HT1C, 5-HT2C receptor, 5-hydroxytryptamine receptor 2C
- External IDs: OMIM: 312861; MGI: 96281; GeneCards: HTR2C

Gene location (Mouse)
Chr.	X chromosome (mouse)
Band	X F2|X 68.46 cM	Start	145,745,509 bp
Band	X F2|X 68.46 cM	End	145,980,273 bp
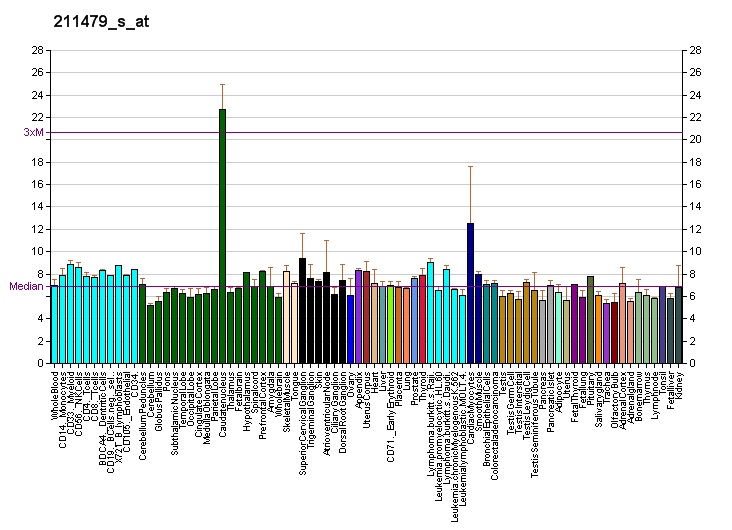

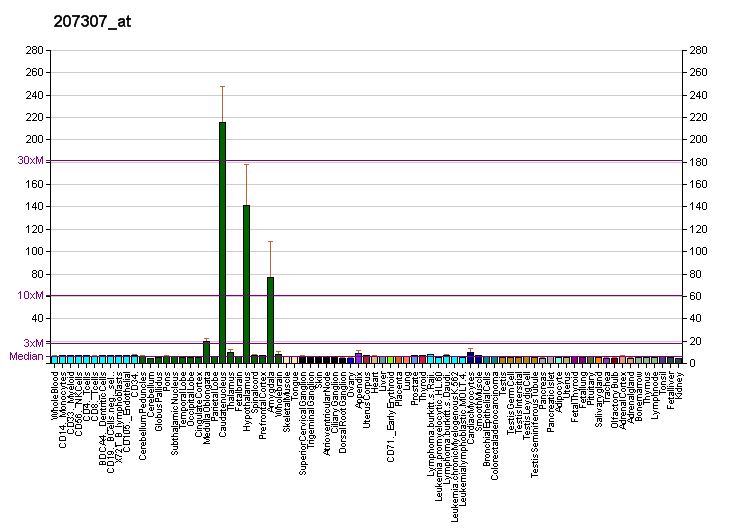
RNA expression pattern
Bgee	Human / Mouse (ortholog); Top expressed in: external globus pallidus; superior vestibular nucleus; nucleus accumbens; caudate nucleus; middle frontal gyrus; hypothalamus; putamen; Region I of hippocampus proper; endothelial cell; entorhinal cortex / Top expressed in: Epithelium of choroid plexus; medial dorsal nucleus; lateral septal nucleus; nucleus accumbens; anterior amygdaloid area; lateral hypothalamus; dorsal tegmental nucleus; dorsomedial hypothalamic nucleus; medial vestibular nucleus; olfactory tubercle; More reference expression data
BioGPS	More reference expression data
Gene ontology
Molecular function	1-(4-iodo-2,5-dimethoxyphenyl)propan-2-amine binding; G protein-coupled receptor activity; signal transducer activity; G protein-coupled serotonin receptor activity; Gq/11-coupled serotonin receptor activity; serotonin binding; neurotransmitter receptor activity
Cellular component	integral component of membrane; membrane; plasma membrane; integral component of plasma membrane; intracellular anatomical structure; dendrite
Biological process	release of sequestered calcium ion into cytosol; positive regulation of cytosolic calcium ion concentration involved in phospholipase C-activating G protein-coupled signaling pathway; phospholipase C-activating serotonin receptor signaling pathway; locomotory behavior; positive regulation of phosphatidylinositol biosynthetic process; cellular calcium ion homeostasis; behavioral fear response; regulation of nervous system process; cGMP biosynthetic process; phospholipase C-activating G protein-coupled receptor signaling pathway; serotonin receptor signaling pathway; feeding behavior; positive regulation of ERK1 and ERK2 cascade; regulation of corticotropin-releasing hormone secretion; regulation of appetite; positive regulation of fat cell differentiation; signal transduction; chemical synaptic transmission; G protein-coupled receptor signaling pathway; animal behavior; cGMP-mediated signaling; G protein-coupled receptor signaling pathway, coupled to cyclic nucleotide second messenger
Sources:Amigo / QuickGO
Orthologs
Databases	NCBI: entry; OMA: entry
Species	Human	Mouse
Entrez	3358	15560
Ensembl	ENSG00000147246	ENSMUSG00000041380
UniProt	P28335	P34968
RefSeq (mRNA)	NM_001256761; NM_000868; NM_001256760	NM_008312
RefSeq (protein)	NP_000859; NP_001243689; NP_001243690	NP_032338
Location (UCSC)	n/a	Chr X: 145.75 – 145.98 Mb
PubMed search
- Wikidata
View/Edit Human	View/Edit Mouse

The 5-HT_{2C} receptor is a subtype of the 5-HT2 receptor that binds the endogenous neurotransmitter serotonin (5-hydroxytryptamine, 5-HT). Like all 5-HT2 receptors, it is a G protein-coupled receptor (GPCR) that is coupled to G_{q}/G_{11} and mediates excitatory neurotransmission. HTR2C denotes the human gene encoding for the receptor, that in humans is located on the X chromosome. As males have one copy of the gene and females have one of the two copies of the gene repressed, polymorphisms at this receptor can affect the two sexes to differing extent.

== Structure ==
At the cell surface the receptor exists as a homodimer. The crystal structure has been known since 2018.

== Distribution ==
5-HT_{2C} receptors are located mainly in the choroid plexus, and in rats is also found in many other brain regions in high concentrations, including parts of the hippocampus, anterior olfactory nucleus, substantia nigra, several brainstem nuclei, amygdala, subthalamic nucleus and lateral habenula. 5-HT_{2C} receptors are also found on epithelial cells lining the ventricles.

== Function ==
The 5-HT_{2C} receptor is one of the many binding sites for serotonin. Activation of this receptor by serotonin inhibits dopamine and norepinephrine release in certain areas of the brain.

5-HT_{2C} receptors are claimed to significantly regulate mood, anxiety, feeding, and reproductive behavior, and might also be related to executive function. 5-HT_{2C} receptors regulate dopamine release in the striatum, prefrontal cortex, nucleus accumbens, hippocampus, hypothalamus, and amygdala, among others.

Research indicates that some suicide victims have an abnormally high number of 5-HT_{2C} receptors in the prefrontal cortex. Agomelatine, which is a 5-HT_{2C} and 5-HT_{2B} antagonist as well as a MT_{1} and MT_{2} agonist, is an effective antidepressant. It has been found to act, through its 5-HT2C receptor antagonism, as a norepinephrine-dopamine disinhibitor because antagonism of 5-HT_{2C} results in an increase of dopamine and norepinephrine activity in the frontal cortex.

Conversely, many atypical antipsychotic and antidepressants act as 5-HT2C receptor antagonists; like loxapine–an antipsychotic structurally related to clozapine and its metabolite amoxapine. Amoxapine is an antidepressant in its own right, and acts as a 5-HT2C receptor antagonist. Fluoxetine acts as a direct 5-HT_{2C} antagonist in addition to inhibiting serotonin reuptake, however, the clinical significance of this action is variable. Several tetracyclic antidepressants, including mirtazapine and mianserin, as well as certain tricyclic antidepressants such as amitriptyline and clomipramine are potent 5-HT_{2C} antagonists; this action may contribute to their efficacy. An overactivity of 5-HT_{2C} receptors may contribute to depressive and anxiety symptoms in a certain population of patients. Activation of 5-HT_{2C} by serotonin is responsible for many of the negative side effects of SSRI and SNRI medications, such as sertraline, paroxetine, venlafaxine, and others. Some of the initial anxiety caused by SSRIs is due to excessive signalling at 5-HT_{2C} receptors. 5-HT_{2C} receptors exhibit constitutive activity in vivo, and may retain the ability to influence neurotransmission in the absence of ligand occupancy. Thus, 5-HT_{2C} receptors do not require binding by a ligand (serotonin) in order to exhibit influence on neurotransmission. Inverse agonists may be required to fully extinguish 5-HT_{2C} constitutive activity, and may prove useful in the treatment of 5-HT_{2C}-mediated conditions in the absence of typical serotonin activity. In addition to the evidence for a role of 5-HT_{2C} receptor stimulation in depressive symptoms there also is evidence that activation of 5-HT_{2C} receptors may have beneficial effects upon certain aspects of depression, one group of researchers found that direct stimulation of 5-HT_{2C} receptors with a 5-HT_{2C} agonist reduced cognitive deficits in mice with a TPH2 loss-of-function mutation.

5-HT_{2C} receptors mediate the release and increase of extracellular dopamine in response to many drugs, including caffeine, nicotine, amphetamine, morphine, cocaine, and others. 5-HT_{2C} antagonism increases dopamine release in response to reinforcing drugs, and many dopaminergic stimuli. Feeding, social interaction, and sexual activity all release dopamine subject to inhibition of 5-HT_{2C}. Increased 5-HT_{2C} expression reduces dopamine release in both the presence and absence of stimuli.

Conditions that increase cytokine levels in the human body may have potential to raise 5-HT_{2C} gene expression in the brain. This could possibly comprise a link between viral infections and associated depression. Cytokine therapy has been shown to increase 5-HT_{2C} gene expression, resulting in increased activity of 5-HT_{2C} receptors in the brain.

== Endocrinology ==
Serotonin is involved in basal and stress-induced regulation of hypothalamus and pituitary gland hormones such as prolactin, adrenocorticotropic hormone (ACTH), vasopressin and oxytocin, mainly via actions of receptor subtypes 5-HT_{2A} and 5-HT_{2C}. Therefore, the 5-HT_{2C} receptor is a significant modulator of the hypothalamic–pituitary–adrenal axis (HPA axis). The HPA axis is the main controller of acute sympathetic stress responses related to fight-or-flight response. Prolonged activation and disturbances of the HPA axis contribute to depressive and anxiety symptoms seen in many psychopathological conditions.

Stimulation of 5-HT_{2C} receptors leads to increase of corticotropin releasing hormone (CRH) and vasopressin mRNA in the paraventricular nucleus and proopiomelanocortin in the anterior pituitary lobe. In rats, restraint stress (which can produce depressive symptoms if being chronic) induces secretion of prolactin, ACTH, vasopressin and oxytocin which is partially mediated via 5-HT_{2C} receptor. Responses during such conditions as dehydration or haemorrhage causes the release of oxytocin via serotonergic response that is partly mediated by 5-HT_{2C}. In addition, peripheral release of vasopressin involves a serotonergic response which is partially mediated via 5-HT_{2C}.

Expression of the 5-HT_{2C} receptor in the CNS is modulated by female sex hormones estradiol and progesterone. Combination of the hormones decreases the receptor concentration in the ventral hippocampus in rats and could thus affect mood.

== Genetics ==
Many human polymorphisms have been identified influencing the expression of 5-HT_{2C}. Significant correlations are suggested, specifically in relation to psychiatric disorders such as depression, OCD, and anxiety-related conditions. Polymorphisms also correlate with susceptibility to a number of conditions including substance use disorders and obesity. There are indications that the alternative splicing of the 5-HT_{2C} receptor is regulated by a snoRNA called SNORD115, the deletion of which is associated with Prader–Willi syndrome. As the human gene is located in the X chromosome, males have only one copy of the gene whereas women have two, meaning that mutations in the gene affect the phenotype of men even when the allele would be recessive in nature. As women have two copies of the gene, but only one allele is expressed in each cell, they are a mosaic for polymorphisms, meaning that one genetic variant may be prevalent in one tissue and another variant will be prevalent in a different tissue (as with all other x-linked genetic variations).

== Ligands ==
=== Agonists ===
- A-372,159
- AL-38022A
- Aporphines and noraporphines (e.g., MQ02-439, nornuciferine, asimilobine, 11-chloroasimilobine, 11-methoxyasimilobine, (S)-glaucine)
- ATHX-105
- Bexicaserin
- BMB-101
- BMB-105
- BMB-201
- Centhaquine
- CP-132,484
- CP-809,101
- CPD-1
- DLX-2270
- Fenfluramine
- KB-128
- Lisuride
- Lorcaserin
- LY03020
- Mesulergine
- MK-212
- Naphthylisopropylamine
- Norfenfluramine
- NU-1223
- ORG-12962
- ORG-37684
- Oxaflozane
- PF-04479745
- PNU-22394
- PNU-181731
- PRX-00933
- Psychedelics
  - Lysergamides (e.g., LSD)
  - Phenethylamines (e.g., mescaline, 2C-B, DOI, DOM, MDA, 25I-NBOMe)
  - Phenylpiperazines (e.g., mCPP, TFMPP)
  - Tryptamines (e.g., DMT, psilocin, psilocybin, 5-MeO-DMT, bufotenin, CPI-CG-8)
- Ro60-0175
- Vabicaserin
- VR-1065
- WAY-629
- WAY-161,503
- WAY-163,909
- WAY-261240
- YM-348

=== Peripherally selective agonists ===
- IHCH-8110

=== Antagonists ===
- Agomelatine
- CEPC
- Clozapine
- Cyclobenzaprine
- Eltoprazine
- Etoperidone
- Flibanserin
- Fluoxetine
- FR260010
- Methysergide
- Mianserin
- Mirtazapine
- Nefazodone
- Norfluoxetine
- O-Desmethyltramadol
- Olanzapine
- Promethazine
- Puerarin
- RS-102,221
- SB-200,646
- SB-221,284
- SB-228,357
- SB-242,084
- SDZ SER-082
- Tedatioxetine
- Tramadol
- Trazodone

==== Peripherally selective antagonists ====
- BW-501C67
- Sarpogrelate
- Xylamidine

=== Inverse agonists ===
- Antidepressants
  - Tricyclics (Amitriptyline and Nortriptyline most notably)
  - Tetracyclics (Mirtazapine, Mianserin, Amoxapine, etc.)
- Antihistamines (Cyproheptadine, Hydroxyzine, Latrepirdine, etc.)
- Antipsychotics
  - Typicals (Chlorpromazine, Fluphenazine, Loxapine, Thioridazine, etc.)
  - Atypicals (Clozapine, Olanzapine, Risperidone, Ziprasidone, etc.)
- Cinanserin
- Deramciclane
- Ketanserin
- LY-53,857
- Metergoline
- Methiothepin
- Pizotifen
- Ritanserin
- S-32212
- SB-206,553
- SB-228,357
- SB-242,084
- SB-243,213
- SB-247853
- Tenilapine

=== Positive allosteric modulators ===
Exogenous PAMs of the serotonin 5-HT_{2C} receptor include:

- CYD-1-79
- CTW-0415
- VA012

== Interactions ==
The 5-HT_{2C} receptor has been shown to interact with MPDZ.

== RNA editing ==
5HT2CR pre-mRNA can be the subject of RNA editing. It is the only serotonin receptor as well as the only member of the large family of 7 transmembrane receptors (7TMRs) known to be edited. Different levels of editing result in a variety of effects on receptor function.

=== Type ===
The type of RNA editing that occurs in the pre-mRNA of the 5HT2CR is Adenosine to Inosine (A to I) editing.

A to I RNA editing is catalyzed by a family of adenosine deaminases acting on RNA (ADARs) that specifically recognize adenosines within double-stranded regions of pre-mRNAs and deaminate them to inosine. Inosines are recognised as guanosine by the cells translational machinery. There are three members of the ADAR family ADARs 1–3 with ADAR1 and ADAR2 being the only enzymatically active members. ADAR3 is thought to have a regulatory role in the brain. ADAR1 and ADAR2 are widely expressed in tissues while ADAR3 is restricted to the brain. The double stranded regions of RNA are formed by base-pairing between residues in the close to region of the editing site with residues usually in a neighboring intron but can be an exonic sequence. The region that base pairs with the editing region is known as an Editing Complementary Sequence (ECS).

ADARs bind interact directly with the dsRNA substrate via their double stranded RNA binding domains. If an editing site occurs within a coding sequence, it can result in a codon change. This can lead to translation of a protein isoform due to a change in its primary protein structure. Therefore, editing can also alter protein function. A to I editing occurs in a non coding RNA sequences such as introns, untranslated regions (UTRs), LINEs, SINEs ( especially Alu repeats) The function of A to I editing in these regions is thought to involve creation of splice sites and retention of RNAs in the nucleus amongst others.

=== Location ===
Editing occurs in 5 different closely located sites within exon 5, which corresponds to the second intracellular loop of the final protein. The sites are known as A, B, C′ (previously called E), C and D, and are predicted to occur within amino acid positions 156, 158 and 160. Several codon changes can occur due to A-to-I editing at these sites. Thirty-two different mRNA variants can occur leading to 24 different protein isoforms.

1. An Isoleucine to Valine (I/V) at amino acid position 157,161.
2. An Isoleucine to a Methionine(I/M) at amino acid position 157
3. An Aspartate to a Serine (N/S)at 159
4. An Aspartate to Asparagine(N/D) at 159
5. An Asparagine to a Glycine(N/G) at 159.

These codon changes which can occur due to A to I editing at these sites can lead to a maximum of 32 different mRNA variants leading to 24 different protein isoforms. The number of protein isoforms is less than 32 since some amino acids are encoded by more than one codon. Another editing site, site F has also been located in the exon complementary sequence (ECS) of intron 5. The ECS required for formation of double stranded RNA structure is found within intron 5.

=== Conservation ===
RNA editing of this receptor occurs at 4 locations in the rat. Editing also occurs in the mouse. The initial demonstration of RNA editing in rat. The predominant isoform in rat brain is VNV which differs from the most common type found in humans. The editing complementary sequence is known to be conserved across Mammalia.

=== Regulation ===
The 5-HT_{2c} receptor is the only serotonin receptor edited despite its close sequence similarities to other family members. 5HT2CR is different due to possessing an imperfect inverted repeat at the end of exon 5 and the beginning of intron 5 allowing formation of an RNA duplex producing the dsRNA required by ADARs for editing. Disruption of this inverted repeat was demonstrated to cease all editing. The different 5HT2CR mRNA isoforms are expressed differently throughout the brain, yet not all of the 24 have been detected perhaps due to tissue specific expression or low frequency editing of a particular type. Those isoforms that are not expressed at all or at a very low frequency are linked by being edited only at site C' and/or site B but not at site A. Some examples of differences in frequency of editing and site edited in different parts of the human brain of 5HT2CR include low frequency of editing in cerebellum and nearly all editing is at site D while in the hippocampus editing frequency is higher with site A being the main editing site. Site C' is only found edited in the thalamus. The most common isoform in human brain is the VSV isoform.

Mice knock out and other studies have been used to determine which ADAR enzyme are involved in editing. Editing at A and B sites has been demonstrated to be due to ADAR1 editing. Also since ADAR1 expression is increased in response to the presence of interferon α, it was also observed that editing at A and B sites was also increased because of this. C' and D sites require ADAR2 and editing is decreased by the presence of ADAR1 with editing of C' site only observed in ADAR1 double knock out mice. The C site has been shown to be mainly edited by ADAR2 but in presence of upregulated expression of ADAR1, there was an increase in editing of this site and the enzymes presence can also result in limited editing in ADAR 2 knock out mice. This demonstrates that there must be some form interaction between the two A to I editing enzymes. Also such interactions and tissue specific expression of ADARs interaction may explain the variety in editing patterns in different regions of the brain.

==== Consequences ====
Second, the editing pattern controls the amount of the 5-HT2CR mRNA that leads to the expression of full-length protein through the modulation of alternative splice site selection 76,77. Among three alternative splice donor sites (GU1 to GU3; Fig. 4C), GU2 is the only site that forms the mature mRNA to produce the functional, full-length 5-HT2CR protein. Unedited pre-mRNAs tend to be spliced at the GU1 site, resulting in the truncated, non-functional protein if translated 76,77. However, most pre-mRNAs edited at more than one position are spliced at GU2 77. Thus, when editing is inefficient, increased splicing at GU1 may act as a control mechanism to decrease biosynthesis of the 5-HT2CR-INI and thereby limit serotonin response. Third, RNA editing controls the ultimate physiological output of constitutively active receptors by affecting the cell surface expression of the 5-HT2CR. The 5-HT2CR-VGV, which displays the lowest level of constitutive activity, is fully expressed at the cell surface under basal conditions and is rapidly internalized in the presence of agonist 78; additionally, in vitro, LSD shows negligible activity with this isoform. In contrast, the 5-HT2CR-INI is constitutively internalized and accumulates in endosomes 78.

Structure

As mentioned editing results in several codon changes. The editing sites are found in the second intracellular domain of the protein which is also the receptors G protein coupling domain. Therefore, editing of these sites can affect the affinity of the receptor for G protein binding.

Function

Editing results in reduced affinity for specific G proteins which in turn affects internal signalling via second messengers (Phospholipase C signalling system). The fully edited isoform, VGV, considerably reduces 5-HT potency, G-protein coupling and agonist binding, compared to the unedited protein isoform, INI. 72–76. Most evidence for the effect of editing on function comes from downstream measurements of receptor activity, radio ligand binding and functional studies. Inhibitory effects are linked to the extent of editing. Those isoforms with a higher level of editing require higher levels of serotonin to activate the phospholipase c pathway. Unedited INI form has a greater tendency to isomerise to an active form which can more easily interact with G proteins. This indicates that RNA editing here may be a mechanism for regulating neuronal excitability by stabilising receptor signalling.

Editing is also thought to function in cell surface expression of the receptor subtype. The fully edited VGV, which has the lowest level of constitutive activity, is fully expressed at the cell surface while the non-edited INI is internalised and accumulates in endosome.

Editing is also thought to influence splicing. Three different spliced isoforms of the receptor exist. Editing regulates the amount of 5HT2CR mRNA which leads to translation of the full length protein selection of alternative splice sites. t76,77. These splice sites are termed Gu1, Gu2, GU3. Only GU2 site splicing results in translation of the full length receptor while editing at GU1 is known to result in translation of a truncated protein. This is thought to be a regulatory mechanism to decrease the amount of unedited isoform INI to limit serotonin response when editing is inefficient. Most of the pre-mRNAs which are edited are spliced at the GU2 site.

Dysregulation

Serotonin family of receptors are often linked to pathology of several human mental conditions such as Schizophrenia, anxiety, Bipolar disorder and major depression. There have been several experimental investigations into the effects of alternative editing patterns of the 5HT2CR and these conditions with a wide variability in results especially those relating to schizophrenia. Some studies have noted that there is an increase in RNA editing at site A in depressed suicide victims. E site editing was observed to be increased in individuals with major depression. In rat models this increase is also observed and can be reversed with fluoxetine with some suggestion that E site editing maybe linked to major depression.

== See also ==
- 5-HT receptor
- 5-HT_{2} receptor
- Anxiety/Aggression-Driven Depression
- Norepinephrine-dopamine disinhibitor
