= 2C-T-15 =

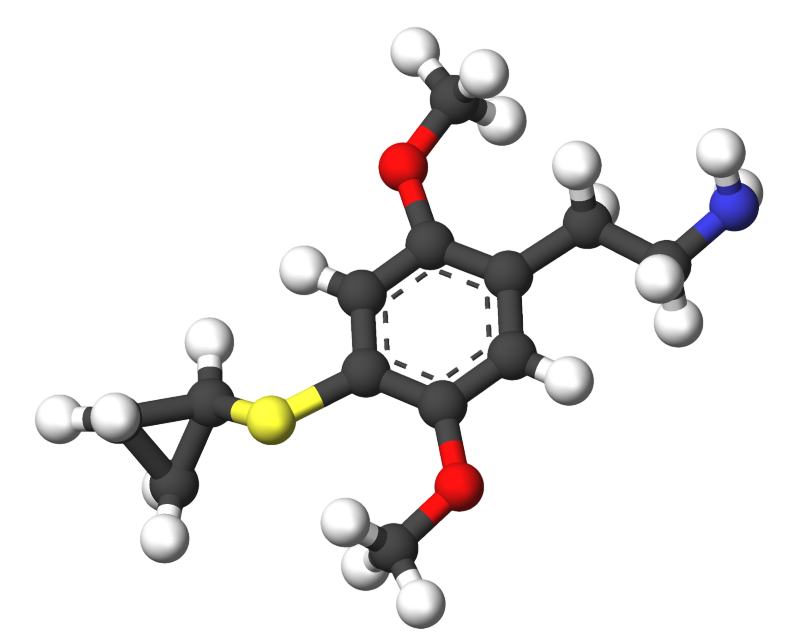

Clinical data
- Other names: 4-Cyclopropylthio-2,5-dimethoxyphenethylamine; 2,5-Dimethoxy-4-cyclopropylthiophenethylamine; Sesqui; SESQUI
- Routes of administration: Oral
- Drug class: Psychoactive drug
- ATC code: None

Pharmacokinetic data
- Duration of action: "Several hours"

Identifiers
- IUPAC name: 2-[4-(cyclopropylsulfanyl)-2,5-dimethoxyphenyl]ethan-1-amine
- CAS Number: 952006-95-0
- PubChem CID: 44719534
- ChemSpider: 21106229
- UNII: 4DC109467K
- CompTox Dashboard (EPA): DTXSID90660359

Chemical and physical data
- Formula: C_{13}H_{19}NO_{2}S
- Molar mass: 253.36 g·mol^{−1}
- 3D model (JSmol): Interactive image
- Melting point: 203.5 to 204.5 °C (398.3 to 400.1 °F)
- SMILES: COc2cc(SC1CC1)c(cc2CCN)OC
- InChI: InChI=1S/C13H19NO2S/c1-15-11-8-13(17-10-3-4-10)12(16-2)7-9(11)5-6-14/h7-8,10H,3-6,14H2,1-2H3; Key:HHAPMOUVSYQKLK-UHFFFAOYSA-N

2C-T-15, also known as 4-cyclopropylthio-2,5-dimethoxyphenethylamine or as Sesqui, is a psychoactive drug of the phenethylamine and 2C families.

== Use and effects ==
In his book PiHKAL (Phenethylamines I Have Known and Loved), Alexander Shulgin lists 2C-T-15's dose as greater than 30 mg orally and its duration as "several hours". The drug produced threshold effects and possible talkativeness at doses of 6 to 30 mg orally, but there were no other effects nor clear hallucinogenic effects. Higher doses were not tested.

== Chemistry ==
2C-T-15 is the 2 carbon homologue of Aleph-15, which has not been synthesized. The full chemical name is 2-[4-(2-cyclopropylthio)-2,5-dimethoxyphenyl]ethanamine. The drug has structural properties similar to 2C-T-2 and other drugs in the 2C-T series.

=== Synthesis ===
The chemical synthesis of 2C-T-15 has been described.

== History ==
2C-T-15 was first described in the scientific literature by Alexander Shulgin and colleagues in 1991. Subsequently, it was described in greater detail in his book PiHKAL (Phenethylamines I Have Known and Loved) that same year.

== Society and culture ==
=== Legal status ===
==== Canada ====
As of October 31, 2016, 2C-T-15 is a controlled substance (Schedule III) in Canada.

==== United Kingdom ====
2C-T-15 is a class A drug in the UK under the Misuse of Drugs act.

==== United States ====
2C-T-15 is not explicitly illegal in the USA, but possession and sales of 2C-T-15 could be prosecuted under the Federal Analog Act because of its structural similarities to 2C-T-7.

== See also ==
- 2C (psychedelics)
