= 2C-T-8 =

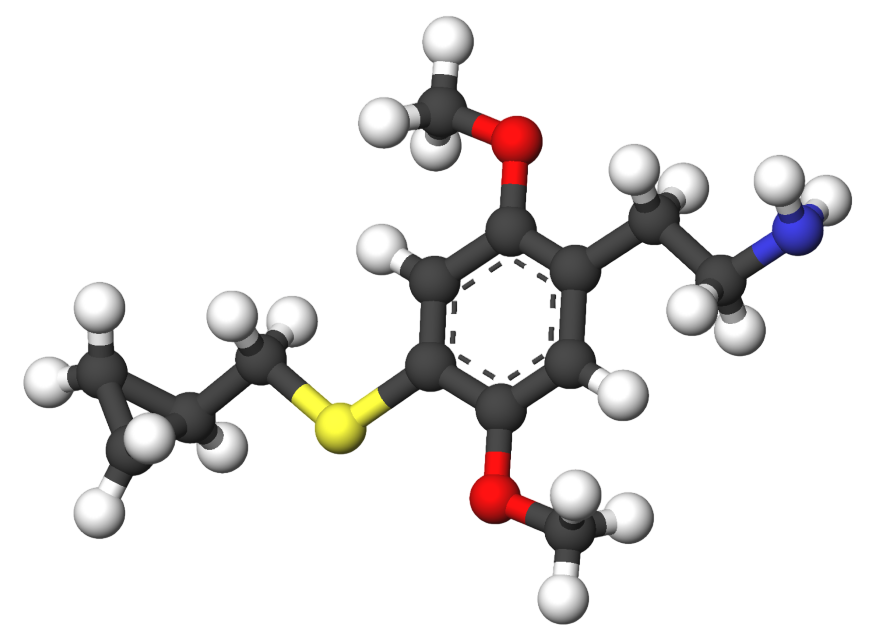

Clinical data
- Other names: 4-Cyclopropylmethylthio-2,5-dimethoxyphenethylamine; 2,5-Dimethoxy-4-cyclopropylmethylthiophenethylamine
- Routes of administration: Oral
- Drug class: Serotonergic psychedelic; Hallucinogen
- ATC code: None

Pharmacokinetic data
- Onset of action: 0.75–1.5 hours
- Duration of action: 10–15 hours

Identifiers
- IUPAC name: 2-{4-[(cyclopropylmethyl)sulfanyl]-2,5-dimethoxyphenyl}ethan-1-amine
- CAS Number: 207740-27-0
- PubChem CID: 44350055
- ChemSpider: 21106234
- UNII: 50U317Z43G
- ChEMBL: ChEMBL127995
- CompTox Dashboard (EPA): DTXSID70658375

Chemical and physical data
- Formula: C_{14}H_{21}NO_{2}S
- Molar mass: 267.39 g·mol^{−1}
- 3D model (JSmol): Interactive image
- SMILES: COc2cc(SCC1CC1)c(cc2CCN)OC
- InChI: InChI=1S/C14H21NO2S/c1-16-12-8-14(18-9-10-3-4-10)13(17-2)7-11(12)5-6-15/h7-8,10H,3-6,9,15H2,1-2H3; Key:AHMSSHCYIDBVQB-UHFFFAOYSA-N

2C-T-8, also known as 4-cyclopropylmethylthio-2,5-dimethoxyphenethylamine, is a psychedelic drug of the phenethylamine and 2C families.

== Use and effects ==
In his book PiHKAL (Phenethylamines I Have Known and Loved) and other publications, Alexander Shulgin lists 2C-T-8's dose as 30 to 50 mg orally and its duration as 10 to 15 hours. Its onset is 0.75 to 1.5 hours and is said to be smooth.

The effects of 2C-T-8 have been reported to include good or excellent feelings, high energy, it being not too stimulating, thinking changes similar to those of 2C-T-2, feeling like one's head is split in two in the sense of being in two different universes at the same time, division of and discoordination of visual and spatial perceptions into two along a vertical axis, problems with boundaries such that the outside world seemed to be getting inside of one's head, feeling that parts of oneself separated uncontrollably or ran together into someone unfamiliar, feeling that the eyes were working independently of each other, opening of insights and understanding, feeling completely out of one's conscious body, feelings of awakening, introspection or internal journey, self-interaction, and personal development.

Other effects included negative feelings, discomfort, self-doubt, paranoia, hypersensitivity to light, noise, and motion, sinus pain, nausea and vomiting, vertigo especially with closed eyes or laying down, sleep disturbances, and after-effects like a buzzing in the head, an uncertain balance, and feeling out of it for a few days to a week. According to Shulgin, 2C-T-8 reports were mixed, with as many negatives as there were positives. Some reports stated that it was "a good one" and that it produced "one of the most remarkable experiences I have ever had", whereas another report stated that it caused "not a crisis experience, but one of extreme and prolonged discomfort". The drug is said to have an unpleasant smell and taste.

== Chemistry ==
The full name of the chemical is 2,5-dimethoxy-4-cyclopropylmethylthiophenethylamine. The compound is reported to have a bad taste and smell.

=== Synthesis ===
The chemical synthesis of 2C-T-8 has been described.

== History ==
2C-T-8 was first described in the scientific literature by Alexander Shulgin and colleagues in 1991. Subsequently, it was described in greater detail by Shulgin in his book PiHKAL (Phenethylamines I Have Known and Loved) that same year.

== Society and culture ==
=== Legal status ===
==== Canada ====
As of October 31, 2016, 2C-T-8 is a controlled substance (Schedule III) in Canada.

==== United States ====
2C-T-8 is unscheduled and uncontrolled in the United States, but possession and sales of 2C-T-8 will probably be prosecuted under the Federal Analog Act because of its structural similarities to 2C-T-7. However, 2C-T-8, unlike many other phenethylamines has not been sold by internet retailers. In the wake of Operation Web Tryp in July 2004, the issue of possession and sales of 2C-T-8 and other similar chemicals will probably be resolved in the courtroom as will the fate of this rare but unique psychedelic.

== See also ==
- 2C (psychedelics)
