= 2C-T-30 =

Clinical data
- Other names: 2C-T-FB; 2C-T-FBu; 4-(4-Fluorobutylthio)-2,5-dimethoxyphenethylamine
- Routes of administration: Oral
- Drug class: Serotonin receptor modulator; Serotonin 5-HT_{2A} receptor agonist
- ATC code: None

Pharmacokinetic data
- Duration of action: Unknown

Identifiers
- IUPAC name: 2-[4-(4-fluorobutylsulfanyl)-2,5-dimethoxyphenyl]ethanamine
- PubChem CID: 12063263

Chemical and physical data
- Formula: C_{14}H_{22}FNO_{2}S
- Molar mass: 287.39 g·mol^{−1}
- 3D model (JSmol): Interactive image
- SMILES: COC1=CC(=C(C=C1CCN)OC)SCCCCF
- InChI: InChI=1S/C14H22FNO2S/c1-17-12-10-14(19-8-4-3-6-15)13(18-2)9-11(12)5-7-16/h9-10H,3-8,16H2,1-2H3; Key:BILSBDMCLLFSAV-UHFFFAOYSA-N

2C-T-30, also known as 2C-T-FB or as 4-(4-fluorobutylthio)-2,5-dimethoxyphenethylamine, is a serotonin receptor modulator of the phenethylamine and 2C families. It is the derivative of 2C-T in which the 4-methylthio group has been replaced with a 4-(4-fluorobutylthio) group. According to Daniel Trachsel, 2C-T-30 was not clearly active at a dose of 6 mg plus 3 mg orally and its duration and effects are unknown. However, it was said that it might have helped increase ability to concentrate on tasks. The drug is a potent partial agonist of the serotonin 5-HT_{2A} receptor and also interacts with other serotonin receptors and targets. The chemical synthesis of 2C-T-30 has been described. 2C-T-30 was first described in the scientific literature by Trachsel in 2003. It is a controlled substance in Canada under phenethylamine blanket-ban language.

== See also ==
- 2C (psychedelics)
- 2C-T-19 (2C-T-Bu)
- 2C-T-21 (2C-T-FE)
- 2C-T-28 (2C-T-FP)
- 2C-Bu
