= 2C-T-4 =

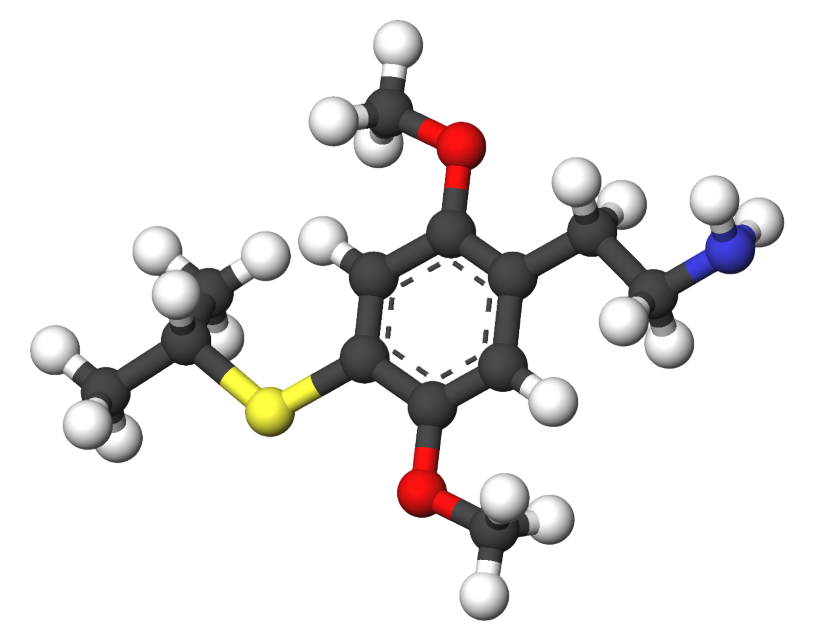

Clinical data
- Other names: 4-Isopropylthio-2,5-dimethoxyphenethylamine; 2,5-Dimethoxy-4-isopropylthiophenethylamine
- Routes of administration: Oral
- Drug class: Serotonin; 5-HT_{2} receptor agonist; Serotonergic psychedelic; Hallucinogen
- ATC code: None

Pharmacokinetic data
- Onset of action: 30 minutes–2 hours Peak: 3 hours
- Duration of action: 12–18 hours

Identifiers
- IUPAC name: 2-{2,5-Dimethoxy-4-[(propan-2-yl)sulfanyl]phenyl}ethan-1-amine
- CAS Number: 207740-25-8
- PubChem CID: 44350070
- ChemSpider: 21106232
- UNII: 558WSD71D4
- KEGG: C22735
- ChEMBL: ChEMBL338259
- CompTox Dashboard (EPA): DTXSID60893915

Chemical and physical data
- Formula: C_{13}H_{21}NO_{2}S
- Molar mass: 255.38 g·mol^{−1}
- 3D model (JSmol): Interactive image
- SMILES: CC(C)Sc1cc(OC)c(cc1OC)CCN
- InChI: InChI=1S/C13H21NO2S/c1-9(2)17-13-8-11(15-3)10(5-6-14)7-12(13)16-4/h7-9H,5-6,14H2,1-4H3; Key:HDYZSVKZKDPLDT-UHFFFAOYSA-N

2C-T-4, also known as 4-isopropylthio-2,5-dimethoxyphenethylamine, is a psychedelic drug of the phenethylamine and 2C families. It is taken orally.

2C-T-4 was first described in the scientific literature by Alexander Shulgin and colleagues in 1991. Shortly after this, Shulgin described 2C-T-17 in greater detail in his 1991 book PiHKAL (Phenethylamines I Have Known and Loved).

== Use and effects ==
In his book PiHKAL (Phenethylamines I Have Known and Loved), Alexander Shulgin lists 2C-T-4's dose as 8 to 20 mg orally and its duration as 12 to 18 hours. Its onset is 30 minutes to 2 hours and peak effects occur after 3 hours. The effects of 2C-T-4 have been described and include psychedelic visuals among others. Shulgin devoted a chapter in the first part of PiHKAL to 2C-T-4, describing an intense "plus-four" experience on the Shulgin Rating Scale with a 12 mg dose.

== Interactions ==
2C drugs are metabolized by the monoamine oxidase (MAO) enzymes MAO-A and MAO-B. Monoamine oxidase inhibitors (MAOIs) such as phenelzine, tranylcypromine, moclobemide, and selegiline may potentiate the effects of 2C drugs. This may result in overdose and serious toxicity.

== Pharmacology ==
=== Pharmacodynamics ===
2C-T-4 activities
Target	Affinity (K_{i}, nM)
5-HT_{1A}	470–916
5-HT_{1B}	ND
5-HT_{1D}	ND
5-HT_{1E}	ND
5-HT_{1F}	ND
5-HT_{2A}	27.9–54 (K_{i}); 5.5–220 (EC_{50}); 56–87% (E_{max})
5-HT_{2B}	ND (K_{i}); 63–160 (EC_{50}); 68–75% (E_{max})
5-HT_{2C}	180–295 (K_{i}); ND (EC_{50}); ND (E_{max})
5-HT_{3}	ND
5-HT_{4}	ND
5-HT_{5A}	ND
5-HT_{6}	ND
5-HT_{7}	ND
α_{1A}	11,000
α_{1B}, α_{1D}	ND
α_{2A}	130–217
α_{2B}, α_{2C}	ND
β_{1}–β_{3}	ND
D_{1}	20,000
D_{2}	16,000
D_{3}	19,000
D_{4}, D_{5}	ND
H_{1}	>25,000
H_{2}–H_{4}	ND
M_{1}–M_{5}	ND
I_{1}	ND
σ_{1}, σ_{2}	ND
TAAR1	2,337–4,500 (K_{i}) (mouse); 19–53 (K_{i}) (rat); 3,700 (EC_{50}) (mouse); 83 (EC_{50}) (rat) >30,000 (EC_{50}) (human); 51% (E_{max}) (mouse); 67% (E_{max}) (rat)
SERT	>30,000 (K_{i}); 113,000 (IC_{50}); ND (EC_{50})
NET	17,000 (K_{i}); 134,000 (IC_{50}); ND (EC_{50})
DAT	>30,000 (K_{i}); 294,000 (IC_{50}); ND (EC_{50})
Notes: The smaller the value, the more avidly the drug binds to the site. All proteins are human unless otherwise specified. Refs:

2C-T-4 acts as a serotonin 5-HT_{2} receptor agonist, including of the serotonin 5-HT_{2A} receptor. The mechanism that produces 2C-T-4's hallucinogenic effects has not been specifically established, however it is most likely to result from 5-HT_{2A} receptor activation in the brain, a mechanism of action shared by all of the hallucinogenic tryptamines and phenethylamines for which the mechanism of action is known.

== Chemistry ==
2C-T-4 is the 2-carbon homologue of Aleph-4. The full chemical name is 2-[4-(isopropylthio)-2,5-dimethoxyphenyl]-ethanamine. The drug has structural and pharmacodynamic properties similar to 2C-T-7 and 2C-T-19. A notable analogue of 2C-T-4 is the Ψ-PEA compound Ψ-2C-T-4.

=== Synthesis ===
The chemical synthesis of 2C-T-4 has been described.

=== Analogues ===
Analogues of 2C-T-4 include 2C-T, 2C-T-2, 2C-T-7, and Aleph-4, among others.

== History ==
2C-T-4 was first described in the scientific literature by Alexander Shulgin and colleagues in a journal article in 1991. Shortly thereafter, it was described in greater detail by Shulgin in his 1991 book PiHKAL (Phenethylamines I Have Known and Loved).

== Society and culture ==
=== Legal status ===
==== Canada ====
As of October 31, 2016, 2C-T-4 is a controlled substance (Schedule III) in Canada.

==== China ====
As of October 2015 2C-T-4 is a controlled substance in China.

==== Denmark ====
2C-T-4 is added to the list of Schedule B controlled substances.

==== Sweden ====
Sveriges riksdags health ministry Statens folkhälsoinstitut classified 2C-T-4 as "health hazard" under the act Lagen om förbud mot vissa hälsofarliga varor (translated Act on the Prohibition of Certain Goods Dangerous to Health) as of Jul 15, 2007, in their regulation SFS 2007:600 listed as 2,5-dimetoxi-4-isopropyltiofenetylamin (2C-T-4), making it illegal to sell or possess.

==== United States ====
As of July 9, 2012, 2C-T-4 is a Schedule I substance in the United States, under the Synthetic Drug Abuse Prevention Act of 2012.

== See also ==
- 2C (psychedelics)
- Aleph-4
