= 2C-EF =

Clinical data
- Other names: 4-(2-Fluoroethyl)-2,5-dimethoxyphenethylamine; 2,5-Dimethoxy-4-(2-fluoroethyl)phenethylamine
- Routes of administration: Oral
- Drug class: Serotonergic psychedelic; Hallucinogen
- ATC code: None

Pharmacokinetic data
- Metabolism: Deamination (MAO), demethylation, hydroxylation, acetylation, glucuronidation
- Duration of action: 12 hours

Identifiers
- IUPAC name: 2-[4-(2-fluoroethyl)-2,5-dimethoxyphenyl]ethan-1-amine
- CAS Number: 1222814-77-8
- PubChem CID: 44350106
- ChemSpider: 23206505
- ChEMBL: ChEMBL421439
- CompTox Dashboard (EPA): DTXSID201336575

Chemical and physical data
- Formula: C_{12}H_{18}FNO_{2}
- Molar mass: 227.279 g·mol^{−1}
- 3D model (JSmol): Interactive image
- SMILES: COC1=CC(=C(C=C1CCN)OC)CCF
- InChI: InChI=1S/C12H18FNO2/c1-15-11-8-10(4-6-14)12(16-2)7-9(11)3-5-13/h7-8H,3-6,14H2,1-2H3; Key:KXPMRPNOYIOXFY-UHFFFAOYSA-N

2C-EF, also known as 4-(2-fluoroethyl)-2,5-dimethoxyphenethylamine, is a psychedelic drug of the phenethylamine and 2C families. It is the 2C analogue of the DOx psychedelic DOEF. The drug is taken orally. 2C-EF was first described in the literature by Alexander Shulgin in his 1991 book PiHKAL (Phenethylamines I Have Known and Loved.

== Use and effects ==
While 2C-EF was briefly mentioned by Alexander Shulgin in his book PiHKAL (Phenethylamines I Have Known and Loved), its properties and effects were not described. Subsequently, in his book The Shulgin Index, Volume One: Psychedelic Phenethylamines and Related Compounds, Shulgin listed 2C-EF's dose range as 6 to 12 mg orally and its duration as 12 hours. This information was cited via personal communication with M. Mueller in 2006.

== Interactions ==
2C-EF is metabolized by monoamine oxidase (MAO) enzymes, including monoamine oxidase A (MAO-A) and/or monoamine oxidase B (MAO-B). Monoamine oxidase inhibitors (MAOIs) such as phenelzine, tranylcypromine, moclobemide, and selegiline may potentiate the effects of 2C-EF. This may result in overdose and serious toxicity.

== Pharmacology ==
=== Pharmacodynamics ===
2C-EF is a serotonergic psychedelic and hence presumably acts as a serotonin 5-HT_{2A} receptor agonist.

=== Pharmacokinetics ===
The metabolism of 2C-EF has been studied in vitro. It undergoes demethylation at position 2 or 5, hydroxylation, and deamination, as well as acetylation and glucuronidation. Oxidative deamination, mediated mainly by monoamine oxidase (MAO) enzymes, is the main route of metabolism for 2C-EF.

== Chemistry ==
=== Analogues ===
Analogues of 2C-EF include 2C-E, 2C-T-21, 2C-TFM, 2C-TFE, DOEF, and 2C-EF-FLY, among others.

== History ==
2C-EF was originally named by Alexander Shulgin in his 1991 book PiHKAL (Phenethylamines I Have Known and Loved). However, he only speculated about it and never actually synthesized or tested it himself. Subsequently, 2C-EF was synthesized and tested by others such as Daniel Trachsel.

== Society and culture ==
=== Legal status ===
==== Canada ====
2C-EF is a controlled substance in Canada under phenethylamine blanket-ban language.

==== United States ====
2C-EF is not an explicitly controlled substance in the United States. However, it could be considered a controlled substance under the Federal Analogue Act if intended for human consumption.

== See also ==
- 2C (psychedelics)
