= C14H21NO2S =

The molecular formula C_{14}H_{21}NO_{2}S (molar mass: 267.39 g/mol) may refer to:

- 2C-T-3
- 2C-T-8
- 2C-T-18
