= C13H21NO3S =

Molecular formula

The molecular formula C_{13}H_{21}NO_{3}S (molar mass: 271.38 g/mol) may refer to:

- 2C-T-13 (2,5-dimethoxy-4-(β-methoxyethylthio)phenethylamine)
- HOT-7
