= 2C-T-14 =

Clinical data
- Drug class: putative psychedelic
- ATC code: none

Identifiers
- IUPAC name: 2-[2,5-dimethoxy-4-(2-methylsulfanylethylsulfanyl)phenyl]ethanamine
- PubChem CID: 57474270

Chemical and physical data
- Formula: C_{13}H_{21}NO_{2}S_{2}
- Molar mass: 287.44 g·mol^{−1}
- 3D model (JSmol): Interactive image
- SMILES: CSCCSc1cc(OC)c(cc1OC)CCN
- InChI: InChI=1S/C13H21NO2S2/c1-15-11-9-13(18-7-6-17-3)12(16-2)8-10(11)4-5-14/h8-9H,4-7,14H2,1-3H3; Key:YFENVCWPZGGJQO-UHFFFAOYSA-N

2C-T-14 is a putative psychedelic from the 2C series.

== Use and effects ==
In his book PiHKAL (Phenethylamines I Have Known and Loved), Alexander Shulgin stated that, whilst there were no findings regarding the biological activity of 2C-T-14; nevertheless, he described its synthesis and suggested that it might be more "longer-lived" than 2C-T-13, although to date there has not been a single study reporting on the psychoactive activity of 2C-T-14.
