= C3H5 =

The molecular formula C_{3}H_{5} (molar mass: 41.07 g/mol, exact mass: 41.0391 u) may refer to:

- Allyl group
- Cyclopropyl group
