= C12H16F3NO3 =

The molecular formula C_{12}H_{16}F_{3}NO_{3} may refer to:

- 2C-O-22
- Trifluoroescaline
