= 2C-T =

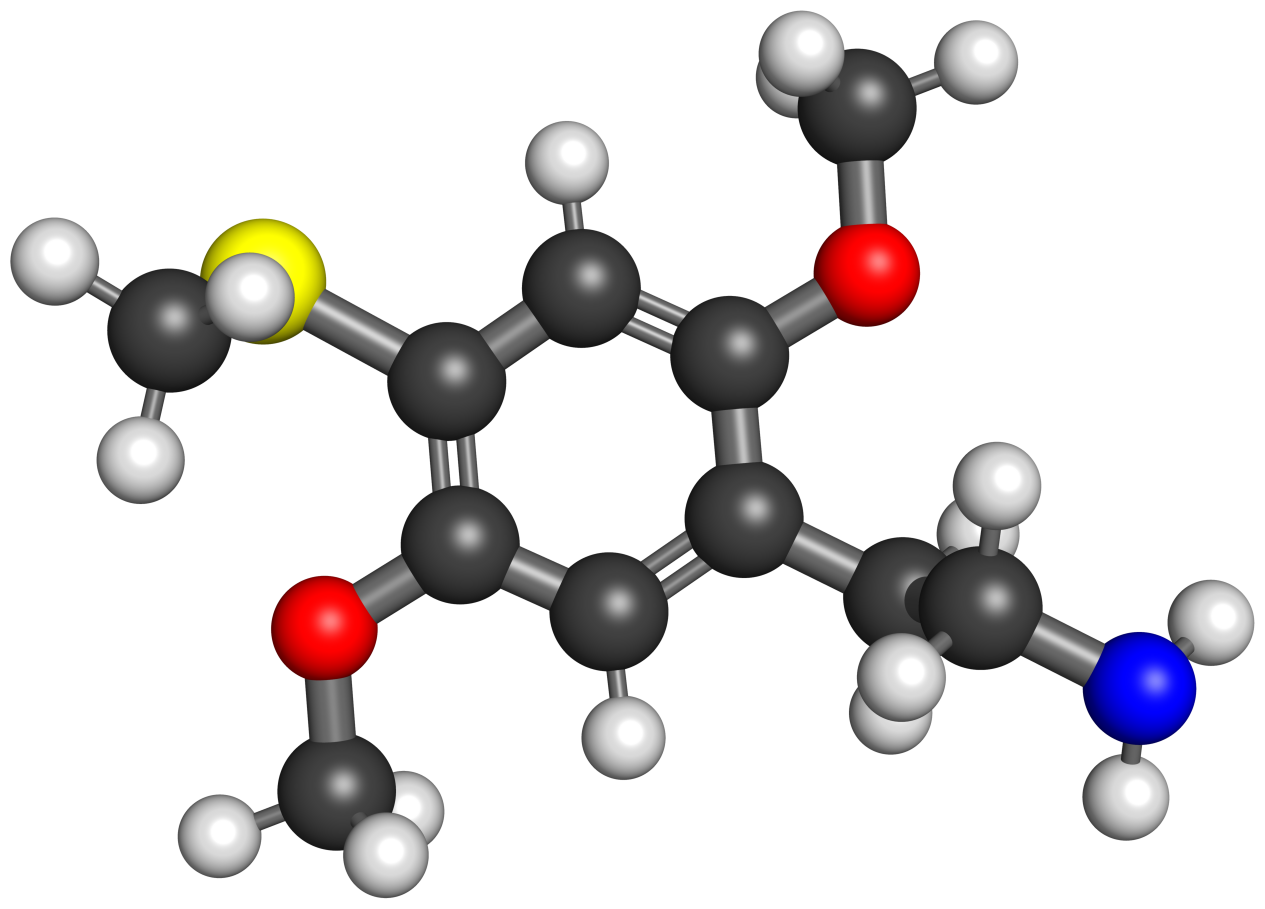

Clinical data
- Other names: 2C-T-1; 4-Methylthio-2,5-dimethoxyphenethylamine; 2,5-Dimethoxy-4-methylthiophenethylamine
- Routes of administration: Oral
- Drug class: Serotonin 5-HT_{2} receptor agonist; Serotonin 5-HT_{2A} receptor agonist; Serotonergic psychedelic; Hallucinogen
- ATC code: None

Legal status
- Legal status: In general unscheduled

Pharmacokinetic data
- Onset of action: 15 minutes
- Duration of action: 3–5 hours

Identifiers
- IUPAC name: 2-[2,5-dimethoxy-4-(methylsulfanyl)phenyl]ethan-1-amine
- CAS Number: 61638-09-3
- PubChem CID: 12315927
- ChemSpider: 10438674
- UNII: E5X0VFF7S4
- ChEMBL: ChEMBL127252
- CompTox Dashboard (EPA): DTXSID60487530
- ECHA InfoCard: 100.215.648

Chemical and physical data
- Formula: C_{11}H_{17}NO_{2}S
- Molar mass: 227.32 g·mol^{−1}
- 3D model (JSmol): Interactive image
- SMILES: COC1=CC(=C(C=C1CCN)OC)SC
- InChI: InChI=1S/C11H17NO2S/c1-13-9-7-11(15-3)10(14-2)6-8(9)4-5-12/h6-7H,4-5,12H2,1-3H3; Key:UPZMYCMLLQTYEM-UHFFFAOYSA-N

2C-T, or 2C-T-1, also known as 4-methylthio-2,5-dimethoxyphenethylamine, is a psychedelic drug of the phenethylamine and 2C families. It is taken orally. The drug has a relatively short duration and is of relatively low potency among the 2C psychedelics.

The drug acts as an agonist of the serotonin 5-HT_{2} receptors, including of the serotonin 5-HT_{2A} receptor. It is the parent compound of the 2C-T series of psychedelic phenethylamines, with derivatives such as 2C-T-2, 2C-T-4, 2C-T-7, and 2C-T-21, among many others.

2C-T was first described in the scientific literature by David E. Nichols and Alexander Shulgin in 1976. It was described in greater detail by Shulgin in his 1991 book PiHKAL (Phenethylamines I Have Known and Loved). The drug was encountered as a novel designer drug in Europe in 2023.

== Use and effects ==
In his book PiHKAL (Phenethylamines I Have Known and Loved), Alexander Shulgin lists 2C-T's dose range as 60 to 100 mg orally and its duration as 3 to 5 hours. Its onset is described as 15 minutes and its effects are said to develop "very quickly but very quietly". It is one of the shortest-acting of the 2C psychedelics, as well as among the least potent.

The effects of 2C-T have been reported to include being "really psychedelic", little or nothing in the way of psychedelic visuals, some fantasy with music, increased appreciation of poetry, things feeling "opened up" like with MDMA, being a possible MDMA substitute in this regard, feeling somewhat "generic" as a psychedelic, intellectual thinking overpowering emotions, conversational facilitation, tactile enhancement, enhanced eroticism, and stomach discomfort.

== Pharmacology ==
=== Pharmacodynamics ===
2C-T shows affinity for the serotonin 5-HT_{2} receptors and is known to act as an agonist of the serotonin 5-HT_{2A} and 5-HT_{2B} receptors. The drug shows no affinity for the monoamine transporters.

== Chemistry ==
2C-T is in a class of compounds commonly known as phenethylamines, and is the 4-methylthio analogue of 2C-O, a positional isomer of mescaline. It is also the 2C analog of Aleph. The systematic name of the chemical is 2-(2,5-dimethoxy-4-(methylthio)phenyl)ethanamine. The CAS number of 2C-T is 61638-09-3.

=== Synthesis ===
The chemical synthesis of 2C-T has been described.

=== Derivatives ===
A large number of derivatives of 2C-T have been developed and described. These include 2C-T-2, 2C-T-3, 2C-T-4, 2C-T-7, 2C-T-21, and CYB-210010 (2C-T-TFM or 2C-T-36), among many others.

== History ==
2C-T was first synthesized and studied through a collaboration between David E. Nichols and Alexander Shulgin. It was first described in the scientific literature in 1976. The drug was encountered as a novel designer drug in Europe in 2023.

== Society and culture ==
=== Legal status ===
==== Canada ====
As of October 31, 2016; 2C-T is a controlled substance (Schedule III) in Canada.

==== United States ====
2C-T is unscheduled and unregulated in the United States; however its close similarity in structure and effects to 2C-T-7 could potentially subject possession and sale of 2C-T to prosecution under the Federal Analog Act. This seems to be the tack the federal government is taking in the wake of the DEA's Operation Web Tryp. A series of court cases in the US involving the prosecution of several online vendors were commenced in 2004 and resulted in a number of convictions.

== See also ==
- 2C (psychedelics)
- Aleph (psychedelic)
