= Rifasutenizol =

Chemical compound

Identifiers
- IUPAC name: [(7S,9E,11S,12R,13S,14R,15R,16R,17S,18S,19E,21Z)-2,15,17,32-tetrahydroxy-11-methoxy-3,7,12,14,16,18,22-heptamethyl-1'-[2-(2-methyl-5-nitroimidazol-1-yl)ethyl]-6,23-dioxospiro[8,33-dioxa-24,27,29-triazapentacyclo[23.6.1.14,7.05,31.026,30]tritriaconta-1(31),2,4,9,19,21,25(32),26,29-nonaene-28,4'-piperidine]-13-yl] acetate
- CAS Number: 1001314-13-1
- PubChem CID: 136014272
- ChemSpider: 129532520
- UNII: 2G83RZK9U6
- ChEMBL: ChEMBL5172403

Chemical and physical data
- Formula: C_{48}H_{61}N_{7}O_{13}
- Molar mass: 944.052 g·mol^{−1}
- 3D model (JSmol): Interactive image
- SMILES: C[C@H]1/C=C/C=C(\C(=O)NC2=C(C3=C(C4=C(C(=C3O)C)O[C@@](C4=O)(O/C=C/[C@@H]([C@H]([C@H]([C@@H]([C@@H]([C@@H]([C@H]1O)C)O)C)OC(=O)C)C)OC)C)C5=NC6(CCN(CC6)CCN7C(=NC=C7[N+](=O)[O-])C)N=C25)O)/C
- InChI: InChI=InChI=1S/C48H61N7O13/c1-23-12-11-13-24(2)46(62)50-38-37-36(51-48(52-37)15-17-53(18-16-48)19-20-54-29(7)49-22-32(54)55(63)64)33-34(42(38)60)41(59)28(6)44-35(33)45(61)47(9,68-44)66-21-14-31(65-10)25(3)43(67-30(8)56)27(5)40(58)26(4)39(23)57/h11-14,21-23,25-27,31,39-40,43,57-60H,15-20H2,1-10H3,(H,50,62)/b12-11+,21-14+,24-13-/t23-,25+,26+,27+,31-,39-,40+,43+,47-/m0/s1; Key:OZUTUJQHZGJOKZ-AIGATTFSSA-N

Rifasutenizol is an investigational new drug developed by TenNor Therapeutics, primarily aimed at treating Helicobacter pylori infections. It is a novel multi-targeting small molecule that functions as a bacterial DNA-directed RNA polymerase inhibitor. This drug has been granted Qualified Infectious Disease Product and Fast Track designations by the U.S. FDA.
