= 2ce =

2ce may refer to:

- 2C-E, a psychedelic phenethylamine
- 0s, the year also referred to as 2 CE
