= C13H19NO2S =

The molecular formula C_{13}H_{19}NO_{2}S (molar mass: 253.360 g/mol) may refer to:

- 2C-T-15 or 2,5-dimethoxy-4-(β-cyclopropylthio)phenethylamine
- 2C-T-16
