= 2C-E =

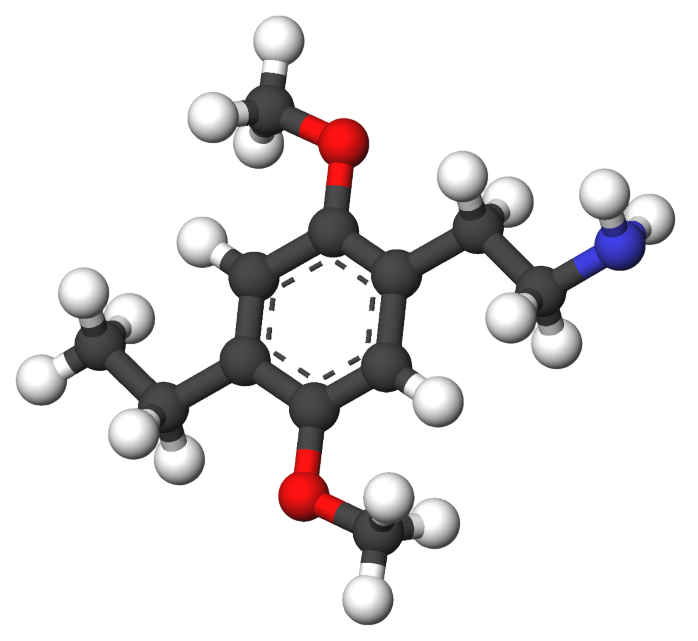

Clinical data
- Other names: 4-Ethyl-2,5-dimethoxyphenethylamine; 2,5-Dimethoxy-4-ethylphenethylamine; 2C-DOET; 2C-DOEt; Aquarust
- Routes of administration: Oral
- Drug class: Serotonin 5-HT_{2} receptor agonist; Serotonin 5-HT_{2A} receptor agonist; Serotonergic psychedelic; Hallucinogen
- ATC code: None

Legal status
- Legal status: BR: Class F2 (Prohibited psychotropics); CA: Schedule III; DE: Anlage I (Authorized scientific use only); NZ: Class C; UK: Class A; US: Schedule I

Pharmacokinetic data
- Onset of action: <2 hours
- Duration of action: 8–12 hours

Identifiers
- IUPAC name: 2-(4-ethyl-2,5-dimethoxyphenyl)ethan-1-amine
- CAS Number: 71539-34-9
- PubChem CID: 24729233
- ChemSpider: 21106222
- UNII: I190284UXX
- ChEMBL: ChEMBL124063
- CompTox Dashboard (EPA): DTXSID40221772
- ECHA InfoCard: 100.221.016

Chemical and physical data
- Formula: C_{12}H_{19}NO_{2}
- Molar mass: 209.289 g·mol^{−1}
- 3D model (JSmol): Interactive image
- Solubility in water: >70 mg/mL (20 °C)
- SMILES: COc1cc(CC)c(cc1CCN)OC
- InChI: InChI=1S/C12H19NO2/c1-4-9-7-12(15-3)10(5-6-13)8-11(9)14-2/h7-8H,4-6,13H2,1-3H3; Key:VDRGNAMREYBIHA-UHFFFAOYSA-N

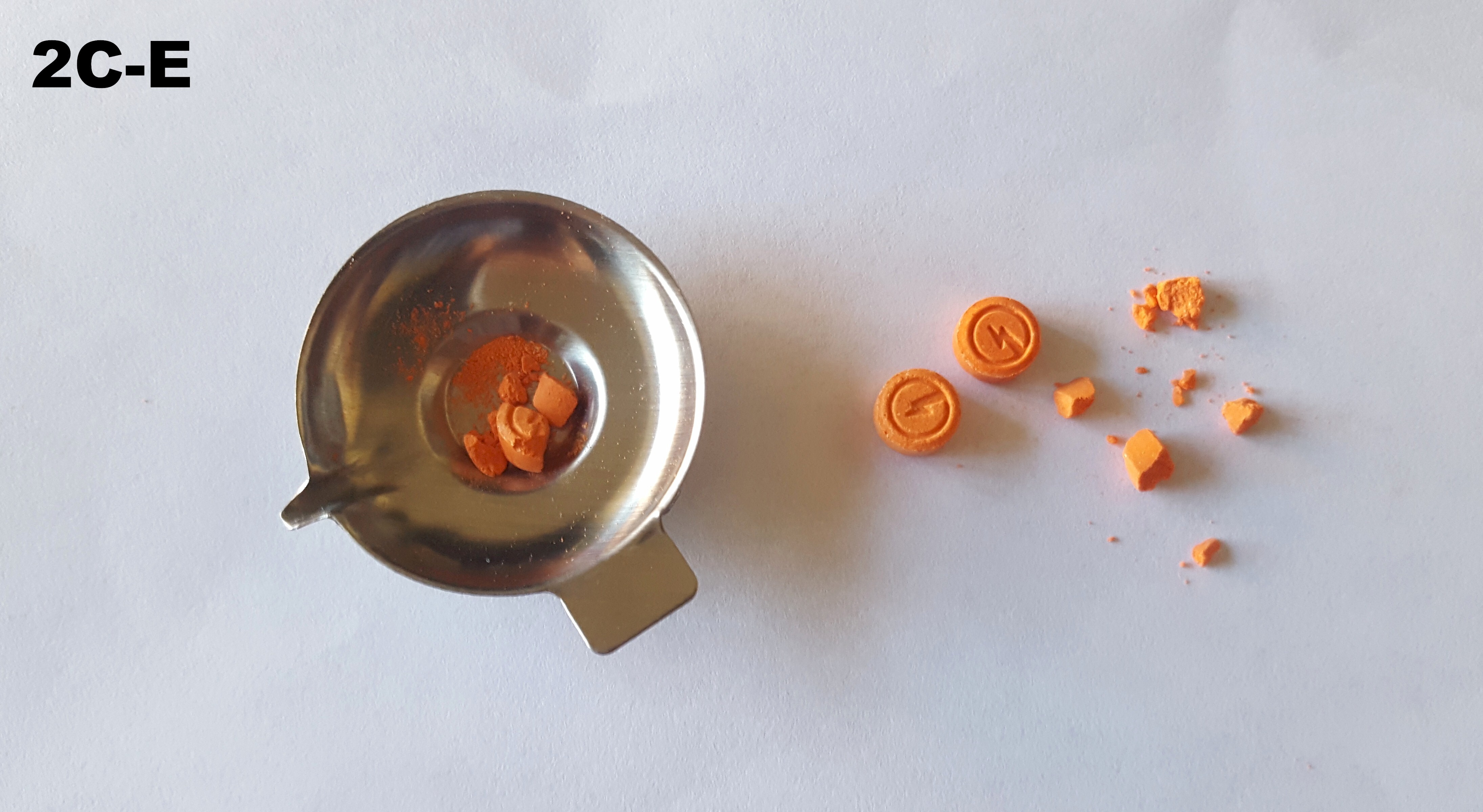
Sample of 2C-E

2C-E, also known as 4-ethyl-2,5-dimethoxyphenethylamine, is a psychedelic drug of the phenethylamine and 2C families. It is taken orally.

The drug acts as an agonist of the serotonin 5-HT_{2} receptors, including of the serotonin 5-HT_{2A} receptor.

2C-E was first synthesized by Alexander Shulgin in 1977 and was documented in his 1991 book PiHKAL (Phenethylamines I Have Known and Loved).

== Use and effects ==
In his book PiHKAL (Phenethylamines I Have Known and Loved), Alexander Shulgin lists 2C-E's dose range as 10 to 25 mg orally and its duration as 8 to 12 hours. However, in a couple of subsequent publications, he lists its dose range as only 10 to 15 mg orally. Shulgin describes 2C-E as having a steep dose–response curve, such that a small increase in dose can result in an unexpectedly large increase in effects. While a dose of 10 mg is often experienced as rich and well-tolerated, similar in character to 2C-D and 2C-B, doses of 20 to 30 mg have been described as too much and as very frightening. The onset of 2C-E was not described.

The effects of 2C-E have been reported to include color enhancement, visual changes and distortions, aesthetic enhancement, fantasy, profound and immersive psychedelic experiences, introspection, insights, dramatic recall of forgotten events, and discomfort, among others. Several short reports of the effects of 2C-E were published in the 2C-E section in PiHKAL, but were mostly described in abstract or experiential terms. However, a couple of in-depth long-form reports were also included in the first half of the book.

According to Shulgin, 2C-E is "without any question, a complete psychedelic". He also wrote the following of the drug: "Someday, the full character of 2C-E will be understood, but for the moment, let it rest as being a difficult and worth-while material. A very much worth-while material." In other publications, Shulgin described 2C-E as an "extraordinarily powerful and effective compound" and said that it is "a most extraordinary drug, evoking for many subjects a dramatic recall of forgotten events, with a remarkable ability to interpret and analyze them. The alteration of one's state of consciousness is dramatic, often quite frightening, and yet consistently allowing a complete recall." Along with a few other 2Cs like 2C-B, 2C-T-2, and 2C-T-7, 2C-E is listed in PiHKAL as one of Shulgin's "magical half-dozen".

Subsequent to Shulgin's descriptions, the effects of 2C-E have been formally clinically studied. Its effects included altered perceptions, hallucinations, and euphoria, among others. The onset was within 2 hours and its duration was more than 6 hours, though these parameters were not precisely measured.

== Side effects ==
Adverse effects of 2C-E include tachycardia, hypertension, agitation, delirium, and hallucinations. At least two deaths have been attributed to a 2C-E overdose.

== Interactions ==
2C-E is metabolized by the monoamine oxidase (MAO) enzymes MAO-A and MAO-B. Monoamine oxidase inhibitors (MAOIs) such as phenelzine, tranylcypromine, moclobemide, and selegiline may potentiate the effects of 2C-E. This may result in overdose and serious toxicity.

== Pharmacology ==
2C-E activities
Target	Affinity (K_{i}, nM)
5-HT_{1A}	307–1,190 (K_{i}) >10,000 (EC_{50}) <20% (E_{max})
5-HT_{1B}	253
5-HT_{1D}	73.2
5-HT_{1E}	626
5-HT_{1F}	ND
5-HT_{2A}	4.5–43.9 (K_{i}); 2.5–84 (EC_{50}); 40–87% (E_{max})
5-HT_{2B}	25.1 (K_{i}); 190 (EC_{50}); 66% (E_{max})
5-HT_{2C}	5.4–104 (K_{i}); 0.23–18.0 (EC_{50}); 98–106% (E_{max})
5-HT_{3}	>10,000
5-HT_{4}	ND
5-HT_{5A}	>10,000
5-HT_{6}	2,971
5-HT_{7}	426
α_{1A}	7,400–>10,000
α_{1B}	>10,000
α_{1D}	ND
α_{2A}	100–490
α_{2B}	306
α_{2C}	90.2
β_{1}	>10,000
β_{2}	ND
β_{3}	ND
D_{1}	>10,000
D_{2}	3,200–3,339
D_{3}	1,345–19,000
D_{4}	>10,000
D_{5}	>10,000
H_{1}–H_{4}	>10,000
M_{1}	>10,000
M_{2}	>10,000
M_{3}	2,557
M_{4}	>10,000
M_{5}	1,725
I_{1}	>10,000
σ_{1}	ND
σ_{2}	>10,000
TAAR1	1,200 (K_{i}) (mouse); 66–70 (K_{i}) (rat); 1,100 (EC_{50}) (mouse); 180 (EC_{50}) (rat); 6,410–>10,000 (EC_{50}) (human); 64% (E_{max}) (mouse); 72% (E_{max}) (rat)
SERT	>10,000 (K_{i}); 62,000–72,000 (IC_{50}) >100,000 (EC_{50})
NET	>10,000 (K_{i}); 26,000–89,000 (IC_{50}) >100,000 (EC_{50})
DAT	>10,000 (K_{i}); 275,000 (IC_{50}) >100,000 (EC_{50})
MAO-A	ND (IC_{50})
MAO-B	124,000 (IC_{50})
Notes: The smaller the value, the more avidly the drug binds to the site. All proteins are human unless otherwise specified. Refs:

=== Pharmacodynamics ===
2C-E acts as a serotonin 5-HT_{2} receptor agonist. Activation of the serotonin 5-HT_{2A} receptor is thought to be responsible for its psychedelic effects.

It is inactive as a monoamine releasing agent and has negligible activity as a monoamine reuptake inhibitor.

== Chemistry ==
=== Properties ===
2C-E is a colorless oil. Crystalline forms are obtained as the amine salt by reacting the free base with a mineral acid, typically hydrochloric acid (HCl).

Shulgin does not report an exact boiling point for the free base, stating only that during one synthesis the fraction boiling between 90 and 100 °C at 0.25 mmHg pressure was collected and converted to the hydrochloride salt. Shulgin reports the melting point of the hydrochloride salt as 208.5–210.5 °C.

=== Synthesis ===
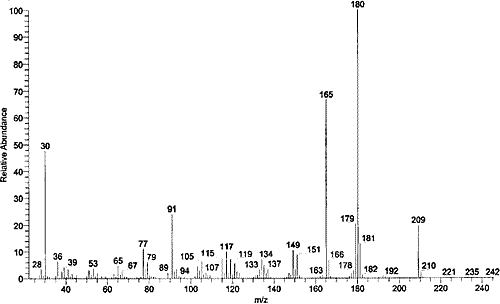
Mass spectrometer analysis: 2C-E.

The chemical synthesis of 2C-E has been described.

=== Analogues ===
Analogues of 2C-E include 2C-H (2,5-DMPEA), 2C-D, 2C-P, DOM, DOET, 2C-E-FLY, and 25E-NBOMe, among others.

== History ==
2C-E was first synthesized by Alexander Shulgin in 1977. It was first briefly mentioned in the scientific literature by Shulgin and colleagues in 1978. Then, it was described in greater detail by Shulgin in 1979. Later, the drug was described in much greater detail by Shulgin in his book PiHKAL (Phenethylamines I Have Known and Loved) in 1991.

== Society and culture ==
=== Legal status ===
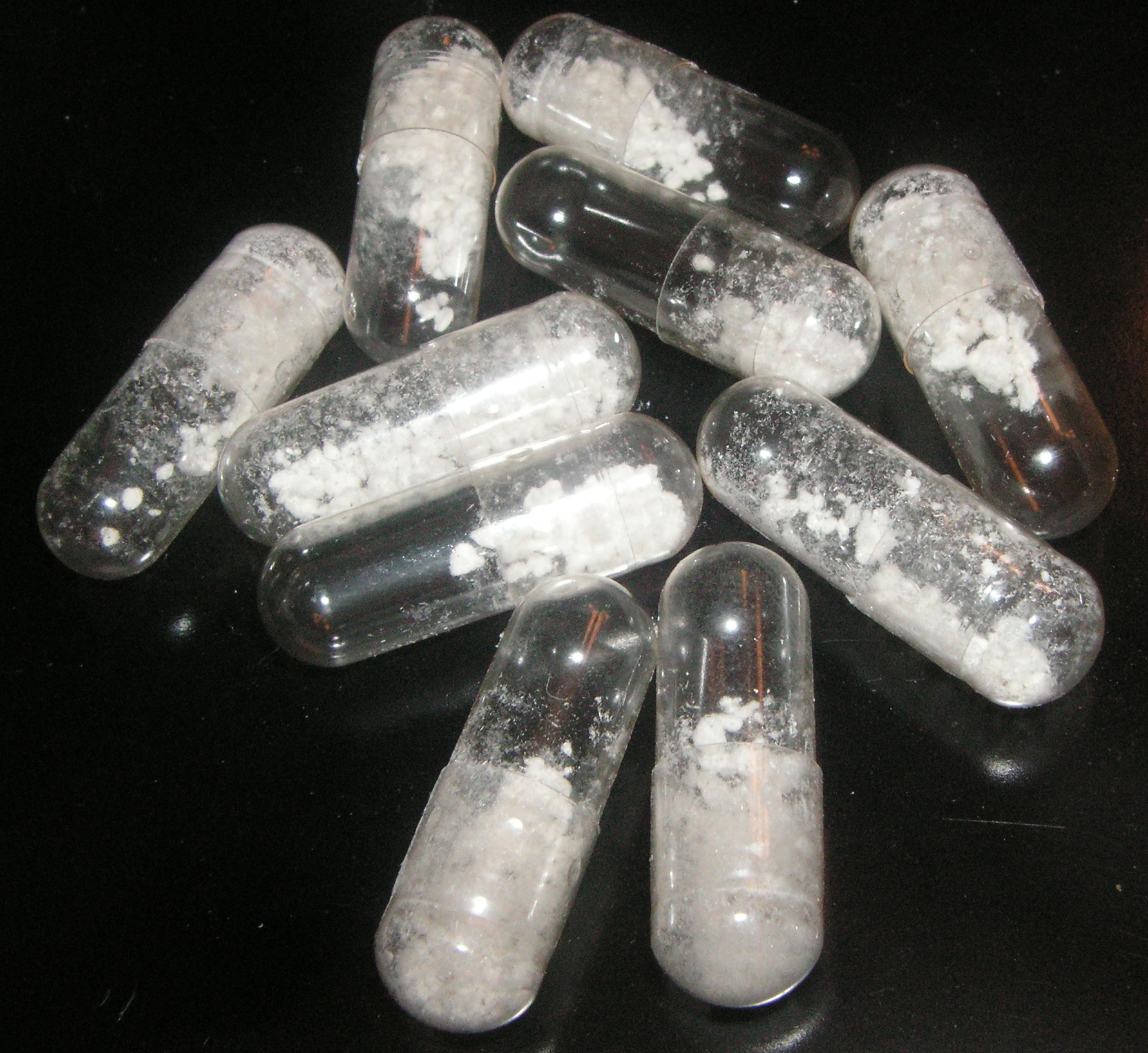
2C-E 20 mg capsules.

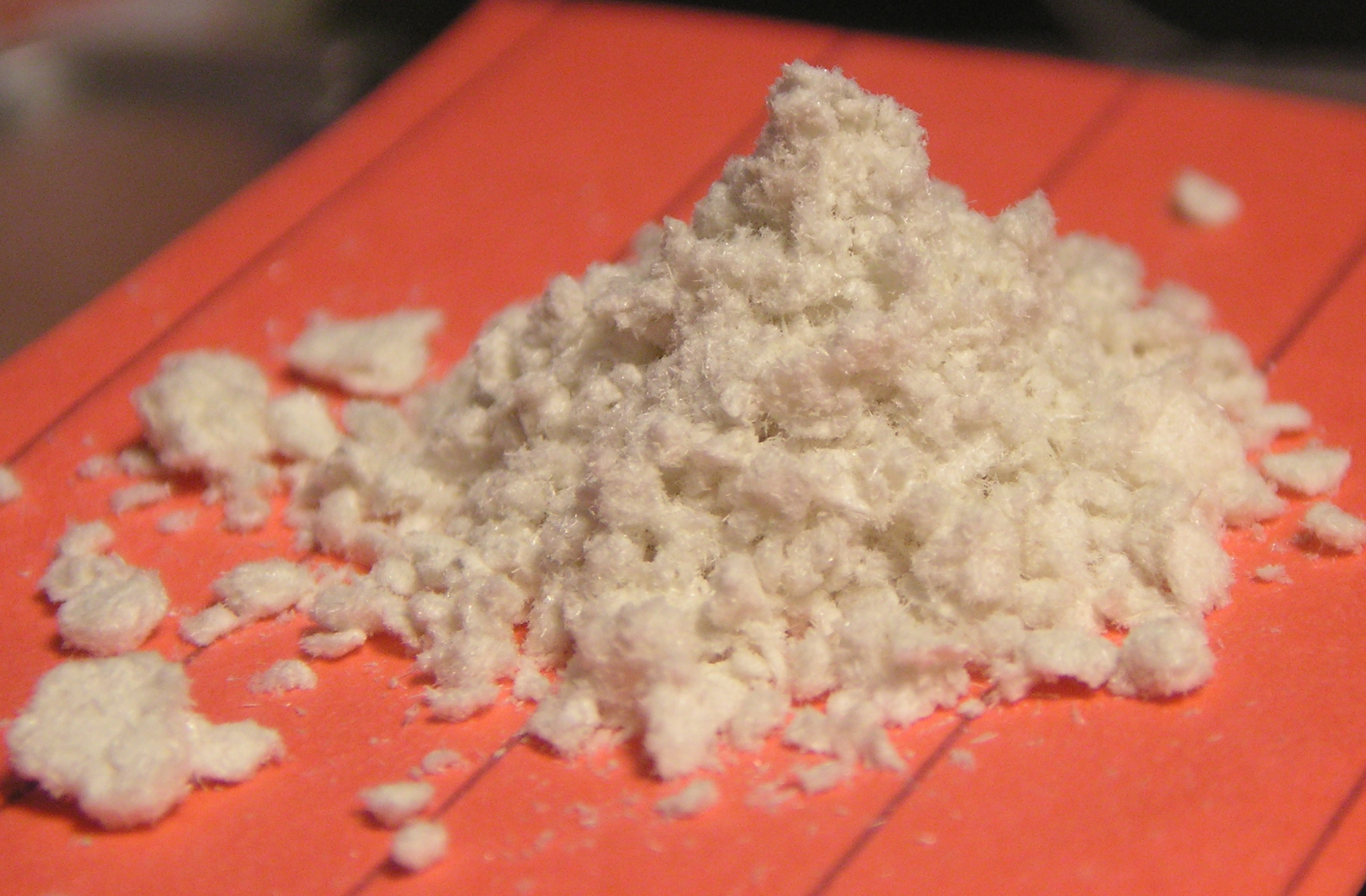
2C-E powder.

==== Australia ====
In Queensland, 2C-E was added to the 'Dangerous Drugs' list of the 'Drugs Misuse Act 1986' by the 'Drugs Misuse Amendment Act 2008'. Making it illegal to produce, supply or possess.

==== Canada ====
As of October 31, 2016, 2C-E is a controlled substance (Schedule III) in Canada.

==== China ====
As of October 2015, 2C-E is a controlled substance in China.

==== Denmark ====
2C-E is added to the list of Schedule B controlled substances.

==== Finland ====
Scheduled in "government decree on psychoactive substances banned from the consumer market".

==== Germany ====
2C-E is an Anlage I controlled drug.

==== New Zealand ====
New Zealand has a catch-all Analogues section in Schedule 3 / Class C of their drug laws that would make 2C-I, 2C-E, DOI, ephedrine, and pseudoephedrine Schedule 3 compounds in New Zealand.

==== Portugal ====
Portugal has decriminalized possession of all recreational drugs in quantities no more than a ten-day supply of that substance. However production and distribution (buying/selling) are a criminal offense.

==== Sweden ====
Sveriges riksdags health ministry Statens folkhälsoinstitut classified 2C-E as "health hazard" under the act Lagen om förbud mot vissa hälsofarliga varor (translated Act on the Prohibition of Certain Goods Dangerous to Health) as of Oct 1, 2004, in their regulation SFS 2004:696 listed as 2,5-dimetoxi-4-etylfenetylamin (2C-E), making it illegal to sell or possess.

==== United Kingdom ====
In the United Kingdom, 2C-E is a Class A controlled substance. The UK has the strictest laws in the EU on designer drugs. The Misuse Of Drugs Act was amended in 2002 to include a "catch most" clause outlawing every drug, and possible future drug, from the LSD (ergoline) and MDMA (phenethylamine) chemical families (including 2C-E). The amendment is a near verbatim quote from the books of the American biochemist Alexander Shulgin, who obtained a PhD from the University of California, Berkeley. Dr. Shulgin, a former research chemist at the Dow Chemical Company, re-discovered the synthesis for MDMA in 1976 and published the syntheses for more than 200 phenethylamine compounds of his own invention, and 55 tryptamine compounds many of which were also his own invention. The Shulgins were motivated to release the synthesis information as a way to protect the public's access to information about psychedelic compounds, a goal Alexander Shulgin has noted many times.

==== United States ====
As of July 9, 2012, in the United States 2C-E is a Schedule I substance under the Food and Drug Administration Safety and Innovation Act of 2012, making possession, distribution and manufacture illegal.

== See also ==
- 2C (psychedelics)
