= 2C-T-13 =

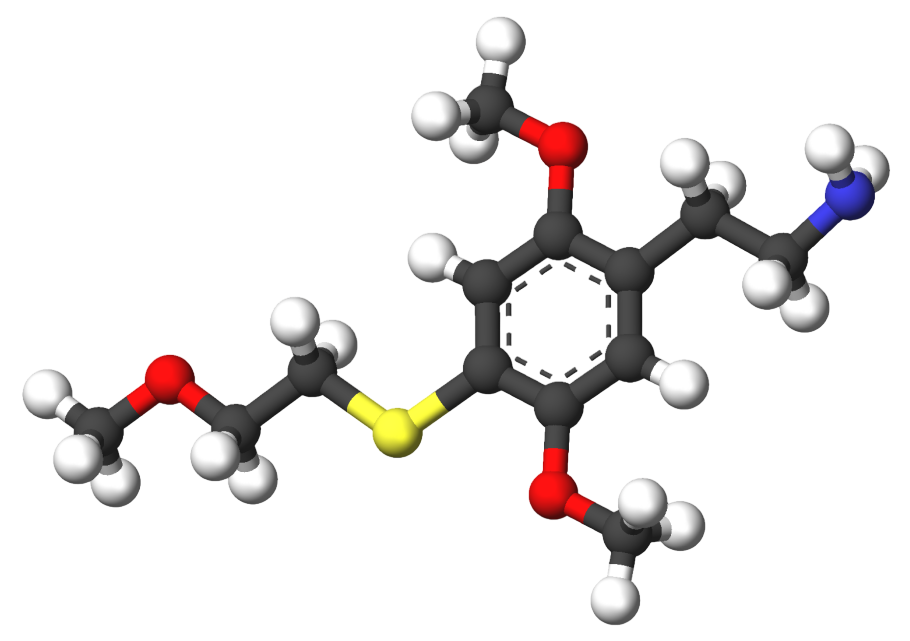

Clinical data
- Other names: 4-(2-Methoxyethylthio)-2,5-dimethoxyphenethylamine; 2,5-Dimethoxy-4-(2-methoxyethylthio)phenethylamine
- Routes of administration: Oral
- Drug class: Serotonergic psychedelic; Hallucinogen
- ATC code: None

Pharmacokinetic data
- Onset of action: 0.5 hours Peak: 1.0–1.5 hours
- Duration of action: 6–8 hours

Identifiers
- IUPAC name: 2-{2,5-dimethoxy-4-[(2-methoxyethyl)sulfanyl]phenyl}ethan-1-amine
- CAS Number: 207740-30-5
- PubChem CID: 44350108
- ChemSpider: 21106228
- UNII: SK8JCS3S9B
- ChEMBL: ChEMBL123868
- CompTox Dashboard (EPA): DTXSID10658379

Chemical and physical data
- Formula: C_{13}H_{21}NO_{3}S
- Molar mass: 271.38 g·mol^{−1}
- 3D model (JSmol): Interactive image
- SMILES: COc1cc(SCCOC)c(cc1CCN)OC
- InChI: InChI=1S/C13H21NO3S/c1-15-6-7-18-13-9-11(16-2)10(4-5-14)8-12(13)17-3/h8-9H,4-7,14H2,1-3H3; Key:PYJLRNOGMKMRTK-UHFFFAOYSA-N

2C-T-13, also known as 4-(2-methoxyethylthio)-2,5-dimethoxyphenethylamine, is a psychedelic drug of the phenethylamine and 2C families.

== Use and effects ==
In his book PiHKAL (Phenethylamines I Have Known and Loved), Alexander Shulgin lists 2C-T-13's dose as 25 to 40 mg orally and its duration as 6 to 8 hours. The onset is 0.5 hours and time to peak is about 1 to 1.5 hours.

The effects of 2C-T-13 have been reported to include closed-eye visuals such as colored visuals, patterns, and geometric shapes, open-eye visuals such as color changes, auditory changes like feeling like radio sounds are coming from outside, touches of introspection, insights or personal development such as deciding to quit smoking, no mental confusion, lightheadedness, slight dizziness, nausea, stomach discomfort, diarrhea, and no appetite loss.

== Chemistry ==
2C-T-13 has structural properties similar to mescaline and other drugs in the 2C-T series, with the most closely related compounds being 2C-T-7 and 2C-T-21.

=== Synthesis ===
The chemical synthesis of 2C-T-13 has been described.

== History ==
2C-T-13 was first described in the scientific literature by Alexander Shulgin and colleagues in 1991. Subsequently, it was described in greater detail by Shulgin in his 1991 book PiHKAL (Phenethylamines I Have Known and Loved).

== Society and culture ==
=== Legal status ===
==== Canada ====
As of October 31, 2016, 2C-T-13 is a controlled substance (Schedule III) in Canada.

==== United States ====
2C-T-13 is not scheduled in the United States, but possession and sales of 2C-T-13 could be prosecuted under the Federal Analog Act because of its structural similarities to 2C-T-7.

== See also ==
- 2C (psychedelics)
