= Βk-2C-I =

βk-2C-I

Clinical data
- Other names: bk-2C-I; β-Keto-2C-I; β-Keto-4-iodo-2,5-dimethoxyphenethylamine; 4-Iodo-2,5-dimethoxy-β-ketophenylethylamine; 4′-Iodo-2′,5′-dimethoxy-2-aminoacetophenone; 4-Iodo-2,5-dimethoxycathinone; 2,5MeO,4I-AcP
- Drug class: Serotonergic psychedelic; Hallucinogen
- ATC code: None

Identifiers
- IUPAC name: 2-amino-1-(4-iodo-2,5-dimethoxyphenyl)ethanone
- PubChem CID: 165361441
- CompTox Dashboard (EPA): DTXSID801341974

Chemical and physical data
- Formula: C_{10}H_{12}INO_{3}
- Molar mass: 321.114 g·mol^{−1}
- 3D model (JSmol): Interactive image
- SMILES: COC1=CC(=C(C=C1C(=O)CN)OC)I
- InChI: InChI=1S/C10H12INO3/c1-14-9-4-7(11)10(15-2)3-6(9)8(13)5-12/h3-4H,5,12H2,1-2H3; Key:SGQREGRMRKZYSF-UHFFFAOYSA-N

βk-2C-I, or bk-2C-I, also known as β-keto-4-iodo-2,5-dimethoxyphenethylamine or as β-keto-2C-I, is a psychedelic drug of the phenethylamine and 2C families related to 2C-I. It is the β-keto derivative of 2C-I and is cathinone-like in chemical structure. The drug is closely related to βk-2C-B. It is said to have a longer duration than 2C-I and to not be as intense in its effects as βk-2C-B. Concerns have been expressed about the potential toxicity of the iodine in βk-2C-I. The interactions of βk-2C-I with monoamine oxidase have been studied. βk-2C-I was encountered as a novel designer drug online by at least 2016 and was first described in the scientific literature by 2018. βk-2C-I is a controlled substance in Canada under phenethylamine blanket-ban language.

== See also ==
- 2C (psychedelics)
