= 2C-O-22 =

Clinical data
- Other names: 4-(2,2,2-Trifluoroethoxy)-2,5-dimethoxyphenethylamine; 2,5-Dimethoxy-4-(2,2,2-trifluoroethoxy)phenethylamine
- Routes of administration: Oral
- Drug class: Serotonin receptor modulator; Serotonin 5-HT_{2A} receptor agonist; Serotonergic psychedelic; Hallucinogen
- ATC code: None

Pharmacokinetic data
- Duration of action: Unknown

Identifiers
- IUPAC name: 2-[2,5-dimethoxy-4-(2,2,2-trifluoroethoxy)phenyl]ethanamine
- PubChem CID: 57498514

Chemical and physical data
- Formula: C_{12}H_{16}F_{3}NO_{3}
- Molar mass: 279.259 g·mol^{−1}
- 3D model (JSmol): Interactive image
- SMILES: COC1=CC(=C(C=C1CCN)OC)OCC(F)(F)F
- InChI: InChI=1S/C12H16F3NO3/c1-17-9-6-11(19-7-12(13,14)15)10(18-2)5-8(9)3-4-16/h5-6H,3-4,7,16H2,1-2H3; Key:WXMPTDDEIHHBRM-UHFFFAOYSA-N

2C-O-22, also known as 4-(2,2,2-trifluoroethoxy)-2,5-dimethoxyphenethylamine, is a psychedelic drug of the phenethylamine and 2C families. According to Daniel Trachsel, 2C-O-22 produced potential threshold effects at a dose of 42 mg plus 15 mg orally, with Trachsel listing its dose as 57 mg or more. The drug's duration is unknown and its effects were not further described. The receptor interactions of 2C-O-22 have been studied, with it having been found to act as a serotonin 5-HT_{2A} receptor agonist among other actions. 2C-O-22 was first described in the scientific literature by Trachsel in 2012. It is a controlled substance in Canada under phenethylamine blanket-ban language.

== See also ==
- 2C (psychedelics)
