= 2C (psychedelics) =

Family of phenethylamine psychedelics

General structure of a 2C compound.

2C (2C-x) is a general name for the family of psychedelic phenethylamines containing methoxy groups on the 2 and 5 positions of a benzene ring. Most of these compounds also carry lipophilic substituents at the 4 position, usually resulting in more potent and more metabolically stable and longer acting compounds.

Most of the early 2C drugs were developed by Alexander Shulgin in the 1970s and 1980s and were reviewed in his 1991 book PiHKAL (Phenethylamines I Have Known And Loved). 2C-B is the most popular of the 2C drugs. The prefix "2C" comes from the fact that they are phenethylamines rather than amphetamines and have two carbon atoms in their side chain, whereas the suffix (e.g., the "–B" or "bromo" in the case of 2C–B) refers to the substituent at the 4-position.

== Use and effects ==
The 2C drugs are orally active at doses of 6 to 150 mg, depending on the drug, and have durations of 3 to 48 hours, also depending on the drug. Several have doses in the range of 10 to 60 mg and durations in the range of 4 to 12 hours. The 2C drugs produce psychedelic effects, such as perceptual enhancement, psychedelic visuals, and euphoria. Some, such as 2C-B, have also been reported to produce some entactogen-like effects, but findings in this area appear to be mixed.

Oral doses and durations of 2C drugs
Compound	Chemical name	Dose	Duration
2C-AL	4-Allyl-2,5-dimethoxyphenethylamine	Unknown	Unknown
2C-B	4-Bromo-2,5-dimethoxyphenethylamine	10–35 mg	4–8 hours
2C-Bu	4-Butyl-2,5-dimethoxyphenethylamine	Unknown	Unknown
2C-C	4-Chloro-2,5-dimethoxyphenethylamine	20–40 mg	4–8 hours
2C-CN	4-Cyano-2,5-dimethoxyphenethylamine	>22 mg	Unknown
2C-CP	4-Cyclopropyl-2,5-dimethoxyphenethylamine	15–35 mg	3–6 hours
2C-D (2C-M)	4-Methyl-2,5-dimethoxyphenethylamine	20–60 mg	4–6 hours
2C-E	4-Ethyl-2,5-dimethoxyphenethylamine	10–25 mg	6–12 hours
2C-EF	4-Fluoroethyl-2,5-dimethoxyphenethylamine	6–20 mg	8-12 hours
2C-F	4-Fluoro-2,5-dimethoxyphenethylamine	≥250 mg	Unknown
2C-G (2C-G-0)	3,4-Dimethyl-2,5-dimethoxyphenethylamine	20–35 mg	18–30 hours
2C-G-3	3,4-Trimethylene-2,5-dimethoxyphenethylamine	16–25 mg	12–24 hours
2C-G-5	3,4-Norbornyl-2,5-dimethoxyphenethylamine	10–16 mg	32–48 hours
2C-G-N	1,4-Dimethoxynaphthyl-2-ethylamine	20–40 mg	20–30 hours
2C-H (2,5-DMPEA)	2,5-Dimethoxyphenethylamine	Unknown	Unknown
2C-I	4-Iodo-2,5-dimethoxyphenethylamine	14–22 mg	6–10 hours
2C-iBu	4-Isobutyl-2,5-dimethoxyphenethylamine	≥5 mg	~20 hours
2C-iP	4-Isopropyl-2,5-dimethoxyphenethylamine	8–25 mg	8–12 hours
2C-N	4-Nitro-2,5-dimethoxyphenethylamine	100–150 mg	4–6 hours
2C-O (2,4,5-TMPEA)	4-Methoxy-2,5-dimethoxyphenethylamine	>300 mg	Unknown
2C-O-4	4-Isopropoxy-2,5-dimethoxyphenethylamine	>60 mg	Unknown
2C-O-22	4-(2,2,2-Trifluoroethoxy)-2,5-dimethoxyphenethylamine	≥57 mg	Unknown
2C-P	4-Propyl-2,5-dimethoxyphenethylamine	6–10 mg	5–16 hours
2C-Ph (2C-BI-1)	4-Phenyl-2,5-dimethoxyphenethylamine	Unknown	Unknown
2C-Se	4-Methylseleno-2,5-dimethoxyphenethylamine	~100 mg	6–8 hours
2C-T (2C-T-1)	4-Methylthio-2,5-dimethoxyphenethylamine	60–100 mg	3–5 hours
2C-T-2	4-Ethylthio-2,5-dimethoxyphenethylamine	12–25 mg	6–8 hours
2C-T-3 (2C-T-20)	4-Methallylthio-2,5-dimethoxyphenethylamine	15–40 mg	8–14 hours
2C-T-4	4-Isopropylthio-2,5-dimethoxyphenethylamine	8–20 mg	12–18 hours
2C-T-7	4-Propylthio-2,5-dimethoxyphenethylamine	10–30 mg	8–15 hours
2C-T-8	4-Cyclopropylmethylthio-2,5-dimethoxyphenethylamine	30–50 mg	10–15 hours
2C-T-9	4-tert-Butylthio-2,5-dimethoxyphenethylamine	60–100 mg	12–18 hours
2C-T-13	4-(2-Methoxyethylthio)-2,5-dimethoxyphenethylamine	25–40 mg	6–8 hours
2C-T-15	4-Cyclopropylthio-2,5-dimethoxyphenethylamine	>30 mg	Several hours
2C-T-16	4-Allylthio-2,5-dimethoxyphenethylamine	10–25 mg	4–6 hours
2C-T-17	4-sec-Butylthio-2,5-dimethoxyphenethylamine	60–100 mg	10–15 hours
2C-T-19	4-Butylthio-2,5-dimethoxyphenethylamine	Unknown	Unknown
2C-T-21	4-(2-Fluoroethylthio)-2,5-dimethoxyphenethylamine	8–20 mg	7–10 hours
2C-T-21.5	4-(2,2-Difluoroethylthio)-2,5-dimethoxyphenethylamine	12–30 mg	8–14 hours
2C-T-22	4-(2,2,2-Trifluoroethylthio)-2,5-dimethoxyphenethylamine	>10 mg	~6 hours
2C-T-25	4-Isobutylthio-2,5-dimethoxyphenethylamine	>30 mg	Unknown
2C-T-27	4-Benzylthio-2,5-dimethoxyphenethylamine	≥80 mg	Unknown
2C-T-28	4-(3-Fluoropropylthio)-2,5-dimethoxyphenethylamine	8–20 mg	8–10 hours
2C-T-30	4-(4-Fluorobutylthio)-2,5-dimethoxyphenethylamine	>8 mg	Unknown
2C-T-33	4-(3-Methoxybenzylthio)-2,5-dimethoxyphenethylamine	Unknown	Unknown
2C-T-36 (2C-T-TFM)	4-Trifluoromethylthio-2,5-dimethoxyphenethylamine	Unknown	Unknown
2C-tBu	4-tert-Butyl-2,5-dimethoxyphenethylamine	>5–10 mg	Unknown
2C-Te	4-Methyltelluro-2,5-dimethoxyphenethylamine	Unknown	Unknown
2C-TFE	4-(2,2,2-Trifluoroethyl)-2,5-dimethoxyphenethylamine	5–15 mg	12–24 hours
2C-TFM	4-Trifluoromethyl-2,5-dimethoxyphenethylamine	3–6 mg	≥5–10 hours
2C-V	4-Ethenyl-2,5-dimethoxyphenethylamine	~25 mg	~5 hours
2C-YN	4-Ethynyl-2,5-dimethoxyphenethylamine	~50 mg	~2 hours
Refs:

== Interactions ==
The 2C drugs are metabolized by the monoamine oxidase (MAO) enzymes, including both MAO-A and MAO-B. As a result, they may be potentiated by monoamine oxidase inhibitors (MAOIs), such as phenelzine, tranylcypromine, moclobemide, and selegiline. This may lead to overdose and serious toxicity. There are anecdotal reports of strong potentiation of 2C-B by MAOIs, including hospitalization. There is no known reversal agent for 2C drugs, and medical management for overdose involves treatment of symptoms until toxicity within the body subsides.

== Pharmacology ==
=== Pharmacodynamics ===
==== Actions ====
The 2C drugs act as agonists of the serotonin 5-HT_{2} receptors, including of the serotonin 5-HT_{2A}, 5-HT_{2B}, and 5-HT_{2C} receptors. They are partial agonists of the serotonin 5-HT_{2A} receptor. Most of the 2C drugs have much lower affinity for the serotonin 5-HT_{1A} receptor than for the serotonin 5-HT_{2A} receptor. Most of the 2C drugs have also shown about 5- to 15-fold higher affinity for the serotonin 5-HT_{2A} receptor over the serotonin 5-HT_{2C} receptor and about 15- to 100-fold higher affinity for the serotonin 5-HT_{2A} receptor over the serotonin 5-HT_{1A} receptor. The psychedelic effects of the 2C drugs are thought to be mediated specifically by activation of the serotonin 5-HT_{2A} receptor.

Unlike many other phenethylamines, 2C drugs, including 2C-C, 2C-D, 2C-E, 2C-I, and 2C-T-2 among others, are inactive as monoamine releasing agents and reuptake inhibitors. Most of the 2C drugs are agonists of the rat and mouse trace amine-associated receptor 1 (TAAR1). However, most are inactive as agonists of the human TAAR1. The 2C drugs show very weak monoamine oxidase inhibition, including of monoamine oxidase A (MAO-A) and/or monoamine oxidase B (MAO-B).

2C drugs at serotonin 5-HT_{1} and 5-HT_{2} receptors
Drug	5-HT_{1A}			5-HT_{1B}	5-HT_{2A}			5-HT_{2B}			5-HT_{2C}		
Drug	K_{i} (nM)	EC_{50} (nM)	E_{max} (%)	K_{i} (nM)	K_{i} (nM)	EC_{50} (nM)	E_{max} (%)	K_{i} (nM)	EC_{50} (nM)	E_{max} (%)	K_{i} (nM)	EC_{50} (nM)	E_{max} (%)
2C-B	130–311	ND	ND	104.4	6.9–27.6	1.89–80	5–99%	13.5	75–130	52–89%	43–89.5	0.031–0.264	104–116%
2C-C	190–740	>10,000	<25%	252.9	5.47–13	9.27–200	49–102%	ND	280	81%	5.4–90	24.2	94%
2C-D	440–1,630	>10,000	<25%	ND	23.9–32.4	43.5–350	41–125%	ND	230	77%	12.7–150	71.1	100%
2C-E	307.3–1,190	>10,000	<25%	ND	4.50–43.9	2.5–110	40–125%	25.1	190	66%	5.4–104.1	0.233–18.0	98–106%
2C-H	70	ND	ND	ND	1,600	2,408–9,400	28–67%	ND	6,200	46%	4,100	ND	ND
2C-I	180–970	4,900	102%	ND	3.5–9.3	3.83–60	15–82%	ND	150	70%	10.2–40	2.8	79–100%
2C-N	2,200	ND	ND	ND	23.5	170	20–48%	ND	730	74%	370	ND	40–50%
2C-P	110	ND	ND	ND	8.1	90	63%	ND	130	72%	40	ND	ND
2C-T-1	1,035	ND	ND	ND	49	2.0	75%	ND	57	58%	347	ND	ND
2C-T-2	370–1,740	3,000	76%	857.5	9–39.9	0.354–80	67–128%	6	130	75%	14.2–69	0.0233–3.8	87–107%
2C-T-4	470–916	ND	ND	ND	27.9–54	5.5–220	56–87%	ND	63–160	68–75%	180–295	ND	ND
2C-T-7	520–878	ND	ND	ND	5.3–6.5	1.2–130	49–101%	ND	52–350	45–75%	39–54	ND	ND
Notes: The smaller the value, the more avidly the drug binds to or activates the site. Refs:

==== Effects ====
In accordance with their psychedelic effects in humans, the 2C drugs produce the head-twitch response and wet dog shakes, behavioral proxies of psychedelic effects, in rodents. At least some 2C drugs, such as 2C-D and 2C-E, produce hyperlocomotion at lower doses in rodents. All 2C drugs produce hypolocomotion at higher doses in rodents. 2C drugs, including 2C-C, 2C-D, 2C-E, and 2C-I, substitute partially to fully for psychedelics like DOM, DMT, and LSD and/or for the entactogen MDMA in rodent drug discrimination tests. However, none of the assessed 2C drugs substituted for dextromethamphetamine, suggesting that they lack amphetamine-type or stimulant-like effects.

In contrast to most psychedelics, at least two assessed 2C drugs, 2C-C and 2C-P, have shown reinforcing effects in rodents, including conditioned place preference (CPP) and self-administration. The mechanism by which these effects are mediated is unknown. However, it may be related to reduced expression of the dopamine transporter (DAT) and increased DAT phosphorylation, in turn resulting in increased extracellular dopamine levels in certain brain areas. These 2C drugs might have misuse potential in humans. Similar reinforcing effects in animals have been observed for NBOMe analogues of 2C drugs, including 25B-NBOMe, 25D-NBOMe, 25E-NBOMe, 25H-NBOMe, and 25N-NBOMe.

Similarly to DOI, tolerance has been found to gradually develop to the head-twitch response induced by 2C-T-7 with chronic administration in rodents.

Various 2C drugs show potent anti-inflammatory effects mediated by serotonin 5-HT_{2A} receptor activation. Among these include 2C-I, 2C-B, 2C-H, and 2C-iBu. Others, such as 2C-B-Fly and 2C-T-33, were less effective. 2C-iBu has shown a greater separation between anti-inflammatory effects and psychedelic-like effects in animals than other 2C drugs and is being investigated for possible use as a pharmaceutical drug.

=== Pharmacokinetics ===
The 2C drugs are orally active. They are metabolized by O-demethylation and deamination. This is mediated specifically by monoamine oxidase (MAO) enzymes MAO-A and MAO-B, whereas cytochrome P450 enzymes appear to metabolize only some 2C drugs and to have only a very small role.

== Chemistry ==
The 2C drugs, also known as 4-substituted 2,5-dimethoxyphenethylamines, are substituted phenethylamines and can be thought of as synthetic analogues of the naturally occurring phenethylamine psychedelic mescaline (3,4,5-trimethoxyphenethylamine). They are the phenethylamine (2C) analogues of the amphetamine (α-methylphenethylamine) DOx drugs like DOM, DOB, and DOI as well as of the phenylisobutylamine (α-ethylphenethylamine) 4C drugs like Ariadne (4C-D) and 4C-B. The N-benzylphenethylamines such as 25I-NBOMe, 25B-NBOMe, and 25C-NBOMe are derivatives of the 2C drugs. Certain FLY drugs such as 2C-B-FLY are also 2C derivatives.

=== Syntheses ===
The chemical syntheses of 2C drugs have been described.

=== Analysis ===
The chemical analysis of 2C drugs has been described.

== History ==
2,4,5-Trimethoxyphenethylamine (2,4,5-TMPEA; 2C-O), the 2C positional isomer of mescaline (3,4,5-trimethoxyphenethylamine), was first synthesized by Max Jansen and was reported to produce psychedelic effects similar to those of mescaline in 1931. However, subsequent studies in the 1960s and 1970s suggested that 2,4,5-TMPEA may actually be inactive as a psychedelic in animals and humans.

2C-D was the first of the 2C drugs after 2C-O to be discovered. It was synthesized and studied in animals by Beng T. Ho and colleagues at the Texas Research Institute of Mental Sciences and they published their findings in 1970. Alexander Shulgin synthesized 2C-B and 2C-D in 1974 and discovered their psychedelic effects in self-experiments conducted in 1974 and 1975. He published his findings in the scientific literature in 1975. However, Shulgin had previously tested sub-threshold doses of 2C-D in 1964 and 1965. 2C-T was first described by Shulgin and David E. Nichols in 1976. 2C-I was first described by Shulgin and colleagues in 1977 and initial psychoactivity was reported by Shulgin in 1978. Shulgin also first synthesized 2C-E in 1977. He reviewed several of these 2C drugs in a literature review in 1979. Subsequently, numerous other 2C drugs have been synthesized and characterized. Shulgin comprehensively reviewed and described the 2C drugs in his 1991 book PiHKAL (Phenethylamines I Have Known and Loved). He coined the term "2C", this term being an acronym for the two carbon atoms between the benzene ring and the amino group of the 2C drugs and a means to distinguish them from the three-carbon DOx drugs.

2C-D was extensively studied by Hanscarl Leuner under the names DMM-PEA and LE-25 in psychedelic-assisted psychotherapy in Germany in the 1970s and 1980s. It was also informally studied by Darrell Lemaire as a potential "smart drug" in the 1970s and 1980s. He additionally developed the TWEETIO drugs such as 2CD-5-ETO via structural modification of the 2Cs. 2C-B was legitimately marketed and sold as an over-the-counter sexual enhancer under brand names like Erox in several European countries such as Germany in the 1980s and early 1990s. It was sold in adult stores, smart shops, and some nightclubs.

2C-B was first encountered as a novel designer drug in the United States in 1979. It gained popularity as a recreational drug and MDMA (ecstasy) alternative in the mid-1980s. The drug became a controlled substance in the United States in 1994 or 1995. It has been said to be the most popular of the 2C drugs in terms of recreational use. Numerous other 2C drugs besides 2C-B have also since been made controlled substances.

== Society and culture ==
=== Legal status ===
==== Canada ====
As of October 12, 2016, the 2C-x family of substituted phenethylamines are controlled substances (Schedule III) in Canada.

== List of 2C drugs ==
Name	R3	R4	Structure	CAS #
2C-B	H	Br		66142–81–2
2C-Bn	H	CH_{2}C_{6}H_{5}		?
2C-Bu	H	CH_{2}CH_{2}CH_{2}CH_{3}		2888537-44-6
2C-C	H	Cl		88441–14–9
2C-C-3	Cl	Cl		?
2C-CN	H	C≡N		88441–07–0
2C-D	H	CH_{3}		24333–19–5
2C-E	H	CH_{2}CH_{3}		71539–34–9
2C-EF	H	CH_{2}CH_{2}F		1222814–77–8
2C-F	H	F		207740–15–6
2C-G (2C-G-0)	CH_{3}	CH_{3}		207740–18–9
2C-G-1	CH_{2}			2888537-47-9
2C-G-2	(CH_{2})_{2}			2888537-48-0
2C-G-3	(CH_{2})_{3}			207740–19–0
2C-G-4	(CH_{2})_{4}			952006–59–6
2C-G-5	(CH_{2})_{5}			207740–20–3
2C-G-6	(CH_{2})_{6}			2888537-49-1
2C-G-N	(CH)_{4}			207740–21–4
2C-H	H	H		3600–86–0
2C-I	H	I		69587–11–7
2C-iBu (2C-iB)	H	iBu		?
2C-iP	H	CH(CH_{3})_{2}		1498978–47–4
2C-tBu	H	C(CH_{3})_{3}		?
2C-CP	H	C_{3}H_{5}		2888537–46–8
2C-CB	H	C_{4}H_{7}		?
2C-CPe	H	C_{5}H_{9}		?
2C-CPM	H	C_{4}H_{7}		?
2C-N	H	NO_{2}		261789–00–8
2C-NH2	H	NH_{2}		168699–66–9
2C-PYR	H	Pyrrolidine		?
2C-PIP	H	Piperidine		?
2C-O (2C-O-1)	H	OCH_{3}		15394–83–9
2C-O-4	H	OCH(CH_{3})_{2}		952006–65–4
2C-O-22	H	OCH_{2}CF_{3}		?
2C-MOM	H	CH_{2}OCH_{3}		?
2C-P	H	CH_{2}CH_{2}CH_{3}		207740–22–5
2C-Ph (2C-BI-1)	H	C_{6}H_{5}		?
2C-Se	H	SeCH_{3}		1189246–68–1
2C-Se-TFM	H	SeCF_{3}		?
2C-Te	H	TeCH_{3}		?
2C-Te-TFM	H	TeCF_{3}		?
2C-T	H	SCH_{3}		61638–09–3
2C-T-2	H	SCH_{2}CH_{3}		207740–24–7
2C-T-3	H	SCH_{2}C(=CH_{2})CH_{3}		648957–40–8
2C-T-4	H	SCH(CH_{3})_{2}		207740–25–8
2C-T-5	H			1187859-38-6
2C-T-6	H	SC_{6}H_{5}		?
2C-T-7	H	S(CH_{2})_{2}CH_{3}		207740–26–9
2C-T-8	H	SCH_{2}CH(CH_{2})_{2}		207740–27–0
2C-T-9	H	SC(CH_{3})_{3}		207740–28–1
2C-T-10	H			?
2C-T-11	H	SC_{6}H_{4}-p-Br		?
2C-T-12	H			?
2C-T-13	H	S(CH_{2})_{2}OCH_{3}		207740–30–5
2C-T-14	H	S(CH_{2})_{2}SCH_{3}		?
2C-T-15	H	SCH(CH_{2})_{2}		952006-95-0
2C-T-16	H	SCH_{2}CH=CH_{2}		648957–42–0
2C-T-17	H	SCH(CH_{3})CH_{2}CH_{3}		207740–32–7
2C-T-18	H			?
2C-T-19	H	SCH_{2}CH_{2}CH_{2}CH_{3}		732244-33-6
2C-T-21	H	S(CH_{2})_{2}F		207740–33–8
2C-T-21.5	H	S(CH_{2})CHF_{2}		648957–46–4
2C-T-22	H	S(CH_{2})CF_{3}		648957–48–6
2C-T-23	H			?
2C-T-24	H			?
2C-T-25	H	SCH_{2}CH(CH_{3})_{2}		648957-50-0
2C-T-27	H	SCH_{2}C_{6}H_{5}		648957–52–2
2C-T-28	H	S(CH_{2})_{3}F		648957–54–4
2C-T-29 (2C-T-PARGY)	H	S(CH_{2})C≡CH		?
2C-T-30	H	S(CH_{2})_{4}F		648957-56-6
2C-T-31	H	SCH_{2}C_{6}H_{4}-p-CF_{3}		?
2C-T-32	H	SCH_{2}C_{6}F_{5}		?
2C-T-33	H	SCH_{2}C_{6}H_{4}-m-OCH_{3}		?
2C-T-34 (2C-T-FM)	H	SCFH_{2}		?
2C-T-35 (2C-T-DFM)	H	SCF_{2}H		?
2C-T-36 (2C-T-TFM; CYB210010; CYB2108)	H	SCF_{3}		2762567-99-5
CYB2108D (deuterated 2C-T-36; see HLP005 (CYB005))	H	SCF_{3}		?
2C-T-CH2CN	H	S(CH_{2})C≡N		?
2C-T-pent-4-ynyl	H	S(CH_{2})_{3}C≡CH		?
2C-T-TFM-sulfone	H	SO_{2}CF_{3}		?
2C-T-DFP	H	SCH_{2}CH_{2}CF_{2}H		?
2C-T-TFP	H	SCH_{2}CH_{2}CF_{3}		?
2C-DFM	H	CHF_{2}		?
2C-TFM	H	CF_{3}		159277–08–4
2C-TFE	H	CH_{2}CF_{3}		?
2C-PFE	H	CF_{2}CF_{3}		?
2C-PFS	H	SF_{5}		?
2C-YN	H	C≡CH		752982–24–4
2C-V	H	CH=CH_{2}		2888537-57-1
2C-AL	H	CH_{2}CH=CH_{2}		2756686-02-7
2C-1MV	H	1-Methylvinyl		?
2C-MAL	H	Methallyl		?

== Related compounds ==
Name	Chemical name	Structure	CAS #	Ref
2C-DB (6-bromo-2C-B)	2,5-Dimethoxy-4,6-dibromophenethylamine		?	
25H-NMe (N-methyl-2C-H)	2,5-Dimethoxy-N-methylphenethylamine		3489-95-0	
N-Methyl-2C-B (2C-B-M, 2C-BM)	N-Methyl-4-bromo-2,5-dimethoxyphenethylamine		155639-22-8	
N-Ethyl-2C-B (2C-B-E, 2C-BE)	N-Ethyl-4-bromo-2,5-dimethoxyphenethylamine		155639-24-0	
2C-B-OH (N-hydroxy-2C-B)	4-Bromo-2,5-dimethoxy-N-hydroxyphenethylamine		?	
25B-NB (N-benzyl-2C-B)	N-Benzyl-4-bromo-2,5-dimethoxyphenethylamine		155639-26-2	
N-Methyl-2C-I	N-Methyl-4-iodo-2,5-dimethoxyphenethylamine		?	
β-Methyl-2C-B (BMB)	4-Bromo-2,5-dimethoxy-β-methylphenylethylamine		52432-70-9	
β-Keto-2C-B (βk-2C-B)	4-Bromo-2,5-dimethoxy-β-ketophenylethylamine		807631-09-0	
β-Keto-2C-I (βk-2C-I)	4-Iodo-2,5-dimethoxy-β-ketophenylethylamine		?	
2C-B-AN (2C-B-aminonitrile)	4-Bromo-N-(α′-cyanobenzyl)-2,5-dimethoxyphenethylamine		?	
25D-NM-NDEAOP (25D-NM-NDEPA)	N-Methyl-N-(3-diethylamino-3-oxopropyl)-2,5-dimethoxy-4-methylphenethylamine		?	
25B-NAcPip	N-(Piperidin-1-ylcarbonylmethyl)-4-bromo-2,5-dimethoxyphenethylamine		?	
XOB (ASR-6001)	N-[(4-Phenylbutoxy)hexyl]-4-bromo-2,5-dimethoxyphenethylamine		?	
TCB-2 (2CBCB, 2C-BCB)	[3-Bromo-2,5-dimethoxy-bicyclo[4.2.0]octa-1,3,5-trien-7-yl]methanamine		?	
2CB-Ind	(5-Bromo-4,7-dimethoxy-2,3-dihydro-1H-inden-1-yl)methanamine		912342-23-5	
ZC-B (2C-B-AZET)	3-(4-Bromo-2,5-dimethoxyphenyl)azetidine		2641630-65-9	
2C-B-PYR	3-(4-Bromo-2,5-dimethoxyphenyl)pyrrolidine		?	
2C-B-3PIP	3-(4-Bromo-2,5-dimethoxyphenyl)piperidine		?	
LPH-5 ((S)-2C-TFM-3PIP)	(S)-3-(2,5-Dimethoxy-4-(trifluoromethyl)phenyl)piperidine		2641630-97-7	
DEMPDHPCA-2C-D ("compound 45")	1-Methyl-3-(1-oxo-1-diethylaminomethyl)-5-(2,5-dimethoxy-4-methylphenyl)-3,6-dihydro-2H-pyridine		?	
DOM-CR (DOM-THIQ, 2C-D-CR)	5,8-Dimethoxy-7-methyl-1,2,3,4-tetrahydroisoquinoline		?	
DOB-CR (DOB-THIQ, 2C-B-CR)	5,8-Dimethoxy-7-bromo-1,2,3,4-tetrahydroisoquinoline		183429-24-5	
N-Methyl-DOM-CR (Beatrice-CR, N-methyl-2C-D-CR)	2,7-Dimethyl-5,8-dimethoxy-1,2,3,4-tetrahydroisoquinoline		228997-46-4	
2C-B-morpholine (2C-B-MOR)	2-(4-Bromo-2,5-dimethoxyphenyl)morpholine		807631-07-8	
2C-B-aminorex (2C-B-AR)	5-(4-Bromo-2,5-dimethoxyphenyl)-4,5-dihydro-1,3-oxazol-2-amine		?	
2C-B-PP	1-(2,5-Dimethoxy-4-bromophenyl)piperazine		100939-87-5	
2C-B-BZP	1-[(4-Bromo-2,5-dimethoxyphenyl)methyl]piperazine		1094424-37	
2C-B-5-hemiFLY-α6 (BNAP)	8-Bromo-6-methoxy-2a,3,4,5-tetrahydro-2H-naphtho[1,8-bc]furan-4-amine		?	
2CB7 (2C-B-5-hemiFLY-β7)	(5-Bromo-7-methoxy-3-oxatricyclo[6.4.1.0^{4,13}]trideca-4,6,8(13)-trien-9-yl)methanamine		?	
2-OH-2C-B (2-DM-2C-B; B-2-HMPEA)	4-Bromo-2-hydroxy-5-methoxyphenethylamine		?	
2C-2-TOM (2-thio-2C-D)	5-Methoxy-4-methyl-2-methylthiophenethylamine		?	
2C-5-TOM (5-thio-2C-D)	2-Methoxy-4-methyl-5-methylthiophenethylamine		?	
2C-2-TOET (2-thio-2C-E)	4-Ethyl-5-methoxy-2-methylthiophenethylamine		?	
2C-5-TOET (5-thio-2C-E)	4-Ethyl-2-methoxy-5-methylthiophenethylamine		?	
2T-2CTFM-3PIP (2-thio-LPH-5)	3-(5-Methoxy-2-methylthio-4-(trifluoromethyl)phenyl)piperidine		?	

== See also ==
- 25-NB, BOx, HOT-x, scaline, 3C, DOx, 4C, Ψ-PEA, FLY, TWEETIO
- List of miscellaneous serotonin 5-HT_{2A} receptor agonists
- The Shulgin Index
- Substituted amphetamines
- Substituted methoxyphenethylamine
- Substituted methylenedioxyphenethylamines
- Substituted phenethylamines
- Substituted tryptamines
