= Food and Drug Administration Safety and Innovation Act =

Piece of American regulatory legislation

- Long title: An Act to amend the Federal Food, Drug, and Cosmetic Act to revise and extend the user-fee programs for prescription drugs and medical devices, to establish user-fee programs for generic drugs and biosimilars, and for other purposes.
- Enacted by: the 112th United States Congress

Citations
- Public law: Pub. L. 112–144 (text) (PDF)
- Statutes at Large: 126 Stat. 993 through 126 Stat. 1132 (140 pages)

Codification
- Agencies affected: Food and Drug Administration

Legislative history
- Introduced in the Senate as S. 3187 by Tom Harkin (D-IA) on May 15, 2012; Signed into law by President Barack Obama on July 9, 2012

The Food and Drug Administration Safety and Innovation Act of 2012 (FDASIA) is a piece of American regulatory legislation signed into law on July 9, 2012. It gives the United States Food and Drug Administration (FDA) the authority to collect user fees from the medical industry to fund reviews of innovator drugs, medical devices, generic drugs and biosimilar biologics. It also creates the breakthrough therapy designation program and extends the priority review voucher program to make eligible rare pediatric diseases. The measure was passed by 96 senators voting for and one voting against.

== Title I: Fees Relating to Drugs ==
Title I extends through FY2017 the authority of the FDA, through the authority of the Secretary of Health and Human Services, to collect drug application and supplement fees, prescription drug establishment fees, and prescription drug product fees to support the FDA process for reviewing human drug applications.

It requires the FDA to submit annually to the House Committee on Energy and Commerce and the Senate Committee on Health, Education, Labor, and Pensions, a report on the progress of the FDA in achieving the goals of the administration, future plans of the FDA, and the progress of the Center for Drug Evaluation and Research and Center for Biologics Evaluation and Research in achieving such goals. The report should include the number of: (1) new drug applications and biologics license applications filed, (2) priority new drug and biologics applications filed, (3) standard efficacy supplements, (4) priority efficacy supplements, (5) applications filed for review under accelerated approval, (6) applications filed for review as fast track products, (7) applications filed for orphan-designated products, and (8) breakthrough designations.

== Title II: Fees Relating to Devices ==
Title II extends through FY2017 the authority of the FDA to assess and collect fees for medical device applications and submissions. It authorizes the FDA to grant a full or partial waiver of medical device user fees if the FDA finds that the waiver is in the interest of public health.

== Title III: Fees Relating to Generic Drugs ==
Title III directs the FDA to assess and collect fees related to generic drugs: (1) a one-time backlog fee for abbreviated new drug applications pending on October 1, 2012; (2) a drug master file fee; (3) an abbreviated new drug application and prior approval supplement filing fee, as well as an additional fee for certain active pharmaceutical ingredient information; and (4) a generic drug facility fee and active pharmaceutical ingredient facility fee.

== Title IV: Fees Relating to Biosimilar Biological Products ==
Similarly to Title III, Title IV directs the FDA to assess and collect the following fees related to biosimilar biological products: (1) biosimilar program development fees, encompassing an initial biosimilar development fee, an annual biosimilar development fee, and a reactivation fee; (2) a biosimilar product application and supplement fee; (3) a biosimilar product establishment fee; and (4) a biosimilar product fee. Fees are waived for the first biosimilar application of a small business.

== Title V: Pediatric Drugs and Devices ==
Title V makes permanent the Best Pharmaceuticals for Children Act, granting extended market exclusivity for new and already-marketed drugs for the pediatric population, and the Pediatric Research Equity Act of 2003 for research into pediatric uses for existing drugs. Exclusivity will be granted only upon a written request.

It also grants authority to the FDA to extend a deadline for a pediatric drug study. It requires an applicant for a pediatric drug to submit an initial pediatric study plan to the FDA prior to the submission of drug safety assessments.

== Title VI: Medical Device Regulatory Improvements ==
Title VI prohibits the FDA from rejecting an application for approval of a medical device for investigational use on the basis that: (1) the investigation may not support a substantial equivalence or de novo classification determination or approval of the device; (2) the investigation may not meet a requirement, including a data requirement, relating to the approval or clearance of a device; or (3) an additional or different investigation may be necessary to support clearance or approval of the device.

It requires the FDA to establish a program to assess information relating to recalls of medical devices, and document the basis for termination by the FDA of a device recall. It authorizes the FDA to prohibit the sponsor of an investigation of the effectiveness of a medical device from conducting such investigation (issuing a clinical hold) if the FDA makes a determination that the device represents an unreasonable risk to the safety of the participants of the clinical trial.

It authorizes the FDA to classify certain new medical devices without first issuing a determination that such devices are not substantially equivalent to existing devices and change the classification of a medical device based upon new information about such device by administrative order instead of by regulation.

It expands the exemption from the prohibition on profit for medical devices that have been granted humanitarian device exemptions to include devices intended for use in adults, if such a device is intended for the treatment or diagnosis of a disease or condition that does not occur in pediatric patients, or that occurs in such numbers that the device's development is impossible, highly impracticable, or unsafe.

It authorizes the FDA to order post-marketing surveillance for medical devices at the time of their approval or clearance or at any time thereafter and requires device manufacturers to start surveillance not later than 15 months after the date the FDA issues an order. Medical devices for small or unique populations that are created or modified to comply with the order of an individual physician and that are designed to treat a unique pathology or physiological condition that no other device is domestically available to treat are exempted from post-marketing approval requirements.

== Title VII: Drug Supply Chain ==
Title VII imposes FDA registration requirements for domestic and foreign drug establishments. It expands drug product listing information to include information on drug excipient establishments, including all establishments used in the production of such excipients, a unique facility identifier of such establishment, and an e-mail address for each excipient manufacturer. It requires the FDA to maintain an electronic database for the purposes of risk-based inspections and to conduct risk-based inspections of registered drug establishments, including inspections for medical devices, and post a report on the FDA website on the number of domestic and foreign establishments registered in the previous fiscal year, the number of inspections of such establishments, and the percentage of the FDA budget used to fund such inspections.

It requires an establishment that is engaged in the manufacture or preparation of a drug to provide the FDA with records or other information in advance of an inspection. A drug is deemed adulterated if the establishment in which such drug was manufactured, processed, packed, or held does not comply with inspections.

It authorizes the FDA to destroy counterfeit or adulterated imported drug products that have minor monetary value or a reasonable probability of causing serious adverse health consequences or death. It authorizes the FDA to detain drugs found during inspection to be adulterated or misbranded. It exempts the FDA from freedom of information disclosure requirements with respect to information about drugs obtained from a foreign government if the information alerts the FDA to a potential need for a safety investigation, the information is provided to the FDA voluntarily on the condition that it is not released to the public, and the information is subject to a written agreement between the FDA and the foreign government. It authorizes the FDA to require importers of drugs to provide certain information to allow the FDA to assess the risk of importing such drugs and it requires the registration of commercial drug importers with the FDA.

It requires the FDA to publish regulations to establish good importer practices that specify the measures an importer shall take to ensure that imported drugs are in compliance. It requires a manufacturer or distributor to notify the FDA if they know that the use of a drug may result in serious injury or death, of a significant loss or theft of such drug intended for use in the US, or that a drug has been or is being counterfeited and sold in the US, or a drug has been or could be imported into the US.

An amendment proposed by John McCain to allow consumers to obtain drugs from Canada was rejected.

== Title VIII: Generating Antibiotic Incentives Now ==
Title VIII is referred to as the GAIN Act, and was passed to incentivize the development of new antibiotics in response to the growing threat of antibiotic resistance and a lack of antibiotic products in pharmaceutical manufacturers' pipelines. It extends the exclusivity period for qualified infectious disease products by five years. The extra five years of market protection is in addition to any other existing exclusivity, including those available under the Hatch-Waxman Act (3 to 5 years), orphan drug (7 years), or pediatric exclusivity (6 months).

A "qualified infectious disease product" is defined as an antibacterial or antifungal drug intended to treat serious or life-threatening infections. It requires the FDA to establish and maintain a list of pathogens qualifying for the program and makes qualified infectious disease products eligible for priority and fast track review. As of Sept. 2013, the FDA had issued 24 QIDP designations for 16 chemical entities.

In response to the GAIN Act, the FDA announced in Sept. 2012 that they were creating The Antibacterial Drug Development Task Force to assist in developing and revising guidance related to antibacterial drug development. The task force consisted of a multi-disciplinary group of 19 CDER scientists and clinicians who were charged with identifying priority areas and developing and implementing possible solutions to the challenges of antibacterial drug development.

== Title IX: Drug Approval and Patient Access ==
Title IX states that the FDA should apply accelerated approval and fast track provisions to expedite the development of treatments for serious or life-threatening diseases, while maintaining safety and effectiveness standards for such treatments. It requires the FDA, at the request of a drug sponsor, to expedite the review of a drug if the drug treats a serious or life-threatening disease or condition and the drug demonstrates substantial improvement over existing therapies. This created the breakthrough therapy designation.

It also extends through FY2017 the authorization of appropriations for grants and contracts for the development of drugs for rare diseases and conditions (orphan drugs). It directs the FDA to award a priority review voucher to a sponsor of a rare pediatric disease product application, and establish a user fee program for such sponsors.

=== Breakthrough therapy ===
Breakthrough Therapy Designation was created for drugs that may be significantly better treatments for serious diseases or conditions. On November 13, 2013, the FDA approved obinutuzumab (trade name Gazyva) by Hoffmann-La Roche for chronic lymphocytic leukemia making it the first drug to receive the breakthrough therapy designation.

== Title X: Drug Shortages ==
Title X revises requirements for notifying the FDA of drug shortages. It requires the FDA to establish a task force to develop and implement a plan for enhancing the FDA's response to preventing and mitigating drug shortages. It requires the FDA to maintain an up-to-date list of drugs determined to be in shortage, including the name of each drug in shortage, the name of each manufacturer of a drug in shortage, the reason for the shortage, and the estimated duration of the shortage.

It amends the Controlled Substances Act to require the Attorney General to review requests to increase quotas of controlled substances and make a determination within 30 days if a request pertains to a drug in shortage. It allows a hospital that is owned and operated by the same entity and that shares access to databases with drug order information for its patients to repackage a drug in shortage (i.e., divide its volume into smaller amounts) and transfer it to another hospital within the same health system without incurring otherwise applicable FDA registration requirements.

== Title XI: Other Provisions ==
Title XI includes several provisions. It provides for expanded FDA regulation of medical gases.

It requires the FDA to work with other regulatory authorities and international organizations to encourage uniform clinical trial standards for medical products worldwide, and accept data from clinical investigations conducted outside of the US in determining whether to approve a drug.

It requires the FDA to issue a final determination on any petition filed by a generic drug applicant for determining whether a drug was withdrawn for a safety or effectiveness reason no later than 270 days after the filing of any such petition.

It amends the Controlled Substances Act to add as a Schedule I controlled substance any material, compound, mixture, or preparation which contains specified cannabimimetic agents (or the salts, isomers, or salts of isomers thereof), and specified additional hallucinogenic substances.

=== Synthetic drug abuse prevention ===
The Synthetic Drug Abuse Prevention Act of 2012 bans synthetic compounds commonly found in synthetic marijuana ("K2" or "Spice"), synthetic cathinones ("bath salts") MDPV and methylone, as well as hallucinogenic drugs 2C-C, 2C-D, 2C-E, 2C-I, 2C-H, 2C-N, 2C-P, and 2C-T-2 by placing them under Schedule I of the Controlled Substances Act.

== Proposed amendments ==
Several proposed amendments were rejected.

By 28 yeas to 67 nays, Bingaman Amendment No. 2111, to allegedly provide cost savings by fostering competition among generic pharmaceutical manufacturers and ensuring that anti-competitive "pay-for-delay" settlements between brand-name and generic pharmaceutical manufacturers do not block generic drugs from entering the market.

By 46 yeas to 50 nays, Murkowski Amendment No. 2108, to prohibit approval by the Food and Drug Administration of genetically engineered fish unless the National Oceanic and Atmospheric Administration concurs with such approval.

By 43 yeas to 54 nays, McCain Amendment No. 2107, to allow the importation by individuals of safe and affordable drugs from Canada.

By 9 yeas to 88 nays, Sanders Amendment No. 2109, to revoke the exclusivity of certain entities that are responsible for violations of the Federal Food, Drug, and Cosmetic Act, the False Claims Act, and other certain laws.

Two measures were tabled: an amendment to require manufacturers of dietary supplements to register dietary supplement products with the Food and Drug Administration, and an amendment to amend the Federal Food, Drug, and Cosmetic Act concerning claims about the effects of foods and dietary supplements on health-related conditions and disease, to prohibit employees of the Food and Drug Administration from carrying firearms and making arrests without warrants, and to adjust the mens rea of certain prohibited acts under the Federal Food, Drug, and Cosmetic Act to knowing and willful.
