= 2C-T-19 =

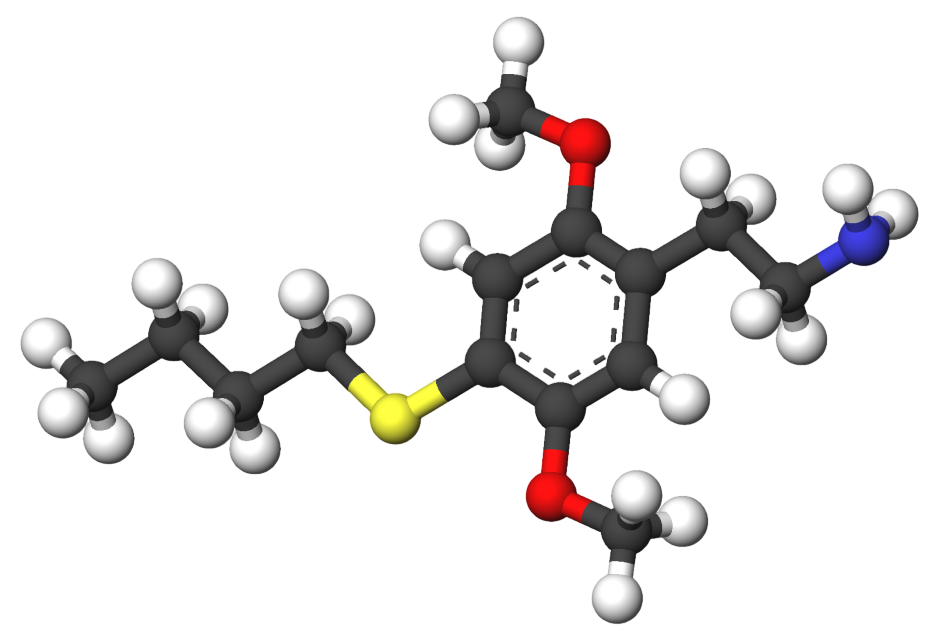

Clinical data
- Other names: 4-Butylthio-2,5-dimethoxyphenethylamine; 2,5-Dimethoxy-4-butylthiophenethylamine; 2C-T-Bu
- Routes of administration: Unknown
- ATC code: None

Pharmacokinetic data
- Duration of action: Unknown

Identifiers
- IUPAC name: 2-[4-(butylsulfanyl)-2,5-dimethoxyphenyl]ethan-1-amine
- CAS Number: 732244-33-6
- PubChem CID: 12063257
- ChemSpider: 21106235
- UNII: H190WE556H
- CompTox Dashboard (EPA): DTXSID10476737

Chemical and physical data
- Formula: C_{14}H_{23}NO_{2}S
- Molar mass: 269.40 g·mol^{−1}
- 3D model (JSmol): Interactive image
- SMILES: COc1cc(SCCCC)c(cc1CCN)OC
- InChI: InChI=1S/C14H23NO2S/c1-4-5-8-18-14-10-12(16-2)11(6-7-15)9-13(14)17-3/h9-10H,4-8,15H2,1-3H3; Key:LGUVDOBGXUFUAJ-UHFFFAOYSA-N

2C-T-19, also known as 4-butylthio-2,5-dimethoxyphenethylamine, is a possible psychedelic drug of the phenethylamine and 2C families.

== Use and effects ==
In his book PiHKAL (Phenethylamines I Have Known and Loved), Alexander Shulgin describes synthesis of the final intermediate of 2C-T-19 but did not bioassay the compound.

== Society and culture ==
=== Legal status ===
==== Canada ====
As of October 31, 2016, 2C-T-19 is a controlled substance (Schedule III) in Canada.

==== United States ====
In the United States, 2C-T-19 is not specifically scheduled, but possession and sales of 2C-T-19 could be prosecuted under the Federal Analog Act because of its structural similarities to 2C-T-7.

== See also ==
- 2C (psychedelics)
