= 2C-T-21 =

Psychedelic phenethylamine drug

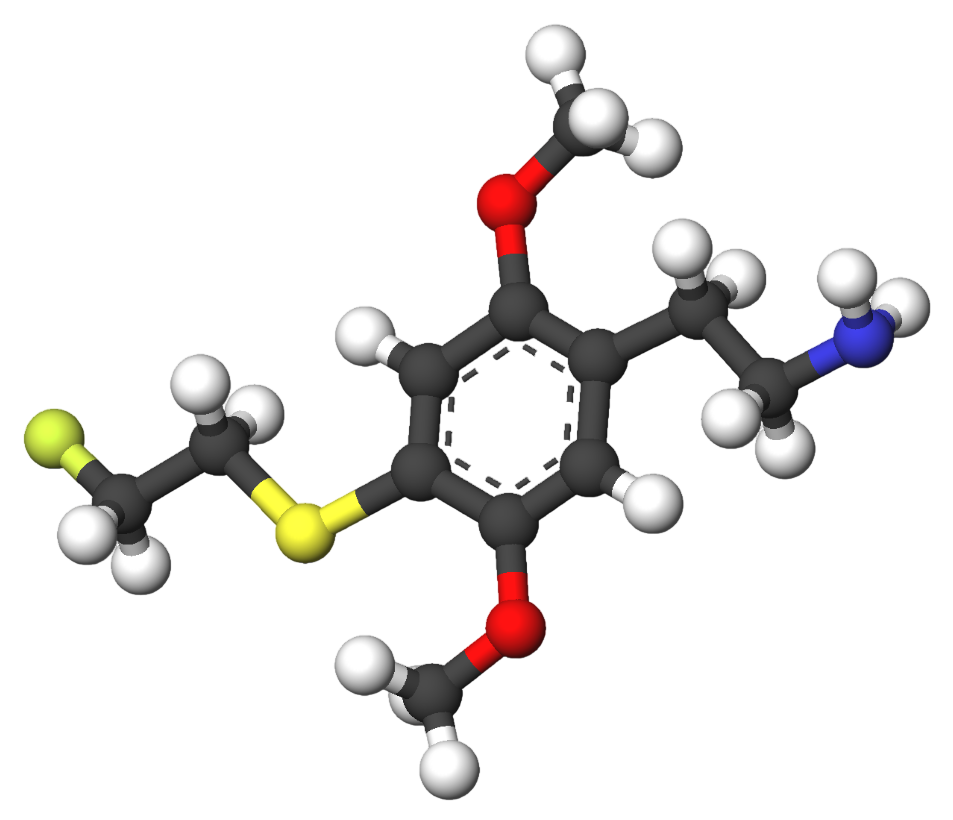

Clinical data
- Other names: 4-(2-Fluoroethylthio)-2,5-dimethoxyphenethylamine; 2,5-Dimethoxy-4-(2-fluoroethylthio)phenethylamine; 2C-T-FE
- Routes of administration: Oral
- Drug class: Serotonin receptor modulator; Serotonin 5-HT_{2A} receptor agonist; Serotonergic psychedelic; Hallucinogen
- ATC code: None

Legal status
- Legal status: In general unscheduled

Pharmacokinetic data
- Onset of action: 15 min–1 hour
- Duration of action: 7–10 hours

Identifiers
- IUPAC name: 2-{4-[(2-fluoroethyl)sulfanyl]-2,5-dimethoxyphenyl}ethan-1-amine
- CAS Number: 207740-33-8
- PubChem CID: 44349972
- ChemSpider: 21106231
- UNII: 720O3Q04GA
- ChEMBL: ChEMBL126582
- CompTox Dashboard (EPA): DTXSID00174851

Chemical and physical data
- Formula: C_{12}H_{18}FNO_{2}S
- Molar mass: 259.34 g·mol^{−1}
- 3D model (JSmol): Interactive image
- SMILES: COc1cc(SCCF)c(cc1CCN)OC
- InChI: InChI=1S/C12H18FNO2S/c1-15-10-8-12(17-6-4-13)11(16-2)7-9(10)3-5-14/h7-8H,3-6,14H2,1-2H3; Key:ZBUUUKBTOCTOPW-UHFFFAOYSA-N

2C-T-21, also known as 4-(2-fluoroethylthio)-2,5-dimethoxyphenethylamine or as 2C-T-FE, is a psychedelic phenethylamine of the 2C family. It is taken orally.

The drug acts as a serotonin 5-HT_{2} receptor agonist, including of the serotonin 5-HT_{2A} receptor.

2C-T-21 was first described in the scientific literature by Alexander Shulgin and colleagues in 1991. Shortly after this, Shulgin described 2C-T-21 in greater detail in his 1991 book PiHKAL (Phenethylamines I Have Known and Loved). The drug has been encountered as a novel designer drug.

== Use and effects ==
In his book PiHKAL (Phenethylamines I Have Known And Loved) and other publications, Alexander Shulgin lists 2C-T-21's dose as 8 to 12 mg orally and its duration as 7 to 10 hours. However, a wider dose range of 10 to 20 mg orally has also been reported. Its onset is described as 15 minutes to 1 hour and peak effects occur after 1 to 2 hours.

The effects of 2C-T-21 have been reported to include little in the way of visuals, intense after-images, difficult to define mental changes, feeling stoned, time dilation, mood enhancement or pleasantness, no euphoria, talkativeness, enhanced communication, feelings of closeness with others, feelings of inner strength and peace, no insights, and push of energy. Other effects included mental confusion, memory impairment, little or no body load, no nausea, no nystagmus, chills, yawning and ear popping, and no appetite loss.

== Toxicity ==
On March 9, 2004, a 22-year-old quadriplegic man named James Edwards Downs in St. Francisville, Louisiana, consumed an unknown dose of 2C-T-21 by sticking his tongue into a vial of powder he had purchased online. He developed a temperature of 108 °F (42 °C), had a tonic-clonic seizure, and slipped into a coma. Four days later, on March 13, Downs died at Lane Memorial Hospital in Zachary, LA.

This death became part of a two-year DEA investigation called Operation Web Tryp which was launched in 2002. On July 22, 2004, the owners of American Chemical Supply were arrested on federal charges relating to distribution of controlled substance analogues and the death of James Edwards Downs. Little is known about the toxicity of 2C-T-21 beyond this incident.

== Pharmacology ==
=== Pharmacodynamics ===
2C-T-21 shows high affinity for the serotonin 5-HT_{2A} and 5-HT_{2C} receptors (K_{i} = 27.7 nM and 72.7 nM, respectively). It has been found to act as a potent partial agonist of the serotonin 5-HT_{2A} receptor (EC_{50} = 9.7 nM; E_{max} = 69%) and of the serotonin 5-HT_{2B} receptor (EC_{50} = 102 nM; E_{max} = 32%). The drug produces the head-twitch response, a behavioral proxy of psychedelic effects, in rodents.

== Chemistry ==
=== Synthesis ===
The chemical synthesis of 2C-T-21 has been described.

=== Analogues ===
Analogues of 2C-T-21 include 2C-T-2, 2C-T-21.5, and 2C-T-22, among others.

== History ==
2C-T-21 was first described in the scientific literature by Alexander Shulgin and colleagues in a journal article in 1991. Shortly thereafter, it was described in greater detail by Shulgin in his 1991 book PiHKAL (Phenethylamines I Have Known and Loved). The potential applications of 2C-T-21 in psychedelic-assisted psychotherapy were explored by Myron Stolaroff. The drug was encountered as a novel designer drug online in 2014 and in the Netherlands in 2019.

== Society and culture ==
=== Legal status ===
==== Canada ====
As of October 31, 2016, 2C-T-21 is a controlled substance (Schedule III) in Canada.

==== United States ====
2C-T-21 is unscheduled and uncontrolled in the United States, but possession and sales of 2C-T-21 would probably be prosecuted under the Federal Analog Act because of its structural similarities to 2C-T-7 and its known potential to cause death. In the wake of Operation Web Tryp in July 2004, at least one distributor faced charges as a consequence of the death of James Downs from 2C-T-21 overdose.

== See also ==
- 2C (psychedelics)
