= Cyclopropyl group =

Chemical structure derived from cyclopropane

Chemical structure of the cyclopropyl group

A cyclopropyl group is a chemical structure derived from cyclopropane; it is typically produced in a cyclopropanation reaction. The group has an empirical formula of C_{3}H_{5} and chemical bonds from each of the three carbons to both of the other two.

== Structure and bonding ==
Due to the unfavoured bond angles (60°), cyclopropyl groups are highly strained. Two orbital models were proposed to describe the bonding situation. The Coulson-Moffit model uses bent bonds. The C-C bonds are formed by overlap of two sp-hybrid orbitals. To adapt to the small bond angle, there is some rehybridization resulting in sp^{~5}-hybrids for the ring bonds and sp^{~2} for the C-H bonds. This model resembles the banana bond model for C=C double bonds (τ bonds).

Alternatively the structure can be explained with the Walsh model. Here the two sp-hybrids forming the ring bond are separated into one sp^{2}-hybrid and one pure p-orbital. This corresponds to the π bond description of C=C double bonds.

Cyclopropyl groups are good donors in hyperconjugation resulting in a considerable stabilization of carbocations. In contrast to double bonds, stabilization of radicals is weaker and stabilization of carbanions is negligible. This is explained by the occupation of the π system with two more electrons, making the cyclopropyl methyl cation's HOMO isolobal to the allyl anion's HOMO.

== Literature ==
- Zvi Rappoport (Ed.), The Chemistry of the Cyclopropyl Group, Band 1, Wiley, Chichester u. a. O., 1987. Vol 2, Wiley, Chichester 1995, ISBN 0-471-94074-7.
