= Thio- =

Chemical prefix denoting the replacement of an oxygen atom with sulfur

The prefix thio-, when applied to a chemical, such as an ion, means that an oxygen atom in the compound has been replaced by a sulfur atom. This term is often used in organic chemistry. For example, from the word ether, referring to an oxygen-containing compound having the general chemical structure R−O−R′, where R and R′ are organic functional groups and O is an oxygen atom, comes the word thioether, which refers to an analogous compound with the general structure R−S−R′, where S is a sulfur atom covalently bonded to two organic groups. A chemical reaction involving the replacement of oxygen to sulfur is called thionation or thiation.

Thio- can be prefixed with di- and tri- in chemical nomenclature.

The word derives from Ancient Greek θεῖον (theîon) 'sulfur' (which occurs in Greek epic poetry as θέ(ϝ)ειον, théweion and may come from the same root as Latin fumus (Indo-European dh-w) and may have originally meant "fumigation substance".)

== Examples ==
- Thioamide
- Thiocyanate
- Thioether
- Thioketone
- Thiol
- Thiophene
- Thiourea
- Thiosulfate

== See also ==
- Organosulfur compounds
- IUPAC nomenclature of organic chemistry
