= 2C-T-2 =

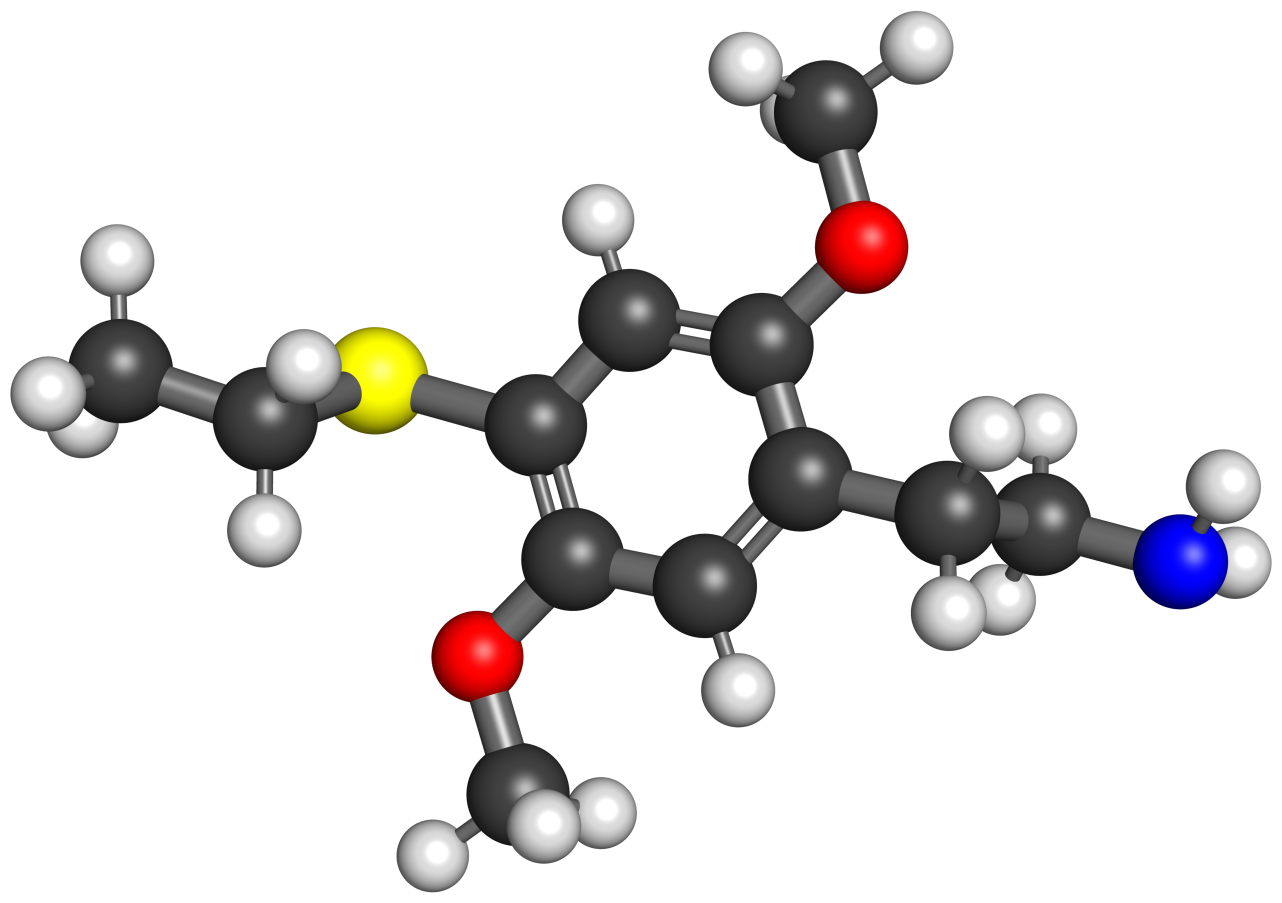

Clinical data
- Other names: 4-Ethylthio-2,5-dimethoxyphenethylamine; 2,5-Dimethoxy-4-ethylthiophenethylamine
- Routes of administration: Oral
- Drug class: Serotonin; 5-HT_{2} receptor agonist; Serotonergic psychedelic; Hallucinogen
- ATC code: None

Legal status
- Legal status: AU: S9 (Prohibited substance); BR: Class F2 (Prohibited psychotropics); CA: Schedule III; US: Schedule I

Pharmacokinetic data
- Onset of action: ≤1 hour
- Duration of action: 6–8 hours

Identifiers
- IUPAC name: 2-[4-(ethylsulfanyl)-2,5-dimethoxyphenyl]ethan-1-amine
- CAS Number: 207740-24-7
- PubChem CID: 12074193
- ChemSpider: 16787961
- UNII: WPS2KSX2TJ
- KEGG: C22715
- ChEMBL: ChEMBL339223
- CompTox Dashboard (EPA): DTXSID40174850
- ECHA InfoCard: 100.241.509

Chemical and physical data
- Formula: C_{12}H_{19}NO_{2}S
- Molar mass: 241.35 g·mol^{−1}
- 3D model (JSmol): Interactive image
- SMILES: CCSc1cc(OC)c(cc1OC)CCN
- InChI: InChI=1S/C12H19NO2S/c1-4-16-12-8-10(14-2)9(5-6-13)7-11(12)15-3/h7-8H,4-6,13H2,1-3H3; Key:HCWQGDLBIKOJPM-UHFFFAOYSA-N

2C-T-2, also known as 4-ethylthio-2,5-dimethoxyphenethylamine, is a psychedelic drug of the phenethylamine and 2C families. It is taken orally.

The drug acts as a serotonin 5-HT_{2} receptor agonist, including of the serotonin 5-HT_{2A} receptor.

2C-T-2 was discovered by Alexander Shulgin in 1981 and was first described in the scientific literature by Myron Stolaroff in 1990.

== Use and effects ==
In his book PiHKAL (Phenethylamines I Have Known and Loved) and other publications, Alexander Shulgin lists 2C-T-2's dose as 12 to 25 mg orally and its duration as 6 to 8 hours. However, a wider dose range of 12 to 30 mg orally has also been reported. Its onset is within 1 hour and peak effects occur after 1 to 2 hours.

The effects of 2C-T-2 have been reported to include closed-eye visuals, fantasy, mental changes, introspection, insights, emotional and empathy enhancement, euphoria, erotic enhancement, impairment, nausea, diarrhea, and some body load, among others. Shulgin rated it as one of his "magical half-dozen" most important psychedelic phenethylamines, along with mescaline, 2C-B, 2C-T-7, and others.

== Toxicity ==
A potential risk of neurotoxicity from 2C-T-2 use (and 2C chemical series in general) has been shown in serotonergic and dopaminergic neurons, however the assay used concentrations unlikely to translate to recreational use of the compound (>50 μM). This has also been shown to be magnified in serotonergic-containing cells with combined use of 2C series drugs with alcohol, MDMA, and methamphetamine.

Severe 'intoxication' on 2C series drugs has been observed as behavior that includes intense hallucinations, agitation, aggression, violence, dysphoria, hypertension, tachycardia, seizures, and hyperthermia.

== Interactions ==
2C-T-2 is metabolized by the monoamine oxidase (MAO) enzymes MAO-A and MAO-B. Monoamine oxidase inhibitors (MAOIs) such as phenelzine, tranylcypromine, moclobemide, and selegiline may potentiate the effects of 2C-T-2. This may result in overdose and serious toxicity.

== Pharmacology ==
=== Pharmacodynamics ===
2C-T-2 activities
| Target | Affinity (K_{i}, nM) |
|---|---|
| 5-HT_{1A} | 370–1,740 (K_{i}); 3,000 (EC_{50}); 76% (E_{max}) |
| 5-HT_{1B} | 858 |
| 5-HT_{1D} | 86 |
| 5-HT_{1E} | 415 |
| 5-HT_{1F} | ND |
| 5-HT_{2A} | 9–40 (K_{i}); 0.354–80 (EC_{50}); 67–107% (E_{max}) |
| 5-HT_{2B} | 6–69 (K_{i}); 130 (EC_{50}); 75% (E_{max}) |
| 5-HT_{2C} | 14–54 (K_{i}); 0.0233–3.8 (EC_{50}); 87–107% (E_{max}) |
| 5-HT_{3} | >10,000 |
| 5-HT_{4} | ND |
| 5-HT_{5A} | >10,000 |
| 5-HT_{6} | 1,362 |
| 5-HT_{7} | 969 |
| α_{1A} | 17,000 |
| α_{1B} | >10,000 |
| α_{1D} | ND |
| α_{2A} | 230–730 |
| α_{2B} | 982 |
| α_{2C} | 166 |
| β_{1} | 9,202 |
| β_{2} | 1,184 |
| β_{3} | ND |
| D_{1} | 15,000 |
| D_{2} | 2,795–5,100 |
| D_{3} | 1,835–11,000 |
| D_{4} | >10,000 |
| D_{5} | >10,000 |
| H_{1}–H_{4} | >10,000 |
| M_{1} | >10,000 |
| M_{2} | >10,000 |
| M_{3} | 692 |
| M_{4} | >10,000 |
| M_{5} | 1,502 |
| I_{1} | 2,080 |
| σ_{1} | 3,870 |
| σ_{2} | >10,000 |
| TAAR1 | 2,200 (K_{i}) (mouse); 40 (K_{i}) (rat); 96 (EC_{50}) (mouse); 4,300 (EC_{50}) (rat) >10,000 (EC_{50}) (human); 54% (E_{max}) (mouse); 86% (E_{max}) (rat) |
| SERT | 13,000 (K_{i}); 62,000 (IC_{50}); IA (EC_{50}) |
| NET | >30,000 (K_{i}); 153,000 (IC_{50}); IA (EC_{50}) |
| DAT | >30,000 (K_{i}); 332,000 (IC_{50}); IA (EC_{50}) |
| MAO-A | ND (IC_{50}) |
| MAO-B | ND (IC_{50}) |
Notes: The smaller the value, the more avidly the drug binds to the site. All proteins are human unless otherwise specified. Refs:

2C-T-2 acts as a serotonin 5-HT_{2} receptor agonist, including of the serotonin 5-HT_{2A} and 5-HT_{2C} receptors. The mechanism of action that produces 2C-T-2's hallucinogenic effects is shown to be most likely a result from action as a serotonin 5-HT_{2A}, 5-HT_{2B}, and 5-HT_{2C} serotonin receptor agonist, a mechanism of action shared by the psychedelic tryptamines and phenethylamines to varying degrees. 2C-T-2 has also shown to be a partial agonist of adrenergic receptors.

== Chemistry ==
=== Synthesis ===
The chemical synthesis of 2C-T-2 has been described.

=== Analogues ===
Analogues of 2C-T-2 include 2C-T (2C-T-1), 2C-T-4, 2C-T-7, Aleph-2, and 25T2-NBOMe, among others.

== History ==
2C-T-2 was first synthesized by Alexander Shulgin in 1981. He discovered its psychedelic effects that same year. The drug was first described in the scientific literature by Myron Stolaroff in 1990. Subsequently, it was described in greater detail in a 1991 publication by Shulgin and colleagues and in his 1991 book PiHKAL (Phenethylamines I Have Known and Loved). Following this, 2C-T-2 emerged as a novel designer drug in the 1990s.

== Society and culture ==
=== Legal status ===
==== Argentina ====
2C-T-2 is a controlled substance in Argentina along with 2C-B and 2C-I.

==== Australia ====
2C-T-2 is considered a Schedule 9 prohibited substance in Australia under the Poisons Standard (October 2015). A Schedule 9 substance is a substance which may be abused or misused, the manufacture, possession, sale or use of which should be prohibited by law except when required for medical or scientific research, or for analytical, teaching or training purposes with approval of Commonwealth and/or State or Territory Health Authorities.

==== Canada ====
As of October 31, 2016, 2C-T-2 is a controlled substance (Schedule III) in Canada.

==== China ====
As of October 2015 2C-T-2 is a controlled substance in China.

==== Finland ====
2C-T-2 is classified as a narcotic drug in Finland.

==== Netherlands ====
The Netherlands became the first country in the world to ban 2C-T-2, and classify it as a hard drug, by law. In April, 1999, 2C-T-2 became a list I drug of the Opium Law.

==== Sweden ====
Schedule I in Sweden. 2C-T-2 was first classified as "health hazard" under the act Lagen om förbud mot vissa hälsofarliga varor (translated Act on the Prohibition of Certain Goods Dangerous to Health) as of April 1, 1999, under SFS 1999:58 that made it illegal to sell or possess. The Riksdag added 2C-T-2 to Narcotic Drugs Punishments Act under Swedish schedule I ("substances, plant materials and fungi which normally do not have medical use") as of March 16, 2004, published by Medical Products Agency (MPA) in regulation LVFS 2004:3 listed as 2C-T-2, 2,5-dimetoxi-4-etyltiofenetylamin.

==== United Kingdom ====
2C-T-2 and all other compounds featured in PiHKAL are illegal drugs in the United Kingdom.

==== United States ====
2C-T-2 is specifically listed as a schedule I substance under SEC. 1152 of S.3187: Food and Drug Administration Safety and Innovation Act of 2012.

== See also ==
- 2C (psychedelics)
- Aleph-2
