= Operation Web Tryp =

American DEA investigation into 'grey market' drugs

- Date: July 21, 2004 (end date)
- Type: Law enforcement operation
- Cause: Investigation of "research chemical" websites
- Motive: To stop the distribution of unscheduled tryptamines and phenethylamines
- Target: Websites selling "grey market" drugs
- Outcome: 10 arrests shutdown of 5 websites seizure of assets
- Deaths: 2 (attributed to products from the websites)
- Injuries: 14 non-fatal overdoses
- Arrests: 10 (Operation Web Tryp); 22 (Operation Ismene)
- Convicted: Website owner sentenced to 410 years
- Charges: Drug distribution

Operation Web Tryp was a United States Drug Enforcement Administration operation that ended on July 21, 2004 with the arrests of 10 persons. Its purpose was to investigate web sites suspected of distribution of unscheduled, unregulated tryptamines and phenethylamines of questionable legality. This trade in "grey market" drugs, which were not explicitly illegal but potentially prosecutable as drug analogs, became known as the "research chemical" trade; a euphemism to suggest that the chemicals were being sold for industrial or academic research rather than human consumption.

Five websites were involved in Operation Web Tryp. One of these websites, pondman.nu, was allegedly taking in U.S. $20,000 per week and grossed $700,000 before being shut down. Another, racresearch.com, reportedly grossed $500,000 in 14 months.

In 2005, a court ruled that AMT sold by pondman.nu caused the April 2002 death of an 18-year-old male in upstate New York and the site's owner was sentenced to 410 years in prison. The DEA also alleged a product sold by americanchemicalsupply.com caused the death of a 22-year-old Louisiana man. Fourteen other non-fatal overdose incidents requiring hospitalization were also cited by the DEA.

In December 2004, using credit card information provided by the DEA, British police arrested 22 UK residents who had purchased 2C-I through the seized web sites (Operation Ismene). No one was jailed and most were released without charge. No customers in the United States were known to be arrested.

== Legality ==
Although these chemicals were not yet scheduled, a long shadow was cast on their legality by the 1986 Federal Analog Act. This Act and the United States v. Forbes Colorado federal district court case stipulated that the burden of proof, in regards for the intention for human consumption, was on the government if any prosecution under the Federal Analog Act was to occur. Additionally, legal ambiguities regarding the legality of certain analogs of scheduled substances had been established in the aforementioned court case (In particular, the similarities of AET and DMT were debated).
