= 2C-T-7 =

Psychedelic phenthylamine drug

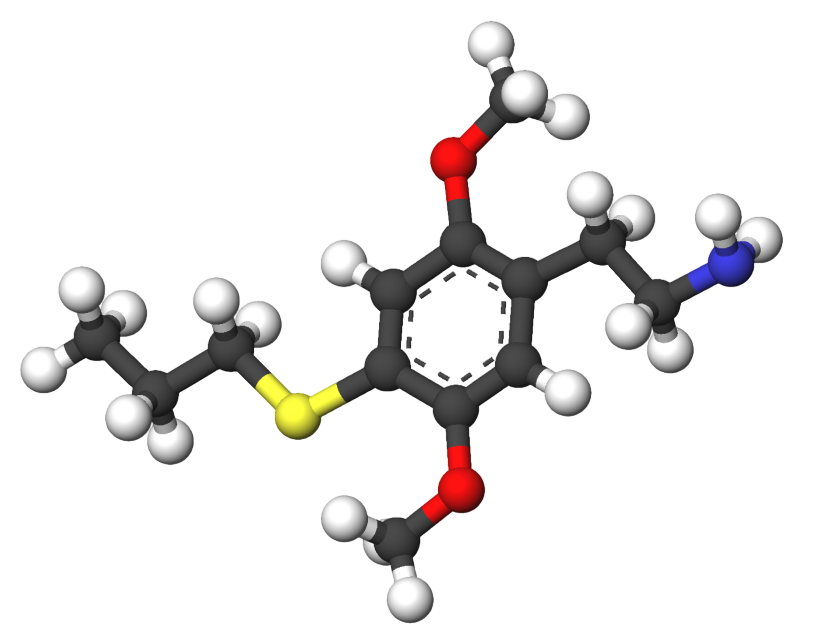

Clinical data
- Other names: 2,5-Dimethoxy-4-propylthiophenethylamine; 2,5-Dimethoxy-4-propylsulfanylphenethylamine; 4-Propylthio-2,5-dimethoxyphenethylamine; 4-Propylsulfanyl-2,5-dimethoxyphenethylamine; Blue Mystic; Tweety-Bird Mescaline
- Routes of administration: Oral
- Drug class: Serotonin 5-HT_{2} receptor agonist; Serotonergic psychedelic; Hallucinogen
- ATC code: None

Legal status
- Legal status: BR: Class F2 (Prohibited psychotropics); CA: Schedule III; US: Schedule I

Pharmacokinetic data
- Onset of action: 2 hours
- Duration of action: 8–15 hours

Identifiers
- IUPAC name: 2-[2,5-dimethoxy-4-(propylsulfanyl)phenyl]ethan-1-amine
- CAS Number: 207740-26-9
- PubChem CID: 24728635
- ChemSpider: 21106233
- UNII: TJG366J9BA
- KEGG: C22737
- ChEMBL: ChEMBL126432
- CompTox Dashboard (EPA): DTXSID90861566

Chemical and physical data
- Formula: C_{13}H_{21}NO_{2}S
- Molar mass: 255.38 g·mol^{−1}
- 3D model (JSmol): Interactive image
- Melting point: 206 to 207 °C (403 to 405 °F)
- SMILES: COc1cc(SCCC)c(cc1CCN)OC
- InChI: InChI=1S/C13H21NO2S/c1-4-7-17-13-9-11(15-2)10(5-6-14)8-12(13)16-3/h8-9H,4-7,14H2,1-3H3; Key:OLEVEPDJOFPJTF-UHFFFAOYSA-N

2C-T-7, also known as 4-propylthio-2,5-dimethoxyphenethylamine or as Blue Mystic or 7th Heaven, is a psychedelic drug of the phenethylamine and 2C families. It is taken orally.

The drug acts as a serotonin 5-HT_{2} receptor agonist, including of the serotonin 5-HT_{2A} receptor.

2C-T-7 was first described in the scientific literature by Myron Stolaroff in 1990. It was developed by Alexander Shulgin and colleagues and was described in greater detail by them in 1991, including in Shulgin's book PiHKAL (Phenethylamines I Have Known and Loved).

== Use and effects ==
In his book PiHKAL (Phenethylamines I Have Known and Loved) and other publications, Alexander Shulgin lists 2C-T-7's dose as 10 to 30 mg orally and its duration as 8 to 15 hours. Its onset is said to be 2 hours.

The effects of 2C-T-7 have been reported to include closed-eye visuals like Escher-like graphics, open-eye visuals including visual movement, flowing, aliveness, velvety appearance, and increased depth perception, emotional fluctuations, insights, music enhancement, nausea, bodily tension, and muscle tightness, among others. Shulgin rated it as one of the "magical half-dozen" most important psychedelic phenethylamines, together with mescaline, 2C-B, and 2C-T-2.

== Interactions ==
2C-T-7 is metabolized by the monoamine oxidase (MAO) enzymes MAO-A and MAO-B. Monoamine oxidase inhibitors (MAOIs) such as phenelzine, tranylcypromine, moclobemide, and selegiline may potentiate the effects of 2C-T-7. This may result in overdose and serious toxicity.

== Toxicity and deaths ==
There have been at least three reported deaths related to 2C-T-7 use as of August 2007, mainly at insufflated (snorted) doses of 30 mg or more. In the fall of 2000, a young healthy male died following insufflation of an excessive amount of 2C-T-7. Two additional deaths reported in April 2001 have been linked to 2C-T-7. These two deaths were reported by the DEA as being the result of the co-abuse of 2C-T-7 with MDMA.

In January 2002, Rolling Stone published an article about 2C-T-7 entitled "The New (legal) Killer Drug". Although the article suggested that the drug was legal, the legal status of 2C-T-7 was ambiguous at the time due to the United States' Federal Analogue Act. A detailed response on the website disinfo.com challenged the accuracy of much of the reporting in the aforementioned Rolling Stone article. 2C-T-7 has since been officially made illegal and declared a schedule 1 substance in the United States.

The Partnership for a Drug-Free America reported in 2006 that 2C-T-7 can be lethal even in small doses; however, they provide no source for their claim and of the three known deaths (as of August 2007) of 2C-T-7 intoxicated individuals, all involved either uncommonly large insufflated doses or the concomitant ingestion of other stimulants such as ephedrine and/or MDMA.

All of the three aforementioned known deaths of individuals under the influence of 2C-T-7 occurred in those known to be either intoxicated with other stimulants such as ephedrine or MDMA (which are known to be potentially lethal in certain situations or at excessive doses) or after the individual insufflated an amount of 2C-T-7 much greater than necessary to induce the full range of effects typically sought after by users of the drug; for example, the reported 35 mg insufflated dose taken by the individual who died in the fall of 2000. This reported dose was characterized as "excessive" by the United States DEA.

== Pharmacology ==
=== Pharmacodynamics ===
2C-T-7 activities
| Target | Affinity (K_{i}, nM) |
|---|---|
| 5-HT_{1A} | 520–878 |
| 5-HT_{1B} | ND |
| 5-HT_{1D} | ND |
| 5-HT_{1E} | ND |
| 5-HT_{1F} | ND |
| 5-HT_{2A} | 5.3–6.5 (K_{i}); 1.2–130 (EC_{50}); 49–174% (E_{max}) |
| 5-HT_{2B} | ND (K_{i}); 52–350 (EC_{50}); 45–46% (E_{max}) |
| 5-HT_{2C} | 39–54 (K_{i}); ND (EC_{50}); ND (E_{max}) |
| 5-HT_{3} | ND |
| 5-HT_{4} | ND |
| 5-HT_{5A} | ND |
| 5-HT_{6} | ND |
| 5-HT_{7} | ND |
| α_{1A} | 13,000 |
| α_{1B}, α_{1D} | ND |
| α_{2A} | 180–335 |
| α_{2B}, α_{2C} | ND |
| β_{1}–β_{3} | ND |
| D_{1} | 15,000 |
| D_{2} | 5,000 |
| D_{3} | 7,500 |
| D_{4}, D_{5} | ND |
| H_{1} | >25,000 |
| H_{2}–H_{4} | ND |
| M_{1}–M_{5} | ND |
| I_{1} | ND |
| σ_{1}, σ_{2} | ND |
| TAAR1 | 311–560 (K_{i}) (mouse); 10–33 (K_{i}) (rat); 910 (EC_{50}) (mouse); 79 (EC_{50}) (rat); 30,000 (EC_{50}) (human); 67% (E_{max}) (mouse); 83% (E_{max}) (rat) |
| SERT | 12,000 (K_{i}); 44,000 (IC_{50}); ND (EC_{50}) |
| NET | 27,000 (K_{i}); 135,000 (IC_{50}); ND (EC_{50}) |
| DAT | 34,000 (K_{i}); 261,000 (IC_{50}); ND (EC_{50}) |
| MAO-A | 46,000 (IC_{50}) |
| MAO-B | 180,000 (IC_{50}) |
Notes: The smaller the value, the more avidly the drug binds to the site. All proteins are human unless otherwise specified. Refs:

2C-T-7 is a serotonin 5-HT_{2A} receptor agonist, among other interactions. The mechanism that produces the psychedelic effects of 2C-T-7 is most likely to result from serotonin 5-HT_{2A} receptor agonism in the brain, a mechanism of action shared by most currently-known hallucinogenic tryptamines and phenethylamines. 2C-T-7 has structural and pharmacodynamic properties similar to those of 2C-T-2.

== Chemistry ==
=== Synthesis ===
The chemical synthesis of 2C-T-7 has been described.

=== Analogues ===
Analogues of 2C-T-7 include 2C-T, 2C-T-2, 2C-T-4, other 2C-T derivatives, and Aleph-7, among others. Methyl-2C-T-7, the N-methyl derivative of 2C-T-7, has been synthesized, but it has not been tested in humans.

== History ==
2C-T-7 was first described in the scientific literature by Myron Stolaroff by 1990. It was developed by Alexander Shulgin and Peyton Jacob III. Subsequently, 2C-T-7 was described in greater detail by Shulgin and colleagues in 1991.

Up until Operation Web Tryp and three deaths, two of which involved the use of other drugs in addition to 2C-T-7, and one which involved an excessive insufflated dose, 2C-T-7 was sold commercially in Dutch and Japanese smartshops and online.

== Society and culture ==
=== Legal status ===
Around the year 2000, 2C-T-7 began to change from an obscure chemical to a drug used at parties and clubs in North America and Europe as it became available through a number of grey-market commercial vendors. This aroused the attention of the authorities, and many countries have since scheduled the chemical.

==== Australia ====
In Australia, 2C-T-2 and 2C-T-7 are covered by the country's analogue drug laws.

==== Canada ====
As of October 31, 2016, 2C-T-7 is a controlled substance (Schedule III) in Canada.

==== China ====
As of October 2015 2C-T-7 is a controlled substance in China.

==== Finland ====
2C-T-7 is scheduled in the "government decree on substances, preparations and plants considered to be narcotic drugs".

==== Germany ====
2C-T-7 is scheduled in Germany. (BTMG)

==== Netherlands ====
The Netherlands was the first country in the world to ban 2C-T-7, after being sold in smartshops for a short period. After 2C-T-2 was first banned, 2C-T-7 quickly appeared on the market, but was soon banned as well. 2C-T-7 is a list I drug of the Opium Law.

==== Sweden ====
Schedule I in Sweden. 2C-T-7 was first classified as "health hazard" under the act Lagen om förbud mot vissa hälsofarliga varor (translated Act on the Prohibition of Certain Goods Dangerous to Health) as of April 1, 1999, under SFS 1999:58 that made it illegal to sell or possess.

==== United Kingdom ====
In 1999, Alexander Shulgin was sent a copy of a letter from the British Home Office to several of its administrative associates that in effect placed all compounds listed in PiHKAL into Class A.

==== United States ====
On September 20, 2002, 2C-T-7 was classified as a Schedule I substance in the United States by an emergency ruling by the DEA. On March 18, 2004, the DEA published a Final Rule in the Federal Register permanently placing 2C-T-7 in Schedule I. (69 FR 12794)

As of April 2024, law enforcement have encountered 2C-T-7 in 16 states, with the highest number of encounters being in Florida. Purchases made over the internet are believed by the DEA to be the most common source by which users of the drug acquire it in the United States, and one laboratory manufacturing the drug was discovered by police in Las Vegas, Nevada.

== See also ==
- 2C (psychedelics)
