= TFMBOX =

Clinical data
- Other names: "Compound 5c"
- Drug class: Serotonin receptor modulator; Serotonergic psychedelic; Hallucinogen

Identifiers
- IUPAC name: 7-methoxy-8-(trifluoromethyl)-2,3,4,5-tetrahydro-1-benzoxepin-4-amine
- CAS Number: 774160-02-0 173989-93-0 (HCl)

Chemical and physical data
- Formula: C_{12}H_{14}F_{3}NO_{2}
- Molar mass: 261.244 g·mol^{−1}
- 3D model (JSmol): Interactive image
- SMILES: COc1cc2CC(N)CCOc2cc1C(F)(F)F
- InChI: InChI=1S/C12H14F3NO2/c1-17-11-5-7-4-8(16)2-3-18-10(7)6-9(11)12(13,14)15/h5-6,8H,2-4,16H2,1H3; Key:NAOXZRLWFAOHAP-UHFFFAOYSA-N

TFMBOX is a putative serotonergic psychedelic of the phenethylamine and benzoxepin ("BOX") families. It is the cyclized phenethylamine analogue of DOTFM and 2C-TFM in which the α carbon has been connected to the 2-methoxy group via an ethyl chain to form a benzoxepin ring system.

== Pharmacology ==
=== Pharmacodynamics ===
The drug was assessed at and showed affinity for the serotonin 5-HT_{2A} and 5-HT_{1A} receptors, with K_{i} values of 340 nM and 1,300 nM, respectively. Its affinity for the serotonin 5-HT_{2A} receptor was about 15-fold lower than that of DOB and DOI, whereas its affinity for the serotonin 5-HT_{1A} receptor was the same as that of DOI and was about half that of DOB. TFMBOX also very weakly inhibited the reuptake of serotonin (IC_{50} = 9,900 nM), but did not affect dopamine or norepinephrine reuptake (IC_{50} = >50,000–100,000 nM). The drug fully substituted for LSD in rodent drug discrimination tests, albeit with about one-third of the potency of DOB and 2C-B.

== Chemistry ==
=== Analogues ===
Other "BOX" drugs that have been assessed include BOX (the cyclized analogue of 2C-H and DOH), BBOX (the cyclized analogue of 2C-B and DOB), and IBOX (the cyclized analogue of 2C-I and DOI). However, BBOX and IBOX only partially substituted for LSD in drug discrimination tests.

Chemical structures of BOX compounds
BOX

TFMBOX

BBOX

IBOX

== History ==
TFMBOX was first described in the scientific literature by Nicholas Cozzi, a student of David E. Nichols, by 1994.

== See also ==
- Cyclized phenethylamine
- 2CB-Ind
- 2CB7
- 6-AB
- CT-5126
- Lorcaserin
- TCB-2
