= Β-Methyl-DOM =

β-Methyl-DOM

Clinical data
- Other names: β-Me-DOM; 4-Methyl-2,5-dimethoxy-β-methylamphetamine; 2,5-Dimethoxy-4-methyl-β-methylamphetamine
- ATC code: None

Identifiers
- IUPAC name: 3-(2,5-dimethoxy-4-methylphenyl)butan-2-amine
- CAS Number: 744980-91-4
- PubChem CID: 57363059
- ChemSpider: 75117994

Chemical and physical data
- Formula: C_{13}H_{21}NO_{2}
- Molar mass: 223.316 g·mol^{−1}
- 3D model (JSmol): Interactive image
- SMILES: CC1=CC(=C(C=C1OC)C(C)C(C)N)OC
- InChI: InChI=1S/C13H21NO2/c1-8-6-13(16-5)11(7-12(8)15-4)9(2)10(3)14/h6-7,9-10H,14H2,1-5H3; Key:MTAIXXOMFWYAKQ-UHFFFAOYSA-N

β-Methyl-DOM, or β-Me-DOM, also known as 4-methyl-2,5-dimethoxy-β-methylamphetamine, is a chemical compound of the phenethylamine, amphetamine, and DOx families related to DOM. It has two notable enantiomers, Daphne (threo-β-Me-DOM) and Elvira (erythro-β-Me-DOM). These compounds are two of Alexander Shulgin's "ten classic ladies", a series of methylated DOM derivatives that Shulgin explored as part of DOM structure–activity relationship research.

Shulgin partially completed the syntheses of Daphne and Elvira, but did not fully synthesize nor test them and their properties and effects are unknown. β-Methyl-DOM has been reported to have virtually no hallucinogen-like activity in animals, but did produce hyperthermia at high doses.

The compound was first described in the scientific literature by F. Aldous and colleagues in 1974 and was further described by Shulgin, as the enantiomers Daphne and Elvira, in his book PiHKAL (Phenethylamines I Have Known and Loved) in 1991. It is a controlled substance in Canada under phenethylamine blanket-ban language. The drug is not an explicitly controlled substance in the United States, but may be considered scheduled as an isomer of DOET.

Chemical structures of β-methyl-DOM enantiomers
Daphne (threo-β-Me-DOM)

Elvira (erythro-β-Me-DOM)

== See also ==
- DOx (psychedelics)
- β-Methyl-2C-B (BMB)
- DMCPA, 2CB-Ind, and TCB-2
- ZC-B, 2C-B-PYR, and LPH-5
