= Β-Methyl-2C-B =

Chemical compound

β-Methyl-2C-B

Clinical data
- Other names: BMB; 4-Bromo-2,5-dimethoxy-β-methylphenethylamine
- Routes of administration: Oral
- Drug class: Psychoactive drug

Legal status
- Legal status: UK: In General Unscheduled

Pharmacokinetic data
- Duration of action: ~8 hours

Identifiers
- IUPAC name: 2-(4-bromo-2,5-dimethoxyphenyl)propan-1-amine
- CAS Number: 52432-70-9
- PubChem CID: 6452643
- ChemSpider: 4955068
- CompTox Dashboard (EPA): DTXSID80966857

Chemical and physical data
- Formula: C_{11}H_{16}BrNO_{2}
- Molar mass: 274.158 g·mol^{−1}
- 3D model (JSmol): Interactive image
- SMILES: CC(CN)C1=CC(=C(C=C1OC)Br)OC
- InChI: InChI=1S/C11H16BrNO2/c1-7(6-13)8-4-11(15-3)9(12)5-10(8)14-2/h4-5,7H,6,13H2,1-3H3; Key:YJJFYOKEGOFNFA-UHFFFAOYSA-N

β-Methyl-2C-B (BMB), also known as 4-bromo-2,5-dimethoxy-β-methylphenethylamine, is a psychoactive drug of the phenethylamine and 2C families related to the BOx drugs. It is the β-methyl derivative of 2C-B and a structural isomer of DOB (α-methyl-2C-B), but is less potent than either of these drugs. The drug has around half the potency of 2C-B itself, with effects occurring at a dose of around 20 mg orally and with a duration of approximately 8 hours. Moreover, its effects were described as very different from those of 2C-B and effects typical of 2C-B were said to be largely absent. It has two possible enantiomers but their activity has not been tested separately. BMB was described by Daniel Trachsel in his 2013 book Phenethylamine: Von der Struktur zur Funktion (Phenethylamines: From Structure to Function). It may be a controlled substance in Canada. The drug is not an explicitly controlled substance in the United States.

== See also ==
- BOx (psychedelics)
- 2C (psychedelics)
- β-Methyl-DOM
- βk-2C-B (β-keto-2C-B) and BOB (β-methoxy-2C-B)
- DMCPA, 2CB-Ind, and TCB-2
- ZC-B, 2C-B-PYR, and LPH-5
