= C11H16BrNO2 =

Molecular formula

The molecular formula C_{11}H_{16}BrNO_{2} (molar mass: 274.15 g/mol) may refer to:

- 2,5-Dimethoxy-3-bromoamphetamine
- 2,5-Dimethoxy-4-bromoamphetamine
- 4-Bromo-3,5-dimethoxyamphetamine
- Meta-DOB
- β-Methyl-2C-B
- N-Methyl-2C-B
- 2CB-2-EtO
- 2CB-5-EtO
