= 2CB7 =

Clinical data
- Other names: 2C-B-5-hemiFLY-β7
- Drug class: Serotonin receptor modulator; Serotonin 5-HT_{2A} receptor modulator
- ATC code: None

Identifiers
- IUPAC name: (5-bromo-7-methoxy-3-oxatricyclo[6.4.1.0^{4,13}]trideca-4,6,8(13)-trien-9-yl)methanamine
- CAS Number: 912342-25-7
- PubChem CID: 16086376
- ChemSpider: 17245030

Chemical and physical data
- Formula: C_{14}H_{18}BrNO_{2}
- Molar mass: 312.207 g·mol^{−1}
- 3D model (JSmol): Interactive image
- SMILES: COC1=CC(=C2C3=C1C(CCCC3CO2)CN)Br
- InChI: InChI=1S/C14H18BrNO2/c1-17-11-5-10(15)14-13-9(7-18-14)4-2-3-8(6-16)12(11)13/h5,8-9H,2-4,6-7,16H2,1H3; Key:IKKCIFAOANLPEY-UHFFFAOYSA-N

2CB7, also known as 2C-B-5-hemiFLY-β7, is a serotonin receptor modulator of the phenethylamine, 2C, and benzofuran families related to 2C-B. It is a cyclized phenethylamine or conformationally restrained derivative of 2C-B in which the 5-methoxy group has been cyclized into a dihydrofuran ring and the β position has been connected with the dihydrofuran ring via a propyl group to form a cycloheptane ring to form a tricyclic structure.

The compound has syn and anti stereoisomers, with these isomers also being racemic mixtures of (+)- and (–)- enantiomers. The isomers of 2CB7 show affinity for the serotonin 5-HT_{2A} receptor, with values (K_{i}) of 74 to 170 nM for syn-2CB7 and 170 to 200 nM for anti-2CB7. These affinities were dramatically lower than those of 2C-B (K_{i} = 0.66–0.88 nM).

2CB7 was first described in the scientific literature by Michael Robert Braden and David E. Nichols and colleagues in 2006. It was developed as part of scientific research into serotonin 5-HT_{2A} receptor ligand interactions.

== See also ==
- 2C (psychedelics)
- lorcaserin
- Cyclized phenethylamine
- FLY (psychedelics)
- TFMBOX
- 2C-B-5-hemiFLY-α6 (BNAP)
- TCB-2
- 2CB-Ind
- jimscaline
- AMMT
