= C12H14BrNO2 =

The molecular formula C_{12}H_{14}BrNO_{2} may refer to:

- 2C-B-FLY
- 2C-B-5-hemiFLY-α6
