= C17H20BrNO3 =

The molecular formula C_{17}H_{20}BrNO_{3} (molar mass: 366.255 g/mol) may refer to:

- 25B-NBOH
- 5-DM-25B-NBOMe
