= 2C-B-5-hemiFLY-α6 =

Clinical data
- Other names: BNAP
- Drug class: Serotonin receptor modulator
- ATC code: None

Identifiers
- IUPAC name: 8-bromo-6-methoxy-2a,3,4,5-tetrahydro-2H-naphtho[1,8-bc]furan-4-amine
- ChemSpider: 21376194

Chemical and physical data
- Formula: C_{12}H_{14}BrNO_{2}
- Molar mass: 284.153 g·mol^{−1}
- 3D model (JSmol): Interactive image
- SMILES: COc1cc(Br)c2c3c1CC(N)CC3CO2
- InChI: InChI=1S/C12H14BrNO2/c1-15-10-4-9(13)12-11-6(5-16-12)2-7(14)3-8(10)11/h4,6-7H,2-3,5,14H2,1H3; Key:CLZKGXPLDDUCQZ-UHFFFAOYSA-N

2C-B-5-hemiFLY-α6, also known as BNAP, is a serotonin receptor modulator of the phenethylamine and FLY families related to the psychedelic drugs 2C-B and DOB. It is a cyclized phenethylamine with a partial ergoline like chemical structure.

It is a tricyclic structure that mimics the A, B, and C rings of LSD.

== Pharmacology ==
The more active syn stereoisomer of the drug shows high affinity for the human serotonin 5-HT_{2A} and 5-HT_{2C} receptors with agonist radioligands (K_{i} = 13–16 nM and 4–6 nM, respectively). These affinities were 20- to 30-fold lower than those of the related drug DOB-FLY. The stereoisomer also showed much weaker affinity for the serotonin 5-HT_{2B} receptor with agonist radioligand (K_{i} = 280 nM) and for the serotonin 5-HT_{1A} receptor (K_{i} = 960 nM). Affinities for rat serotonin receptors and for human serotonin receptors with antagonist radioligands were much lower. A subsequent study showed the more active enantiomer to be a partial agonist of the rat serotonin 5-HT_{2A} receptor (EC_{50} = 2,090 nM; E_{max} = 63%). Neither stereoisomer produced LSD-like effects in rodent drug discrimination tests. Unexpectedly, the more active stereoisomer showed relatively high affinity for the five muscarinic acetylcholine receptors (K_{i} = 12–81 nM).

== History ==
2C-B-F-hemiFLY-α6 was first described in the scientific literature by 1995. The compound resulted in research that discovered that phenethylamines and lysergamides do not necessarily interact with the serotonin 5-HT_{2A} receptor in the same manner. Following the negative findings, further investigation in this area was discontinued.

== Analogues ==
An analogue of 2C-B-5-hemiFLY-α6 with the amine modified showed not only high-affinity partial agonism at the serotonin 5-HT_{2A} receptor but also partially substituted for LSD and/or DOI in rodent tests.

== See also ==
- Cyclized phenethylamine
- Substituted methoxyphenethylamine
- FLY (psychedelics)
- Partial ergoline
- 2CB7 (2C-B-5-hemiFLY-β7)
- RU-27849
- FHATHBIN
