= C18H19NO3 =

The molecular formula C_{18}H_{19}NO_{3} (molar mass: 297.35 g/mol, exact mass: 297.1365 u) may refer to:

- Oripavine, an opiate
- Codeinone
- Clausenamide
- 11-Methoxyasimilobine
