= 2C-B-AN =

Clinical data
- Other names: 2CB-AN; 2C-B-Aminonitrile; Brolphetaminil; 4-Bromo-N-(α′-cyanobenzyl)-2,5-dimethoxyphenethylamine; 4-Bromo-N-(cyano(phenyl)methyl)-2,5-dimethoxyphenethylamine
- Routes of administration: Oral
- Drug class: Serotonin 5-HT_{2} receptor agonist; Serotonin 5-HT_{2A} receptor agonist; Serotonergic psychedelic; Hallucinogen
- ATC code: None

Pharmacokinetic data
- Metabolites: 2C-B
- Onset of action: 1 hour
- Duration of action: 5–8 hours

Identifiers
- IUPAC name: 2-[2-(4-bromo-2,5-dimethoxyphenyl)ethylamino]-2-phenylacetonitrile
- PubChem CID: 165412129
- UNII: F6VF6U8BHV

Chemical and physical data
- Formula: C_{18}H_{19}BrN_{2}O_{2}
- Molar mass: 375.266 g·mol^{−1}
- 3D model (JSmol): Interactive image
- SMILES: COC1=CC(=C(C=C1CCNC(C#N)C2=CC=CC=C2)OC)Br
- InChI: InChI=1S/C18H19BrN2O2/c1-22-17-11-15(19)18(23-2)10-14(17)8-9-21-16(12-20)13-6-4-3-5-7-13/h3-7,10-11,16,21H,8-9H2,1-2H3; Key:ZQUGFGBAFZUJFB-UHFFFAOYSA-N

2C-B-AN, also known as 4-bromo-N-(α′-cyanobenzyl)-2,5-dimethoxyphenethylamine or as brolphetaminil, is a psychedelic drug of the phenethylamine, 2C, and N-benzylphenethylamine families related to 2C-B. It is the derivative of 2C-B with a modified NBOMe-like N-(α′-cyanobenzyl) substitution. The drug is chemically unstable and has been found to be a prodrug of 2C-B in vivo. It is active at a dose of 50 mg orally and has a duration of 5 to 8 hours. However, a wider dose range of 30 to 100 mg or more has also been reported. 2C-B-AN has been described as producing stimulation and certain visual alterations. It was described in the scientific literature by Daniel Trachsel in 2013, who cited personal communication with P. Rausch in 2009 as the source for the information. 2C-B-AN was encountered as a novel designer drug in Europe by 2016. It may be a controlled substance in Canada under phenethylamine blanket-ban language. The drug is not an explicitly controlled substance in the United States.

== See also ==
- 2C (psychedelics)
- 25-NB
- Amphetaminil (N-(α′-cyanobenzyl)amphetamine)
- 2C-B-OH
- 25B-NBOMe
