= 2-OH-2C-B =

Clinical data
- Other names: 2-Hydroxy-2C-B; 2-O-Desmethyl-2C-B; 2-DM-2C-B; B-2-HMPEA; 2-Hydroxy-5-methoxy-4-bromophenethylamine; 4-Bromo-2-hydroxy-5-methoxyphenethylamine
- Drug class: Serotonin receptor modulator; Serotonin 5-HT_{2A} receptor agonist
- ATC code: None

Identifiers
- IUPAC name: 2-(2-aminoethyl)-5-bromo-4-methoxyphenol
- PubChem CID: 84705552
- ChemSpider: 23254187

Chemical and physical data
- Formula: C_{9}H_{12}BrNO_{2}
- Molar mass: 246.104 g·mol^{−1}
- 3D model (JSmol): Interactive image
- SMILES: COC1=C(C=C(C(=C1)CCN)O)Br
- InChI: InChI=1S/C9H12BrNO2/c1-13-9-4-6(2-3-11)8(12)5-7(9)10/h4-5,12H,2-3,11H2,1H3; Key:LTIUWTXENMGCDK-UHFFFAOYSA-N

2-OH-2C-B, also known as 2-O-desmethyl-2C-B (2-DM-2C-B) or as 4-bromo-2-hydroxy-5-methoxyphenethylamine (B-2-HMPEA), is a serotonin receptor modulator of the phenethylamine family related to the 2C psychedelic 2C-B (2,5-dimethoxy-4-bromophenethylamine). It is the 2-O-demethylated analogue of 2C-B. The drug is a potent agonist of the serotonin 5-HT_{2A} receptor, with an affinity (K_{i}) of 0.92 nM, an EC_{50} of 4.3 nM, and an E_{max} of 93%. For comparison, 2C-B had an affinity (K_{i}) of 0.64 nM, an EC_{50} of 3.3 nM, and an E_{max} of 76%. 2-OH-2C-B is a known metabolite of 2C-B in rodents and humans. The predicted log P of 2-OH-2C-B is 1.5 and of 2C-B is 2.1. The drug was first described in the scientific literature by 2003 and its pharmacology was described by 2013.

== See also ==
- 2C (psychedelics)
- 2-DM-DOM and 5-DM-DOM
- 5-DM-25B-NBOMe
