= 2C-B =

Psychedelic drug

- Molecular structure of 2C-B

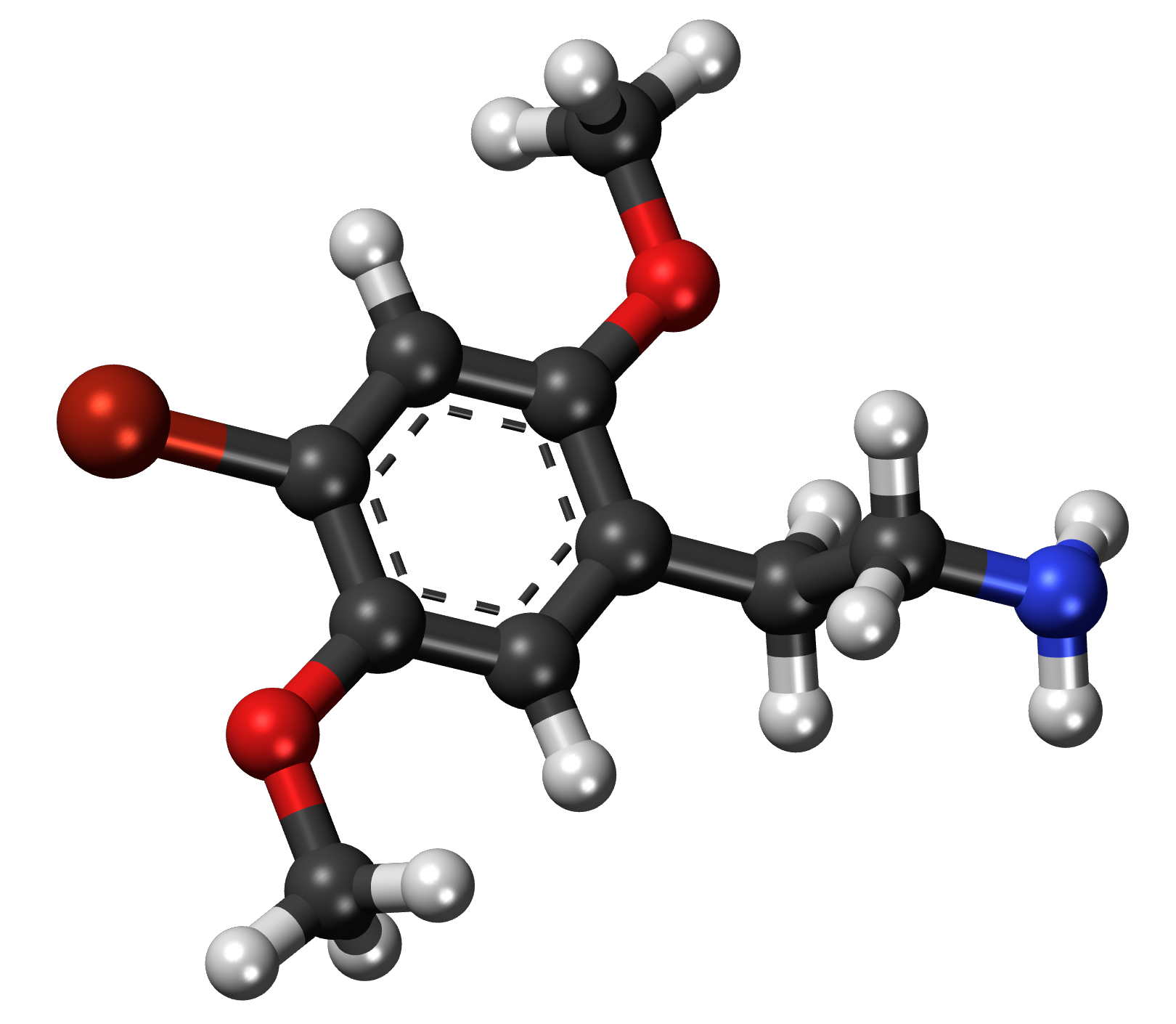
- 3D representation of a 2C-B molecule

Clinical data
- Trade names: Erox; Nexus; Perfomax
- Other names: 4-Bromo-2,5-dimethoxyphenethylamine; 2,5-Dimethoxy-4-bromophenethylamine; 2-CB; 2C-DOB; Venus; Bromo; Bees; Erox; Synergy; Toonies; Brominated phenethylamine
- Routes of administration: Oral, insufflation
- Drug class: Serotonin receptor modulator; Serotonin 5-HT_{2A} receptor agonist; Serotonergic psychedelic; Hallucinogen; stimulant; Entactogen
- ATC code: None

Legal status
- Legal status: AU: S9 (Prohibited substance); BR: Class F2 (Prohibited psychotropics); CA: Schedule III; DE: Anlage I (Authorized scientific use only); UK: Class A; US: Schedule I; UN: Psychotropic Schedule II

Pharmacokinetic data
- Bioavailability: Low
- Protein binding: Unknown
- Metabolism: Liver (MAO and CYP450)
- Metabolites: BDMPE, BDMPAA, BDMBA, and others
- Onset of action: Oral: 0.5–1.2 hours (range 0.3–1.5 hours)
- Elimination half-life: 1.2–2.5 hours
- Duration of action: Oral: 3–5 hours (range 2–8 hours)
- Excretion: Urine

Identifiers
- IUPAC name: 2-(4-Bromo-2,5-dimethoxyphenyl)ethanamine
- CAS Number: 66142-81-2
- PubChem CID: 98527
- DrugBank: DB01537
- ChemSpider: 88978
- UNII: V77772N32H
- KEGG: C22775
- ChEBI: CHEBI:189669
- ChEMBL: ChEMBL292821
- CompTox Dashboard (EPA): DTXSID10216332
- ECHA InfoCard: 100.164.088

Chemical and physical data
- Formula: C_{10}H_{14}BrNO_{2}
- Molar mass: 260.131 g·mol^{−1}
- 3D model (JSmol): Interactive image
- SMILES: COc1cc(CCN)c(OC)cc1Br
- InChI: InChI=1S/C10H14BrNO2/c1-13-9-6-8(11)10(14-2)5-7(9)3-4-12/h5-6H,3-4,12H2,1-2H3; Key:YMHOBZXQZVXHBM-UHFFFAOYSA-N

2C-B, also known as 4-bromo-2,5-dimethoxyphenethylamine or by names such as Nexus or Erox, is a psychedelic drug of the phenethylamine and 2C families. The drug is used as a recreational drug and is usually taken orally. 2C-B produces hallucinogenic, mild stimulant, and mild entactogenic-like effects. Its hallucinogenic effects at typical doses are milder than those of other psychedelics like LSD or psilocybin.

The drug acts as a potent partial agonist of the serotonin 5-HT_{2} receptors, including of the serotonin 5-HT_{2A} receptor. It produces psychedelic-like effects in animals. Numerous analogues and derivatives of 2C-B are known, such as DOB, 2C-B-FLY, and 25B-NBOMe among others.

2C-B was developed by Alexander Shulgin in 1974 and was described by him in the scientific literature in 1975. The drug emerged as a novel recreational designer drug and MDMA (ecstasy) substitute in the mid-1980s. Subsequently, it became a controlled substance in the United States in the mid-1990s. 2C-B was one of the first 2C psychedelics to be described. It is the most popular and well-known of the 2C psychedelics and is one of the most widely used designer drugs.

== Use and effects ==
In his book PiHKAL (Phenethylamines I Have Known and Loved) and other publications, Alexander Shulgin lists 2C-B's dose range as 12 to 24 mg orally and its duration as 4 to 8 hours. However, in an earlier report, he described an effective dose range of 8 to 10 mg orally and a duration of 6 to 8 hours. Threshold effects occur at a dose of 4 mg orally. A wider recreational dose range of 2 to 55 mg or more orally has been described as well, with a typical dose estimate of about 20 mg. A low dose has been said to be 5 to 15 mg, a moderate dose 10 to 25 mg, and a high or strong dose 20 to 50 mg. Most people use doses of 20 mg or lower. Shulgin and others describe 2C-B as having a steep dose–response curve, such that a small increase in dose can result in an unexpectedly large increase in effects. Over the 12 to 24 mg dose range, every 2 mg increment can result in a profound increase or change in effects. Higher doses are said to lead to more intense but not longer-lasting effects. The drug's onset is about 0.5 to 1.2 hours, with a range of 0.3 to 1.5 hours, and its time to peak effects is about 2.5 hours on average. Effects last about 3.1 to 4.9 hours on average and are shorter than those of psilocybin. In addition to oral administration, 2C-B may be insufflated less commonly, with doses being approximately one-third of those of the oral route or in the range of 10 to 30 mg and with this route producing more rapid and intense effects.

The effects of 2C-B were reported by Shulgin to include sensory enhancement, brightened colors, visual richness, mental imagery, psychedelic visuals including kaleidoscopic and organic forms, sound distortion, increased appreciation of art and music, passivity, relaxation, emotional changes, euphoria, increased body awareness, tactile enhancement, feeling like waves of energy are flowing through oneself, feeling like one's body is flooded with orgasms, and sexual enhancement. He has succinctly described 2C-B as having "a luxury of sensory enhancement (visual, sexual, gustatory) with a minimum of introspective demands". The drug was one of his favorite psychedelics and one of his "magical half-dozen" most important psychedelic phenethylamines. At doses of 8 to 10 mg, 2C-B was described as consistently producing substantial sensory enhancement, but as not "superimposing hallucinogenesis" or as having "no hallucinogenic effects", with the state being described as quite distinct from that usually associated with psychedelics. It was also said to lack the lassitude that can be associated with psilocybin.

In published reports by other authors, 2C-B has been claimed to produce effects including visual, auditory, and tactile perceptual changes, closed-eye imagery, LSD-like visuals such as colors and geometric shapes, time dilation, MDMA-like stimulant and entactogenic effects, such as being more in touch with emotions, as well as feelings of love, enhanced sociability, and empathy, feelings of peace and well-being, euphoria, a "body high", increased sensitivity to touch, touch feeling pleasurable, and being erotic. The presence of entactogenic effects with 2C-B is said to be unique among most psychedelics, along with certain other atypical psychedelics like 5-MeO-DiPT and 5-MeO-MiPT. 2C-B's effects are often described as being milder and more easily managed than other psychedelics. For example, it is said to be less incapacitating or impairing, "non-ego-threatening", not "mentally challenging" or confusing, not leading to an "extreme headspace", and leaving the mind "very clear". In addition, it is said to produce changes in thought and time perception less frequently. Due to its potential for relatively light effects, the drug has been referred to as the "Diet Coke of psychedelics" or as a "beginner psychedelic". Nonetheless, it has been described as quite visual, with the potential for all of the visuals of LSD but without the head space that LSD and psilocybin produce. However, the visuals are dose-dependent, being mild at lower doses and being more substantial and LSD-like at higher doses. 2C-B is often compared to a mixture of LSD and MDMA or a "candyflip". However, it is described as a "clear-headed candyflip", with entactogenic-like effects, LSD-like effects such as visuals, but a very clear head space. In addition, it is said to not have the same kind of forceful positive mood push that MDMA has, and to be a little more unpredictable and capable of causing bad trips or negative head spaces. 2C-B is said to be more of a "party drug", to be more recreational drug, and to have less likelihood of challenging, emotional-breakthrough, or mystical-type experiences, relative to psychedelics like psilocybin and LSD.

Formal clinical studies have found that 2C-B produces a mixture of psychedelic, some possible entactogen-like, and some stimulant effects. Specific effects in these studies have included slight hallucinogenic states, perceptual changes, ego dissolution, time dilation, increased creativity, stimulation, vigor, happiness or elation, euphoria, feelings of well-being, reduced anger, enhanced sociability and friendliness, increased reactivity to negative emotional stimuli, decreased ability to recognize expressions of happiness, augmented emotionality in speech, tenseness, confusion, and mild sympathomimetic effects such as pressor effects, among others. Findings on the entactogen-like effects of 2C-B have been mixed, with some studies reporting that it produces such effects but other studies finding no such effects similarly to psilocybin. However, in other research, both psilocybin and MDMA have been found to increase emotional empathy. Compared to psilocybin in a double-blind, placebo-controlled clinical trial, 2C-B produced fewer negative mood effects, greater positive mood effects, less intense hallucinogenic effects including overall altered consciousness, oceanic boundlessness, ego dissolution, experiential depth, and time dilation, and less cognitive impairment. Conversely, their effects in terms of visual changes and enhanced body perception were equivalent. Besides having more positively valenced mood effects than psilocybin, 2C-B produced MDMA-like positive mood effects with little in the way of negative mood effects. It was concluded that in line with anecdotal reports, 2C-B is non-ego-threatening, lacks the more serious head space of other psychedelics, and has a greater emphasis on visual and tactile changes. It was also remarked that 2C-B may be a more optimal psychedelic for people afraid of the psychedelic experience or at greater risk for negative experiences such as due to high neuroticism, with this applicable for instance in the context of psychedelic-assisted psychotherapy.

In a dose-ranging clinical study of 2C-B employing a subjective visual analogue scale (VAS), maximal "any drug effects" were 27, 56, and 72 at doses of 10, 20, and 30 mg orally, respectively. At these same respective doses, maximal "good drug effects" were 29, 60, and 68, while maximal "bad drug effects" were 2.0, 7.4, and 9.8. "Bad drug effects" were generally mild at low doses, but became more pronounced at higher doses, which is similar to the case of other psychedelics like LSD and psilocybin.

2C-B tablets often contain a dose of 5 or 10 mg of the drug. Low doses of 2C-B like 5 to 10 mg orally are said to produce stimulation, entactogen-like effects, and perceptual enhancement, while higher doses like 10 to 20 mg orally are said to produce psychedelic and hallucinogenic effects. 2C-B is frequently used at low doses as a substitute for MDMA. It is often used by people who go to electronic music festivals, also known as raves. The drug is also frequently used at clubs and parties, at home, or in nature. 2C-B is often combined with other drugs, such as MDMA, alcohol, and cannabis. Besides recreational use, 2C-B has been used in psychedelic-assisted psychotherapy at doses of 15 to 30 mg orally.

== Side effects ==
The adverse effects of 2C-B have been studied. They have been reported to include difficulty focusing gaze, trembling, sweating, nausea, abdominal pain, tachycardia, jaw clenching, difficulty breathing, coughing, diarrhea, dizziness, muscle or joint pain, tenseness, confusion, psychomotor slowing, and spatial memory impairment, among others. 2C-B produces much lower rates of fear and anxiety than other serotonergic psychedelics like psilocybin and LSD. Autonomic or sympathomimetic side effects include slightly increased heart rate and blood pressure and are lower than the increases with amphetamines and MDMA but similar to those with psilocybin. The drug produces a slight increase in cortisol levels that is also much lower than the marked increases observed with other psychedelics and MDMA. Hyperthermia has been reported at high doses. Residual side effects of 2C-B have been reported to include insomnia, flashbacks, anxiety, coughing, difficulty concentrating, and depression or sadness, among others.

Severe adverse reactions are rare, but use of 2C-B was linked to significant brain injury in one case report; the alleged "2C-B" was never actually discovered by testing so the only evidence suggesting 2C-B was the cause was the victim's own words, without taking into consideration that adulteration and impurities are very common in illicit drugs. In a later case report of unknown dose, 2C-B caused serotonin syndrome, seizures, severe brain edema, and severe and long-lasting neurological impairment. There is a case report of acquired synesthesia following a single very high dose of 2C-B. There is also a case report of persistent psychosis following a single dose of 2C-B.

=== Tolerance ===
Tolerance is said to build to the effects of 2C-B analogously to the case of other psychedelics.

=== Long-term effects ===
2C-B is a potent serotonin 5-HT_{2B} receptor agonist similarly to many other serotonergic psychedelics and hence may pose a risk of cardiac valvulopathy and other complications with frequent long-term use.

== Overdose ==
At doses over 20 or 30 mg orally, frightening hallucinations, as well as tachycardia, hypertension, and hyperthermia, may occur. The fatal dose of 2C-B in humans is unknown but its safety window is thought to be narrower than certain other psychedelics like LSD and psilocybin similarly to the case of mescaline. It was reported by Alexander Shulgin in his book PiHKAL (Phenethylamines I Have Known and Loved) that a psychologist had accidentally taken a 100 mg dose orally without apparent harm. There are three case reports of 2C-B intoxication in the scientific literature as of 2015 and no deaths have been attributed to 2C-B alone as of 2018.

== Interactions ==
2C-B is metabolized by the monoamine oxidase (MAO) enzymes MAO-A and MAO-B. Monoamine oxidase inhibitors (MAOIs) such as phenelzine, tranylcypromine, moclobemide, and selegiline may potentiate the effects of 2C-B. This may result in overdose and serious toxicity. There are anecdotal reports of strong potentiation of 2C-B by MAOIs. 2C-B may also have interactions with other medications and drugs.

== Pharmacology ==
=== Pharmacodynamics ===
2C-B activities
Target	Affinity (K_{i}, nM)
5-HT_{1A}	130–311
5-HT_{1B}	104
5-HT_{1D}	26
5-HT_{1E}	120
5-HT_{1F}	ND
5-HT_{2A}	0.66–32 (K_{i}); 1.20–689 (EC_{50}); 4–101% (E_{max})
5-HT_{2B}	13.5–97 (K_{i}); 12.6–130 (EC_{50}); 52–97% (E_{max})
5-HT_{2C}	32–90 (K_{i}); 0.03–493 (EC_{50}); 50–116% (E_{max})
5-HT_{3}	>10,000
5-HT_{4}	ND
5-HT_{5A}	>10,000
5-HT_{6}	320
5-HT_{7}	210
α_{1A}	>10,000
α_{1B}	>10,000
α_{1D}	ND
α_{2A}	309–320
α_{2B}	>10,000
α_{2C}	103
β_{1}	>10,000
β_{2}	>10,000
β_{3}	ND
D_{1}	12,000
D_{2}	2,200–25,200
D_{3}	7,116–10,000
D_{4}	>10,000
D_{5}	>10,000
H_{1}–H_{4}	>10,000
M_{1}–M_{2}	>10,000
M_{3}	822
M_{4}–M_{5}	>10,000
I_{1}	2,155
σ_{1}	>10,000
σ_{2}	>10,000
TAAR1	90–3,000 (K_{i}) (rodent); 3,300–7,190 (EC_{50}) (human)
SERT	9,700–13,300 (K_{i}); 18,000–312,900 (IC_{50})
NET	27,400–31,000 (K_{i}); 44,000–122,000 (IC_{50})
DAT	6,500–>30,000 (K_{i}); 132,000–231,000 (IC_{50})
MAO-A	125,000 (IC_{50})
MAO-B	58,000 (IC_{50})
Notes: The smaller the value, the more avidly the drug binds to the site. All proteins are human unless otherwise specified. Refs:

2C-B acts as a potent partial agonist of the serotonin 5-HT_{2} receptors, including of the serotonin 5-HT_{2A} and 5-HT_{2C} receptors and to a lesser extent of the serotonin 5-HT_{2B} receptor. In one study, it had EC_{50} (E_{max}) values of 1.2 nM (101%) at the serotonin 5-HT_{2A} receptor, 13 nM (97%) at the serotonin 5-HT_{2B} receptor, and 0.63 nM (98%) at the serotonin 5-HT_{2C} receptor. In earlier studies, 2C-B was found to be a low-efficacy serotonin 5-HT_{2A} and 5-HT_{2C} receptor partial agonist or even antagonist. However, subsequent studies have consistently found higher efficacy of 2C-B at these receptors. In addition to the serotonin 5-HT_{2} receptors, 2C-B also shows lower affinity for other serotonin receptors, such as the serotonin 5-HT_{1A} and 5-HT_{1B} receptors among others. However, while 2C-B itself was not assessed, other 2C derivatives showed little activity as serotonin 5-HT_{1A} receptor agonists (EC_{50} = >3,000 nM).

At the serotonin 5-HT_{2A} receptor, 2C-B has subsequently been identified as a biased agonist, acting as a near-full agonist of receptor in terms of Ca^{2+} mobilization (EC_{50} = 1.64 nM; E_{max} = 92.6%) but with 6-fold lower potency as a moderate-efficacy partial agonist in terms of β-arrestin2 recruitment (EC_{50} = 10.0 nM; E_{max} = 60.1%). However, serotonin itself showed about 42-fold greater potency in activating Ca^{2+} mobilization than β-arrestin2 signaling in the study. The implications of the preceding findings are not fully clear.

2C-B has been reported to be an allosteric or non-competitive serotonin transporter (SERT) inhibitor or serotonin reuptake inhibitor, albeit of very low potency. Although 2C-B itself was not evaluated, other closely related members of the 2C series, including 2C-C, 2C-D, 2C-E, 2C-I, and 2C-T-2, all showed no activity as monoamine releasing agents of serotonin, norepinephrine, or dopamine (EC_{50} = >100,000 nM or "inactive"). 2C-B shows dopaminergic actions mediated by the dopamine transporter (DAT) in monkeys but not in rodents.

2C-B produces the head-twitch response, a behavioral proxy of psychedelic effects, in rodents. It shows reinforcing effects in monkeys but not in rodents. The drug also shows potent and efficacious anti-inflammatory effects in preclinical research.

In contrast to MDMA, which robustly increases oxytocin levels and produces associated entactogenic effects, 2C-B minimally affects oxytocin levels in humans.

=== Pharmacokinetics ===
==== Absorption ====
2C-B appears to have relatively low oral bioavailability. The time to peak levels is 2.0 to 2.4 hours. Peak levels of 2C-B have been reported to be 2.5 ng/mL with 10 mg orally, 3.3 to 4.6 ng/mL with 20 mg orally, and 5.4 to 6.4 ng/mL with 30 mg orally. The peak levels of 2C-B metabolites have also been described.

==== Distribution ====
The volume of distribution and plasma protein binding of 2C-B are unknown.

==== Metabolism ====
2C-B appears to undergo substantial first-pass metabolism. It has been shown to be metabolized by liver hepatocytes, resulting in deamination and demethylation that produces several products. Oxidative deamination results in the 2-(4-bromo-2,5-dimethoxyphenyl)ethanol (BDMPE) and 4-bromo-2,5-dimethoxyphenylacetic acid (BDMPAA) metabolites. Additionally, 4-bromo-2,5-dimethoxybenzoic acid (BDMBA) can be produced by oxidative deamination. Further metabolism of BDMPE and BDMPAA may occur by demethylation. Alternatively, the later metabolites can be generated by demethylation of 2C-B followed by oxidative deamination. Deamination of 2C-B is mediated by the monoamine oxidase (MAO) enzymes MAO-A and MAO-B.

There is species differentiation in the metabolism of 2C-B. Mice hepatocytes produce 4-bromo-2,5-dimethoxyphenol (BDMP), a previously unknown metabolite. Meanwhile, human, monkey, and rabbit hepatocytes produce 2-(4-bromo-2-hydroxy-5-methoxyphenyl)-ethanol (B-2-HMPE), but dog, rat, and mouse hepatocytes do not.

2C-B's metabolites BDMPAA and 4-bromo-2-hydroxy-5-methoxyphenylacetic acid (B-2-HMPAA) in humans occur at peak concentrations 280-fold and 17-fold higher than those of 2C-B with oral administration of 2C-B, respectively.

Another known metabolite of 2C-B is 2-OH-2C-B (2-DM-2C-B; B-2-HMPEA). This compound is active and has similarly potency as a serotonin 5-HT_{2A} receptor agonist as 2C-B itself in vitro.

==== Elimination ====
The elimination half-life of 2C-B in humans is 1.2 to 2.5 hours.

== Chemistry ==
2C-B, also known as 4-bromo-2,5-dimethoxyphenethylamine, is a substituted phenethylamine of the 2C family, also known as the 4-substituted 2,5-dimethoxyphenethylamines. It is a synthetic analogue of the naturally occurring phenethylamine psychedelic mescaline found in peyote and certain other cacti.

=== Synthesis ===
The chemical synthesis of 2C-B has been described.

=== Identification ===
Exposing compounds to the reagents gives a colour change which is indicative of the compound under test.

Marquis	Mecke	Mandelin	Liebermann	Froehde	Robadope
Yellow to green	Yellow to olive brownish	green	Yellow to black	Yellow to green	Slow pink
Ehrlich	Hofmann	Simon's	Scott	Folin	
No reaction	No reaction	No reaction	No reaction	(Light) purple	

=== Analogues and derivatives ===
Analogues of 2C-B include 2C-I, 2C-C, DOB, 4C-B, 2C-B-FLY, and 25B-NBOMe, among others.

DOB and 4C-B are α-alkyl derivatives of 2C-B, specifically the amphetamine (α-methyl) and phenylisobutylamine (α-ethyl) derivatives, respectively. β-Substituted derivatives of 2C-B such as BOB (β-methoxy-2C-B), BOH-2C-B (β-hydroxy-2C-B), βk-2C-B (β-keto-2C-B), and β-methyl-2C-B (BMB) have been described. βk-2C-B shows dramatically reduced potency and efficacy as a serotonin 5-HT_{2A} receptor agonist compared to 2C-B.

A variety of N-substituted derivatives of 2C-B have been tested, including N-methyl-2C-B, N,N-dimethyl-2C-B, N-ethyl-2C-B, and N-benzyl-2C-B. Most simple alkyl derivatives were considerably less potent than 2C-B, with N-ethyl-2C-B for instance having a 40 times lower affinity for the serotonin 5-HT_{2A} receptor. The N-benzyl derivative however was found to have higher affinity than 2C-B itself, with N-(4-bromobenzyl)-2C-B binding even more tightly. This initial research did not include functional assays of activity, but later led to the development of potent substituted N-benzyl derivatives such as 25B-NBOMe, and 25B-NBOH. Another N-substituted derivative, 2C-B-AN, is an N-benzylphenethylamine-like prodrug of 2C-B.

2C-DB (6-bromo-2C-B) is a ring-substituted derivative of 2C-B. TWEETIO derivatives of 2C-B, in which one or both of the methoxy groups of 2C-B are extended to ethoxy groups, exist as well, such as 2CB-2-EtO. ASR-2001 (2CB-5PrO) is a propoxy TWEETIO and another notable analogue of 2C-B which is under development for treatment of psychiatric disorders.

FLY derivatives of 2C-B like 2C-B-FLY, 2C-B-DRAGONFLY, and 2C-B-BUTTERFLY are analogues in which the methoxy groups of 2C-B on the phenyl ring have been cyclized into furan or other rings to form benzodifuran and other tricyclic compounds.

2-OH-2C-B is the 2-O-desmethylated analogue of 2C-B and shows similar potency as a serotonin 5-HT_{2A} receptor agonist in vitro.

Cyclized phenethylamine derivatives of 2C-B in which the side chain has been cyclized in some way include DOB-CR (2C-B-CR), 2CB-Ind, 2C-B-5-hemiFLY-α6 (BNAP), 2CB7 (2C-B-5-hemiFLY-β7), TCB-2 (2CBCB), 2C-B-PYR, 2C-B-3PIP, 2C-B-3PIP-NBOMe, 2C-B-3PIP-POMe, 2CBecca, 2CJP, 2CLisaB, ZC-B, 2C-B-aminorex (2C-B-AR), and 2C-B-morpholine (2C-B-MOR), among others. Other related cyclized compounds, while not technically phenethylamines or 2C-B derivatives, include 2C-B-BZP and 2C-B-PP.

A notable positional isomer of 2C-B is the scaline and mescaline analogue 4-bromomescaline (4-Br-3,5-DMPEA).

Deuterated isotopologues of 2C-B such as 2CB-2OCD_{3} (2-trideuteromethoxy-2C-B), 2CB-5OCD_{3} (5-trideuteromethoxy-2C-B), and hexadeutero-2C-B (2,5-di(trideuteromethoxy)-2C-B) among others have been described.

Chemical structures of 2C-B analogues and derivatives
2C-B (4-bromo-2,5-DMPEA)

2C-I (4-iodo-2,5-DMPEA)

2C-C (4-chloro-2,5-DMPEA)

2C-D (4-methyl-2,5-DMPEA)

2C-E (4-ethyl-2,5-DMPEA)

DOB (α-methyl-2C-B)

DOM (α-methyl-2C-D)

4C-B (α-ethyl-2C-B)

β-Methyl-2C-B (BMB)

BOH-2C-B (BOHB; β-hydroxy-2C-B)

BOB (β-methoxy-2C-B)

βk-2C-B (β-keto-2C-B)

2C-DB (6-bromo-2C-B)

2CB-2-EtO

ASR-2001 (2CB-5PrO)

N-Methyl-2C-B (2C-B-M)

N-Ethyl-2C-B

25B-NB (N-benzyl-2C-B)

25B-NBOMe

25B-NBOH

2C-B-AN

DOB-NDEPA

2C-B-FLY

2C-B-DRAGONFLY

2C-B-BUTTERFLY

DOB-CR (2C-B-CR; DOB-THIQ)

TCB-2 (2CBCB)

2CB-Ind

2C-B-5-hemiFLY-α6 (BNAP)

2CB7 (2C-B-5-hemiFLY-β7)

ZC-B (2C-B-AZET)

2C-B-PYR

2C-B-3PIP

2C-B-3PIP-NBOMe

2C-B-3PIP-POMe

2CBecca

2CJP

2CLisaB

DMBMPP (juncosamine)

2C-B-aminorex (2C-B-AR)

2C-B-morpholine (2C-B-MOR)

2C-B-BZP

2C-B-PP

2-OH-2C-B (2-DM-2C-B)

4-Bromomescaline (4-Br-3,5-DMPEA)

Mescaline (3,4,5-TMPEA)

2CB-2OCD_{3} (2-trideuteromethoxy-2C-B)

2CB-5OCD_{3} (5-trideuteromethoxy-2C-B)

Hexadeutero-2C-B (2,5-di(trideuteromethoxy)-2C-B)

== History ==
2C-B was first synthesized and evaluated by American chemist Alexander Shulgin in 1974. He described the properties and effects of 2C-B in humans, along with those of 2C-D, in the scientific literature in 1975. Shulgin proposed 2C-B and 2C-D for use in psychedelic-assisted psychotherapy. However, it was reportedly abandoned for such purposes due to gastrointestinal side effects and lack of entactogenic effects. 2C-B was Shulgin's favorite psychedelic of his own creations, though he has said that he only tried it a few times.

Erox (2C-B) by Drittewelle packaging.

2C-B was legitimately marketed and sold as an over-the-counter sexual enhancer under brand names like Erox in several European countries such as Germany in the 1980s and early 1990s. It was manufactured by the German pharmaceutical company Drittewelle and was sold in adult stores, smart shops, and some nightclubs. In addition, 2C-B was sold in Dutch smart shops as an ecstasy-like legal high under names like Nexus. 2C-B was first encountered as a novel recreational designer drug in the United States in 1985. It was advertised and used as an MDMA substitute after MDMA was made illegal around this time.

2C-B has been said to have been legally sold in Southern Africa from 1993 to 1996 and used as an entheogen by the Sangoma, Nyanga, and Amagqirha people in place of their traditional plants; they refer to the chemical as Ubulawu Nomathotholo, which roughly translates to "Medicine of the Singing Ancestors".

The drug became a controlled substance in the United States in 1994. It also became a controlled substance in most other countries in the mid-1990s. In addition, 2C-B was placed in Schedule II of the United Nations Convention on Psychotropic Substances and hence became an internationally controlled substance in 2001.

Following 2C-B's restriction, many other 2C psychedelics, such as 2C-E and 2C-I, emerged as designer drugs. Nonetheless, 2C-B is the most popular of the 2C psychedelics. Subsequent to their emergence, numerous other 2C drugs besides 2C-B have also been made controlled substances throughout the world. In addition to other 2Cs, derivatives of 2C-B such as 2C-B-FLY and 25B-NBOMe have been developed and emerged as well-known novel designer drugs. 2C-B-FLY was Ann Shulgin's favorite psychedelic, which she especially enjoyed in terms of enhanced eroticism, and preferred "a bit more" than 2C-B.

== Society and culture ==
=== Names ===
Brand names and street names of 2C-B include Nexus, Venus, Bromo, Erox, Perfomax, Bees, Toonies, Spectrum, XTC, and Synergy, among others.

=== Illicit forms ===
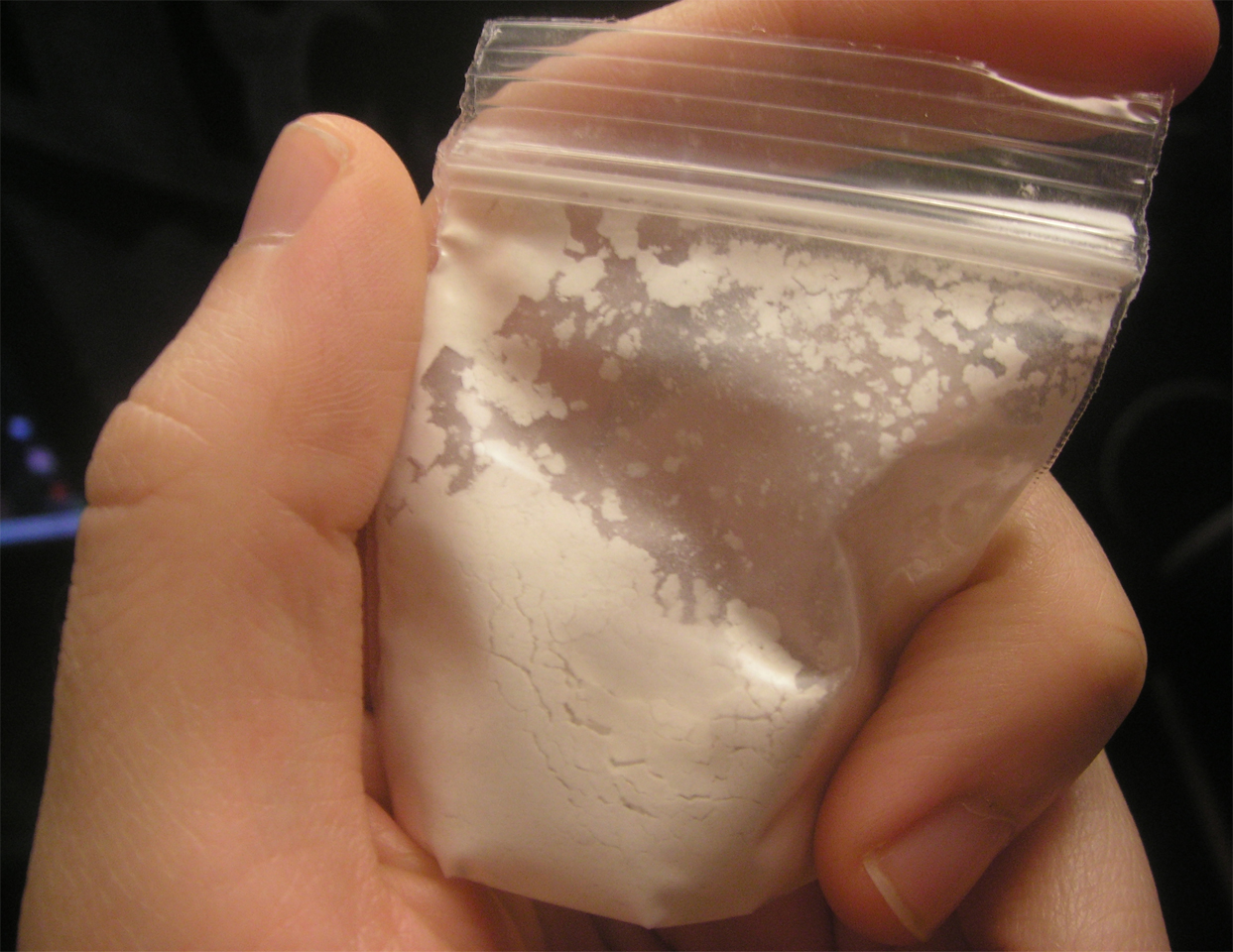
A gram of 2C-B powder.

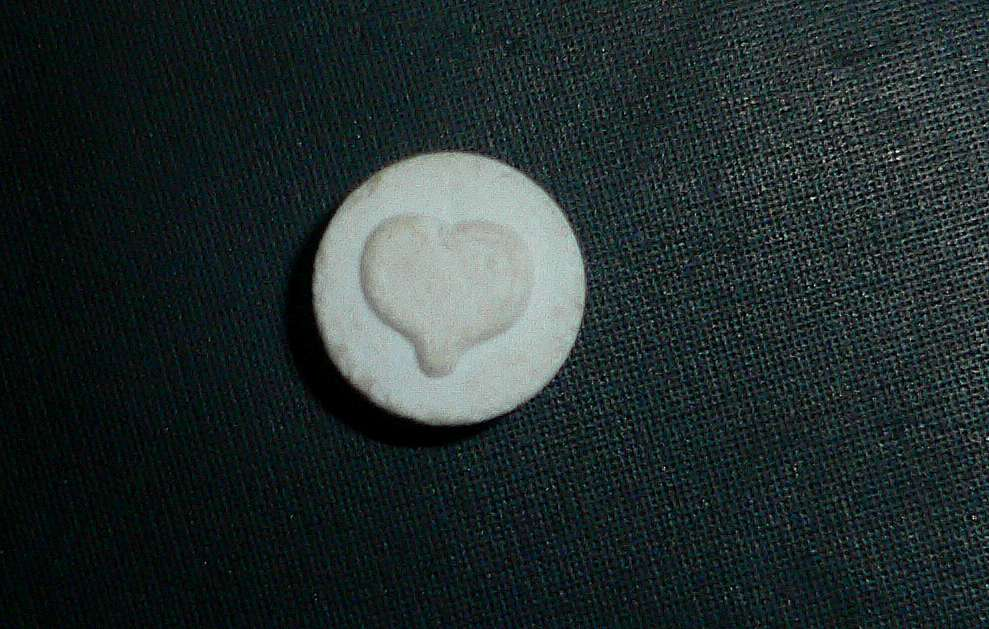
A 2C-B pill with heart logo.

Street purity of 2C-B, when tested, has been found to be relatively high. Researchers in Spain found that 2C-B samples in the country doubled between 2006 and 2009, switched from primarily powder form to tablets, and exhibited "low falsification rates". An analysis of street samples in the Netherlands found impurities "in small percentages"; only one of the impurities, the N-acetyl derivative of 2C-B, could be identified, and comprised 1.3% of the sample. The authors suggested that this compound was a by-product of 2C-B synthesis.

In 2011, street prices in the United States ranged between $10 and $30 per tablet when purchased in small quantities. Larger retail purchases cost between $200 and $500 per gram. Wholesale purchases of 2C-B would lower the price ($100 to $300 per gram in 2001, $30 to $100 on the darknet in 2020).

=== Popular culture ===
- Kanye West has mentioned 2C-B in his 2018 song Yikes with the line "“Tweakin’, tweakin’ off that 2C-B".

=== Legal status ===
==== United nations ====
The UN Commission on Narcotic Drugs added 2C-B to Schedule II of the Convention on Psychotropic Substances in March 2001.

2C-B is a scheduled drug in most jurisdictions. The following is a partial list of territories where the substance has been scheduled.

==== Argentina ====
2C-B is controlled under the List 1, as well as similar substances like 2C-I or 2C-T-2.

==== Australia ====
2C-B is controlled in Australia and on the list of substances subject to import and export controls (Appendix B). It was placed on Schedule One of the Drugs Misuse and Trafficking Act when it first came to notice in 1994, when in a showcase legal battle chemist R. Simpson was charged with manufacturing the substance in Sydney. Alexander Shulgin came to Australia to testify on behalf of the defense, to no avail.

2C-B is not specifically listed in the Australia Poisons Standard (October 2015), however similar drugs such as 2C-T-2 and 2C-I are making 2C-B fall under the Australian analogue act.

==== Belgium ====
In Belgium, 2C-B is a controlled substance making production, distribution, and possession illegal.

==== Brazil ====
In Brazil, 2C-B is a controlled substance making production, distribution, and possession illegal.

==== Canada ====
In Canada, 2C-B is classified under Controlled Drugs and Substances Act as Schedule III as "4-bromo-2,5-dimethoxybenzeneethanamine and any salt, isomer or salt of isomer thereof".

2C-B has been rescheduled (Schedule III), in a new amendment, taking effect on October 31, 2016. This is to include the other 2C-x analogues.

==== Chile ====
In August 2007, 2C-B, along with many other psychologically active substances, was added to Ley 20.000, known as the Ley de drogas.

==== Czech Republic ====
Possession of more than 200 mg of 2C-B is punishable with a two years jail sentence. Smaller amount is punishable by a fine. The 200 mg threshold is merely a guideline which the court can reconsider depending on circumstances.

==== Denmark ====
In Denmark, 2C-B is listed as a category B drug.

==== Estonia ====
In Estonia, 2C-B is classified as Schedule I.

==== Finland ====
Scheduled in the "government decree on substances, preparations and plants considered to be narcotic drugs".

==== Germany ====
In Germany, 2C-B is controlled in the Betäubungsmittelgesetz (BtMG) Anlage I as "Bromdimethoxyphenethylamin" (BDMPEA).

==== Italy ====
2C-B is schedule I (tabella I).

==== Japan ====
In Japan, 2C-B was scheduled in 1998. It was previously marketed as "Performax".

==== Luxembourg ====
In Luxembourg, 2C-B is a prohibited substance since 2001.

==== Netherlands ====
In the Netherlands, 2C-B was scheduled on July 9, 1997.

In the Netherlands, 2C-B became a list I substance of the Opium Law despite no health incidents occurring. Following the ban, other phenethylamines were sold in place of 2C-B until the Netherlands became the first country in the world to ban 2C-I, 2C-T-2 and 2C-T-7 alongside 2C-B.

==== Norway ====
In Norway, 2C-B was classified as Schedule II on March 22, 2004, listed as 4-bromo-2,5-dimethoxyphenethylamine.

==== Poland ====
2C-B is schedule I (I-P group) in Poland.

==== Russia ====
Banned as a narcotic drug with a criminal penalty for possession of at least 10 mg.

==== Spain ====
In Spain, 2C-B was added to Category 2 prohibited substances in 2002.

==== Sweden ====
2C-B is currently classified as Schedule I in Sweden.

2C-B was first classified as "health hazard" under the act Lagen om förbud mot vissa hälsofarliga varor (Act on the Prohibition of Certain Goods Dangerous to Health) as of April 1, 1999, under SFS 1999:58 that made it illegal to sell or possess. Then it became schedule I as of June 1, 2002, published in LVFS 2002:4 but mislabeled "2-CB" in the document. However, this was corrected in a new document, LVFS 2009:22 effective December 9, 2009.

==== Switzerland ====
In Switzerland, 2C-B is listed in Anhang D of the DetMV and is illegal to possess.

==== United Kingdom ====
All drugs in the 2C family are Class A under the Misuse of Drugs Act which means they are illegal to produce, supply or possess. Possession carries a maximum sentence of seven years imprisonment while supply is punishable by life imprisonment and an unlimited fine.

==== United States ====
In the United States, 2C-B is classified as a Schedule I controlled substance. This became permanent law on June 2, 1995, following a proposal by the Drug Enforcement Administration in December 1994.

== Research ==
2C-B has been studied and suggested for more widespread use in psychedelic-assisted psychotherapy.

== See also ==
- 2C (psychedelics)
- Stimulant § Serotonin 5-HT_{2A} receptor agonists
