= 2,5-Dimethoxy-3-bromoamphetamine =

3-DOB

Clinical data
- Other names: 3-Br-2,5-DMA; 3-DOB; iso-DOB; SL-7161; 2,5-Dimethoxy-3-bromoamphetamine; 3-Bromo-2,5-dimethoxyamphetamine
- Drug class: Psychoactive drug; Serotonin receptor modulator
- ATC code: None

Legal status
- Legal status: None

Identifiers
- CAS Number: 106791-38-2
- PubChem CID: 12626552
- ChemSpider: 23115301
- ChEMBL: ChEMBL16883

Chemical and physical data
- Formula: C_{11}H_{16}BrNO_{2}
- Molar mass: 274.158 g·mol^{−1}
- 3D model (JSmol): Interactive image
- SMILES: COc1cc(CC(N)C)c(c(c1)Br)OC
- InChI: InChI=InChI=1S/C11H16BrNO2/c1-7(13)4-8-5-9(14-2)6-10(12)11(8)15-3/h5-7H,4,13H2,1-3H3; Key:HCZXNFSMGJKVHO-UHFFFAOYSA-N

2,5-Dimethoxy-3-bromoamphetamine, also known as 3-Br-2,5-DMA, 3-DOB, or iso-DOB, is a psychoactive compound belonging to the family of substituted phenеthylamines and amphetamine derivatives. It is a positional isomer of 4-bromo-2,5-dimethoxyamphetamine (DOB; 4-Br-2,5-DMA) and a derivative of 2,5-dimethoxyamphetamine (2,5-DMA; DOH) where the hydrogen atom in the 3 position of the benzene ring is replaced by bromine. 3-Br-2,5-DMA exhibits agonistic activity against serotonin 5-HT_{2} and 5-HT_{3} receptors. In The Shulgin Index, 3-Br-2,5-DMA was referred to as "3-DOB"

== Pharmacology ==
=== Pharmacodynamics ===
3-Br-2,5-DMA demonstrated weak or even low psychoactivity, unlike its isomers, and did not have a significant effect on the activity of neurons in the locus coeruleus. Despite the structural difference, it is precisely because of the positional difference from other isomers that this substance exhibits a low psychoactive effect, 3-Br-2,5-DMA It did not cause any behavioral changes or hallucinogenic effects, it is noted that this substance is of "inactive". 3-Br-2,5-DMA binds to serotonin receptors approximately 50 to 60 times weaker than DOB.

== Chemistry ==
=== Synthesis ===
3-Br-2,5-DMA can be successfully obtained from nitropropene. Synthesis of the 3-Br-2,5-DMA requires the use of aluminum hydride (AlH_{3}) instead of the standard lithium aluminum hydride, since the latter causes a dehalogenation side reaction leading to the elimination of a bromine atom.

== History ==
3-DOB was first described in the scientific literature by Richard Glennon and colleagues by 1980.

== See also ==
- Substituted methoxyphenethylamine
- DOx § Related compounds
