= 25B-NBOMe =

Chemical compound

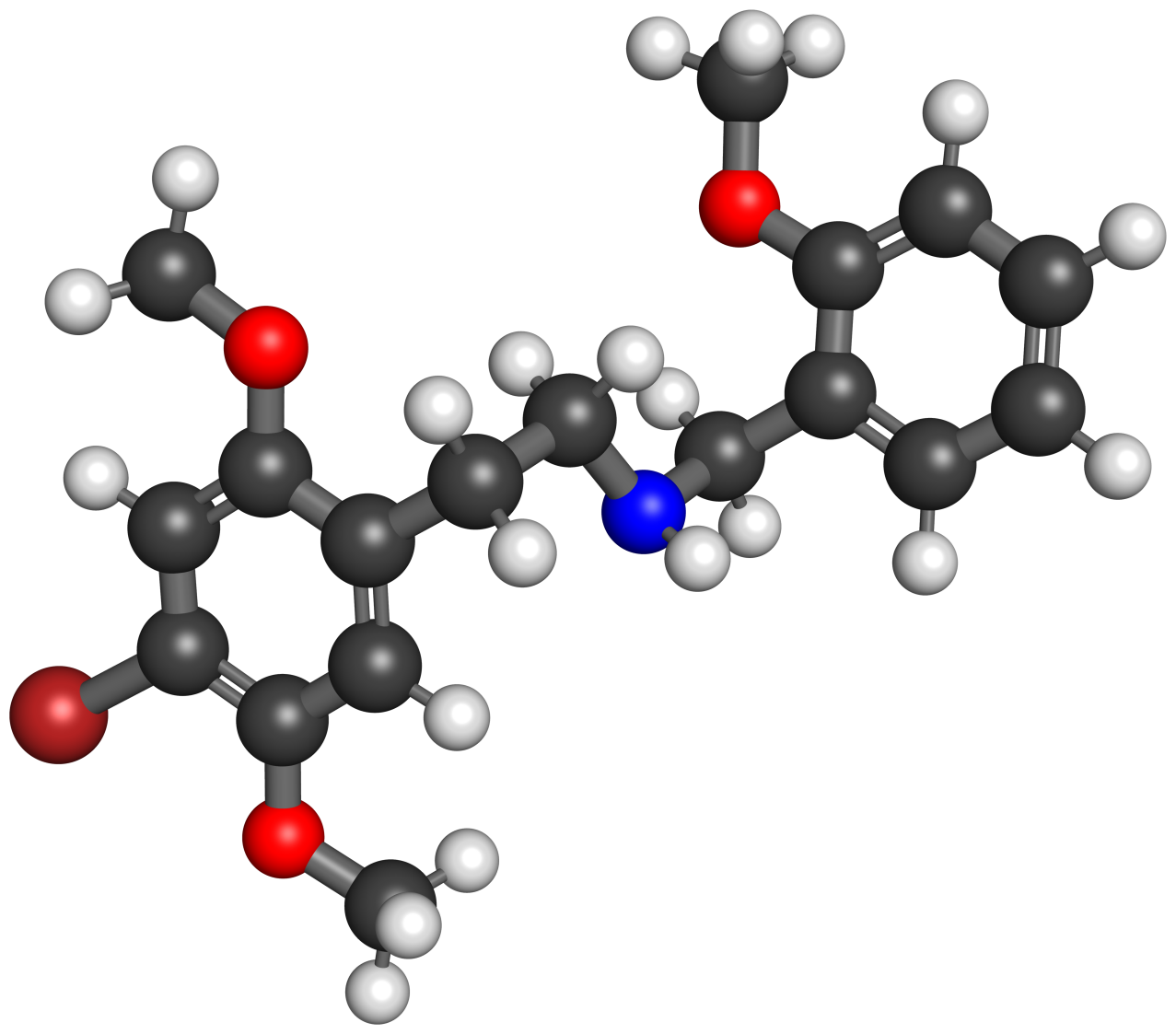

Clinical data
- Other names: NBOMe-2C-B; Cimbi-36; Nova; BOM 2-CB; N-(2-Methoxybenzyl)-4-bromo-2,5-dimethoxyphenethylamine
- Routes of administration: Sublingual, buccal, intranasal
- Drug class: Serotonin 5-HT_{2} receptor agonist; Serotonin 5-HT_{2A} receptor agonist; Serotonergic psychedelic; Hallucinogen
- ATC code: None

Legal status
- Legal status: BR: Class F2 (Prohibited psychotropics); DE: Anlage I (Authorized scientific use only); UK: Class A; US: Schedule I; UN: Psychotropic Schedule I

Pharmacokinetic data
- Metabolites: 5-DM-25B-NBOMe
- Onset of action: 45–75 minutes or 15–120 minutes
- Duration of action: 8–12 hours

Identifiers
- IUPAC name: 2-(4-bromo-2,5-dimethoxyphenyl)-N-[(2-methoxyphenyl)methyl]ethanamine
- CAS Number: 1026511-90-9
- PubChem CID: 9977044
- ChemSpider: 8152636
- UNII: S6NAA81PHK
- KEGG: C22773
- CompTox Dashboard (EPA): DTXSID50907974

Chemical and physical data
- Formula: C_{18}H_{22}BrNO_{3}
- Molar mass: 380.282 g·mol^{−1}
- 3D model (JSmol): Interactive image
- SMILES: COC1=CC=CC=C1CNCCC2=CC(=C(C=C2OC)Br)OC
- InChI: InChI=1S/C18H22BrNO3/c1-21-16-7-5-4-6-14(16)12-20-9-8-13-10-18(23-3)15(19)11-17(13)22-2/h4-7,10-11,20H,8-9,12H2,1-3H3; Key:SUXGNJVVBGJEFB-UHFFFAOYSA-N

25B-NBOMe, also known as NBOMe-2C-B, Cimbi-36, or as N-(2-methoxybenzyl)-4-bromo-2,5-dimethoxyphenethylamine, is a psychedelic drug of the phenethylamine, 2C, and 25-NB (NBOMe) families. It is the N-(2-methoxybenzyl) derivative of 2C-B. The drug is taken sublingually, buccally, or intranasally.

It acts as a potent full agonist for the serotonin 5-HT_{2A} receptor.

25B-NBOMe was first described in the scientific literature by Ralf Heim and colleagues at the Free University of Berlin by 1999. After 25I-NBOMe and along with 25C-NBOMe, 25B-NBOMe is one of the most widely used 25-NB psychedelics.

== Use and effects ==
The dose range of 25B-NBOMe has been given as 50 to 700 μg or more sublingually, with a typical dose estimate of 400 μg. Doses over 800 μg are said to be very strong. It may also be taken buccally or intranasally. The intranasal dose range has been give as 50 to 500 μg or more and is slightly lower than the sublingual dose range. 25-NB drugs like 25B-NBOMe are not orally active. 25B-NBOMe's onset sublingually is said to be 45 to 75 minutes or 15 to 120 minutes and to be longer than that of LSD. The drug's duration is 8 to 12 hours.

== Toxicity and harm potential ==
NBOMe compounds are often associated with life-threatening toxicity and death. Studies on NBOMe family of compounds demonstrated that the substances exhibit neurotoxic and cardiotoxic activity. Reports of autonomic dysfunction remains prevalent with NBOMe compounds, with most individuals experiencing sympathomimetic toxicity such as vasoconstriction, hypertension and tachycardia in addition to hallucinations. Other symptoms of toxidrome include agitation or aggression, seizure, hyperthermia, diaphoresis, hypertonia, rhabdomyolysis, and death. Researchers report that NBOMe intoxication frequently display signs of serotonin syndrome. The likelihood of seizure is higher in NBOMes compared to other psychedelics.

NBOMe and NBOHs are regularly sold as LSD in blotter papers, which have a bitter taste and different safety profiles. Despite high potency, recreational doses of LSD have only produced low incidents of acute toxicity. Fatalities involved in NBOMe intoxication suggest that a significant number of individuals ingested the substance which they believed was LSD, and researchers report that "users familiar with LSD may have a false sense of security when ingesting NBOMe inadvertently". While most fatalities are due to the physical effects of the drug, there have also been reports of death due to self-harm and suicide under the influence of the substance.

Given limited documentation of NBOMe consumption, the long-term effects of the substance remain unknown. NBOMe compounds are not active orally, (Note: The potency of N-benzylphenethylamines via buccal, sublingual, or nasal absorption is 50- to 100-fold greater (by weight) than oral route compared to the parent 2C-x compounds. Researchers hypothesize the low oral metabolic stability of N-benzylphenethylamines is likely causing the low bioavailability on the oral route, although the metabolic profile of this compounds remains unpredictable; therefore researchers state that the fatalities linked to these substances may partly be explained by differences in the metabolism between individuals.) and are usually taken sublingually. When NBOMes are administered sublingually, numbness of the tongue and mouth followed by a metallic chemical taste was observed, and researchers describe this physical side effect as one of the main discriminants between NBOMe compounds and LSD.

=== Neurotoxic and cardiotoxic actions ===
Many of the NBOMe compounds have high potency agonist activity at additional 5-HT receptors and prolonged activation of 5-HT_{2B} can cause cardiac valvulopathy in high doses and chronic use. 5-HT_{2B} receptors have been strongly implicated in causing drug-induced valvular heart disease. The high affinity of NBOMe compounds for adrenergic α_{1} receptor has been reported to contribute to the stimulant-type cardiovascular effects.

In vitro studies, 25C-NBOMe has been shown to exhibit cytotoxicity on neuronal cell lines SH-SY5Y, PC12, and SN471, and the compound was more potent than methamphetamine at reducing the visibility of the respective cells; the neurotoxicity of the compound involves activation of MAPK/ERK cascade and inhibition of Akt/PKB signaling pathway. 25C-NBOMe, including the other derivative 25D-NBOMe, reduced the visibility of cardiomyocytes H9c2 cells, and both substances downregulated expression level of p21 (CDC24/RAC)-activated kinase 1 (PAK1), an enzyme with documented cardiac protective effects.

Preliminary studies on 25C-NBOMe have shown that the substance is toxic to development, heart health, and brain health in zebrafish, rats, and Artemia salina, a common organism for studying potential drug effects on humans, but more research is needed on the topic, the doses, and if the toxicology results apply to humans. Researchers of the study also recommended further investigation of the drug's potential in damaging pregnant women and their fetus due to the substance's damaging effects to development.

=== Emergency treatment ===
At present, there are no specific antidotes for NBOMes, and all acute intoxication is managed by symptomatic treatments, such as administration of benzodiazepines, antipsychotic drugs, and antiarrhythmic agents, such as beta blockers; some emergency interventions are intended to specifically treat rhabdomyolysis, which may lead to critical complications such as metabolic acidosis and acute kidney injury.

== Pharmacology ==
=== Pharmacodynamics ===
25B-NBOMe activities
Target	Affinity (K_{i}, nM)
5-HT_{1A}	1,255–3,600
5-HT_{1B}	>10,000
5-HT_{1D}	1,472
5-HT_{1E}	>10,000
5-HT_{1F}	ND
5-HT_{2A}	0.19–0.8 (K_{i}); 0.12–40 (EC_{50}); 28–167% (E_{max})
5-HT_{2B}	0.5 (K_{i}); 7.3–10 (EC_{50}); 19–79% (E_{max})
5-HT_{2C}	1.7–6.2 (K_{i}); 0.90–12 (EC_{50}); 93–110% (E_{max})
5-HT_{3}	>10,000
5-HT_{4}	ND
5-HT_{5A}	4,087
5-HT_{6}	48
5-HT_{7}	4,720
α_{1A}	430–1,256
α_{1B}	6,180
α_{1D}	2,253
α_{2A}	430–3,551
α_{2B}	1,264
α_{2C}	646
β_{1}	6,719
β_{2}	>10,000
β_{3}	ND
D_{1}	9,300–>10,000
D_{2}	840–>10,000
D_{3}	718–2,700
D_{4}	2,253
D_{5}	>10,000
H_{1}	80
H_{2}	ND
H_{3}	>10,000
H_{4}	ND
M_{1}–M_{4}	>10,000
M_{5}	5,241
I_{1}	ND
σ_{1}	310
σ_{2}	64
MOR	>10,000 (K_{i}); 4,730–>22,000 (EC_{50}); 8–94% (E_{max})
DOR	ND
KOR	642
TAAR1	4,500 (K_{i}) (mouse); 280 (K_{i}) (rat); 6,100 (EC_{50}) (mouse); 1,200 (EC_{50}) (rat) >10,000 (EC_{50}) (human); 47% (E_{max}) (mouse); 37% (E_{max}) (rat)
SERT	388–840 (K_{i}); 4,900–7,100 (IC_{50}); ND (EC_{50})
NET	1,100–1,718 (K_{i}); 6,700–11,000 (IC_{50}); ND (EC_{50})
DAT	7,200–>10,000 (K_{i}); 99,000–117,000 (IC_{50}); ND (EC_{50})
Notes: The smaller the value, the more avidly the drug binds to the site. All proteins are human unless otherwise specified. Refs:

25B-NBOMe is a selective serotonin 5-HT_{2} receptor agonist. It showed roughly the same affinity for the serotonin 5-HT_{2A}, 5-HT_{2B}, and 5-HT_{2C} receptors in one study (K_{i} = 0.5–1.7 nM). However, in another study, it showed 12- to 20-fold selectivity for the serotonin 5-HT_{2A} receptor (K_{i} = 0.5 nM) over the serotonin 5-HT_{2B} and 5-HT_{2C} receptors (K_{i} = 10 and 6.2 nM, respectively). The drug is highly selective for the serotonin 5-HT_{2} receptors over a variety of other serotonin receptors, as well as over various other monoamine receptors and over the monoamine transporters (>200-fold selectivity). However, 25B-NBOMe is a low-potency partial agonist of the rat and mouse trace amine-associated receptor 1 (TAAR1) but is inactive at the human TAAR1.

25B-NBOMe has been found to increase levels of glutamate, serotonin, dopamine, and acetylcholine in the frontal cortex, striatum, and nucleus accumbens in rats. Other serotonergic psychedelics like LSD and DOI have also been found to increase glutamate levels in the frontal cortex in rodents, and this effect can be blocked by the serotonin 5-HT_{2A} receptor antagonist volinanserin (MDL-100,907). 25B-NBOMe shows an inverted U-shaped dose–response curve in terms of neurotransmitter elevations in multiple brain areas. This may be due to an inhibitory effect of serotonin 5-HT_{2C} receptors at higher doses. 25B-NBOMe produces the head-twitch response, a behavioral proxy of psychedelic effects, in rodents, and this effect shows an inverted U-shaped dose–response curve similarly to its influences on neurotransmitter levels. The head twitches and hallucinogenic effects of 25B-NBOMe may be due to increased cortical glutamate release secondary to serotonin 5-HT_{2A} receptor activation. The effects of 25B-NBOMe on levels of other neurotransmitters, such as accumbal dopamine concentrations, may also be mediated by activation of serotonin 5-HT_{2A} receptors and glutamate elevation. It has been suggested that the serotonin elevations with 25B-NBOMe may be involved in its production of serotonin syndrome in humans.

Unlike many other serotonergic psychedelics, 25B-NBOMe has been found to produce reinforcing effects in rodents, including conditioned place preference (CPP) and self-administration, and hence may have misuse potential. Accordingly, 25B-NBOMe robustly increased dopamine levels in the nucleus accumbens in rodents similarly to but a lesser extent than methamphetamine, and its reinforcing effects could be blocked by the dopamine receptor antagonists SCH-23390 and haloperidol. Serotonin 5-HT_{2A} receptor activation is known to increase dopamine release in the mesolimbic pathway. However, the reinforcing effects of 25B-NBOMe were not blocked by the selective serotonin 5-HT_{2A} receptor antagonist ketanserin. Similarly to 25B-NBOMe, 25N-NBOMe has also shown reinforcing effects in rodents. More research is needed to elucidate how 25B-NBOMe and other NBOMe drugs produce reinforcing effects in animals.

25B-NBOMe has been found to decrease locomotor activity in rodents.

25B-NBOMe has been found to produce neurotoxicity in rodents.

== Chemistry ==
=== Analogues ===
Analogues of 25B-NBOMe include 2C-B, DOB, 25B-NB, DOB-NBOMe, 25I-NBOMe, 25C-NBOMe, 25B-NBOH, 25B-NBF, 2CBFly-NBOMe, 2CBCB-NBOMe (NBOMe-TCB-2), DMBMPP, and 25B-NAcPip, among others.

Analogues of 25B-NBOMe with the methoxy group at the 5 position of the core phenyl ring replaced, such as 5-DM-25B-NBOMe (5-O-desmethyl-25B-NBOMe), have been studied and found to be active.

The carbon-11 labeled version of this compound ([^{11}C]Cimbi-36) was synthesized and validated as a radioactive tracer for positron emission tomography (PET) in Copenhagen. As a 5-HT_{2A} receptor agonist PET radioligand, [^{11}C]Cimbi-36 was hypothesized to provide a more functional marker of these receptors. Also, [^{11}C]Cimbi-36 is investigated as a potential marker of serotonin release and thus could serve as an indicator of serotonin levels in vivo. [^{11}C]Cimbi-36 is now undergoing clinical trials as a PET-ligand in humans.

== History ==
25B-NBOMe was first described in the scientific literature, in the form of conference abstracts, by Ralf Heim and colleagues at the Free University of Berlin by 1999.

== Society and culture ==
=== Legal status ===
==== Canada ====
As of October 31, 2016; 25B-NBOMe is a controlled substance (Schedule III) in Canada.

==== China ====
As of October 2015 25B-NBOMe is a controlled substance in China.

==== Czech Republic ====
25B-NBOMe is banned in the Czech Republic.

==== Finland ====
Scheduled in the "government decree on substances, preparations and plants considered to be narcotic drugs".

==== Russia ====
Banned as a narcotic drug since May 5, 2015.

==== Sweden ====
In Sweden, the Riksdag added 25B-NBOMe to schedule I ("substances, plant materials and fungi which normally do not have medical use") as narcotics in Sweden as of August 1, 2013, published by the Medical Products Agency in their regulation LVFS 2013:15 listed as 25B-NBOMe 2-(4-bromo-2,5-dimetoxifenyl)-N-(2-metoxibensyl)etanamin.

==== United Kingdom ====
This substance is a Class A drug in the United Kingdom as a result of the N-benzylphenethylamine catch-all clause in the Misuse of Drugs Act 1971.

==== United States ====
In November 2013, the U.S. Drug Enforcement Administration placed 25B-NBOMe (along with 25I-NBOMe and 25C-NBOMe) in Schedule I of the Controlled Substances Act, making it illegal to manufacture, buy, possess, process, or distribute.

== See also ==
- 25-NB (psychedelics)
