= ZC-B =

Chemical compound

Clinical data
- Other names: 3-(4-Bromo-2,5-dimethoxyphenyl)azetidine; 2C-B-AZET; 2C-B-Azet

Identifiers
- IUPAC name: 3-(4-bromo-2,5-dimethoxyphenyl)azetidine
- CAS Number: 2641630-65-9
- PubChem CID: 156337249
- UNII: 9EP4MV3URL

Chemical and physical data
- Formula: C_{11}H_{14}BrNO_{2}
- Molar mass: 272.142 g·mol^{−1}
- 3D model (JSmol): Interactive image
- SMILES: COC1=CC(=C(C=C1C2CNC2)OC)Br
- InChI: InChI=1S/C11H14BrNO2/c1-14-10-4-9(12)11(15-2)3-8(10)7-5-13-6-7/h3-4,7,13H,5-6H2,1-2H3; Key:YFCASESLVDHSAW-UHFFFAOYSA-N

ZC-B, also known as 3-(4-bromo-2,5-dimethoxyphenyl)azetidine or as 2C-B-AZET, is a phenethylamine derivative which acts as a serotonin receptor agonist selective for the 5-HT_{2} subtypes, with an EC_{50} of 1.6 nM at 5-HT_{2A}, vs 5.8 nM at 5-HT_{2C}. It is structurally related to the psychedelic phenethylamines 2C-B and DOB, but with the amine side chain conformationally restricted as an azetidine ring.

== See also ==
- Cyclized phenethylamine
- DOB
- β-Methyl-2C-B
- 2C-B-PYR
- 2C-B-3PIP
- 4C-B
- TCB-2
- LPH-5
- LSZ
