= 2C-B-morpholine =

Clinical data
- Other names: 2C-B-Norphenmetrazine; 2-(4-Bromo-2,5-dimethoxyphenyl)morpholine; 2C-B-MOR; 2C-B-Mor
- Drug class: Serotonin receptor modulator; Serotonin 5-HT_{2A} receptor ligand
- ATC code: None

Legal status
- Legal status: In general Unscheduled.

Identifiers
- IUPAC name: 2-(4-bromo-2,5-dimethoxyphenyl)morpholine
- CAS Number: 807631-07-8
- PubChem CID: 11429275
- ChemSpider: 9604151
- ChEMBL: ChEMBL191154

Chemical and physical data
- Formula: C_{12}H_{16}BrNO_{3}
- Molar mass: 302.168 g·mol^{−1}
- 3D model (JSmol): Interactive image
- SMILES: COC1=CC(=C(C=C1C2CNCCO2)OC)Br
- InChI: InChI=1S/C12H16BrNO3/c1-15-10-6-9(13)11(16-2)5-8(10)12-7-14-3-4-17-12/h5-6,12,14H,3-4,7H2,1-2H3; Key:OUTZYBJUJMETRJ-UHFFFAOYSA-N

2C-B-morpholine, also known as 2C-B-norphenmetrazine or as 2-(4-bromo-2,5-dimethoxyphenyl)morpholine, is a serotonin receptor modulator of the phenylmorpholine (phenmetrazine) and cyclized phenethylamine groups. It is a ligand of the serotonin 5-HT_{2A} receptor, with an affinity of 20.6 nM and an E_{max} of 4%. The drug showed 103-fold lower affinity for this receptor than R(–)-DOB and had minimal agonist activity (with R(–)-DOB having an E_{max} of 51% in the assay), so for practical purposes would act as an antagonist at the 5-HT_{2A} receptor under most circumstances, despite being technically classified as a partial agonist. 2C-B-morpholine was first described in the scientific literature by Richard Glennon and colleagues by 2004.

== See also ==
- Substituted phenethylamine § Cyclized phenethylamines
- Substituted phenylmorpholine
- LPH-5
- 2C-B-aminorex
- 2C-B-3PIP
- 2C-B-PP
- 2C-B-BZP
