= 2C-B-PYR =

Clinical data
- Other names: 2C-B-Pyr; β,N-Dimethylene-2C-B; 3-(4-Bromo-2,5-dimethoxyphenyl)pyrrolidine
- Drug class: Serotonin 5-HT_{2A} and 5-HT_{2C} receptor agonist
- ATC code: None

Identifiers
- IUPAC name: 3-(4-bromo-2,5-dimethoxyphenyl)pyrrolidine
- CAS Number: 1268110-42-4
- PubChem CID: 82134857
- ChemSpider: 25744145

Chemical and physical data
- Formula: C_{12}H_{16}BrNO_{2}
- Molar mass: 286.169 g·mol^{−1}
- 3D model (JSmol): Interactive image
- SMILES: COC1=CC(=C(C=C1C2CCNC2)OC)Br
- InChI: InChI=1S/C12H16BrNO2/c1-15-11-6-10(13)12(16-2)5-9(11)8-3-4-14-7-8/h5-6,8,14H,3-4,7H2,1-2H3; Key:BSXIERMNSJEFOE-UHFFFAOYSA-N

2C-B-PYR, also known as 3-(4-bromo-2,5-dimethoxyphenyl)pyrrolidine, is a serotonin receptor modulator of the phenethylamine family. It is a cyclized phenethylamine, more specifically a cyclized pyrrolidine derivative of the psychedelic drug 2C-B, and is closely related to ZC-B (azetidine) and 2C-B-3PIP (piperidine). The drug acts as a potent and efficacious agonist of the serotonin 5-HT_{2A} and 5-HT_{2C} receptors. It was patented by Lophora in 2021 and was first described in the scientific literature in 2024.

== See also ==
- Substituted methoxyphenethylamine
- Cyclized phenethylamine
- 2C-B-morpholine
- 2C-B-3PIP
- APA-01
- Clausenamide
- LPH-5
- ZC-B
