= 2C-I =

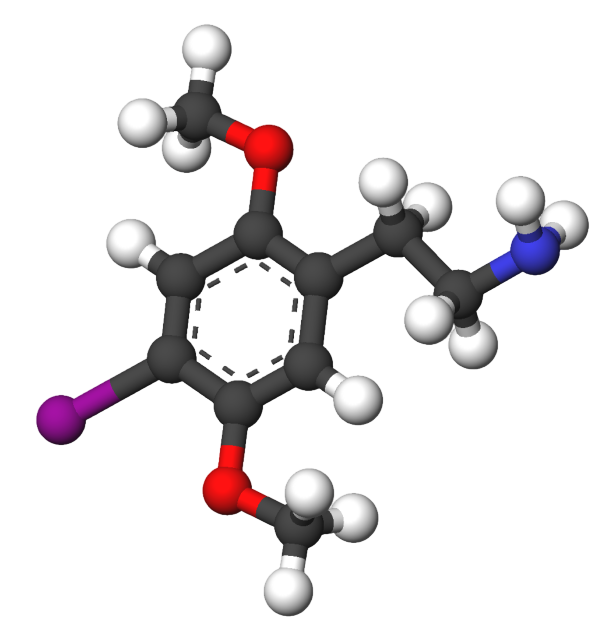

Clinical data
- Other names: 4-Iodo-2,5-dimethoxyphenethylamine; 2,5-Dimethoxy-4-iodophenethylamine; 25I; Cimbi-88; 2C-DOI
- Routes of administration: Oral
- Drug class: Serotonin 5-HT_{2} receptor agonist; Serotonin 5-HT_{2A} receptor agonist; Serotonergic psychedelic; Hallucinogen
- ATC code: None

Legal status
- Legal status: AU: S9 (Prohibited substance); BR: Class F2 (Prohibited psychotropics); CA: Schedule III; UK: Class A; US: Schedule I

Pharmacokinetic data
- Onset of action: ≤40 minutes
- Duration of action: 6–10 hours

Identifiers
- IUPAC name: 2-(4-iodo-2,5-dimethoxyphenyl)ethan-1-amine
- CAS Number: 69587-11-7
- PubChem CID: 10267191
- ChemSpider: 8442670
- UNII: S35362848V
- KEGG: C22776
- ChEMBL: ChEMBL338297
- CompTox Dashboard (EPA): DTXSID80893674
- ECHA InfoCard: 100.217.507

Chemical and physical data
- Formula: C_{10}H_{14}INO_{2}
- Molar mass: 307.131 g·mol^{−1}
- 3D model (JSmol): Interactive image
- Melting point: 246 °C (475 °F)
- SMILES: Ic1cc(OC)c(cc1OC)CCN
- InChI: InChI=1S/C10H14INO2/c1-13-9-6-8(11)10(14-2)5-7(9)3-4-12/h5-6H,3-4,12H2,1-2H3; Key:PQHQBRJAAZQXHL-UHFFFAOYSA-N

2C-I, also known as 4-iodo-2,5-dimethoxyphenethylamine, is a psychedelic drug of the phenethylamine and 2C families. It is taken orally.

2C-I was first synthesized and described by Alexander Shulgin in 1977 and was described in further detail in his 1991 book PiHKAL (Phenethylamines I Have Known and Loved). The drug is used recreationally. 2C-I is sometimes confused with other related psychedelic drugs such as 25I-NBOMe (NBOMe-2C-I), nicknamed "Smiles" and "N-bomb" in the media.

== Use and effects ==
In his book PiHKAL (Phenethylamines I Have Known and Loved), Alexander Shulgin lists 2C-I's dose as 14 to 22 mg orally and its duration as 6 to 10 hours. Its onset is within 40 minutes and peak effects occur after about 2 hours. 2C-I is reported to be administered orally or via insufflation, as documented by the U.S. Drug Enforcement Administration. The effects of 2C-I have been reported to include color enhancement, psychedelic visuals, emotional enhancement, limited insights, increased energy, enhanced conversation and honesty, improved mood, and sensual immersion. The sensual effects of 2C-I were described as different from and possibly less than those of 2C-B.

== Interactions ==
2C-I is metabolized by the monoamine oxidase (MAO) enzymes MAO-A and MAO-B. Monoamine oxidase inhibitors (MAOIs) such as phenelzine, tranylcypromine, moclobemide, and selegiline may potentiate the effects of 2C-I. This may result in overdose and serious toxicity.

== Pharmacology ==
=== Pharmacodynamics ===
2C-I activities
Target	Affinity (K_{i}, nM)
5-HT_{1A}	107–970 (K_{i}); 4,900 (EC_{50}); 102% (E_{max})
5-HT_{1B}	56
5-HT_{1D}	40
5-HT_{1E}	131
5-HT_{1F}	ND
5-HT_{2A}	3.5–9.3 (K_{i}); 1.48–513 (EC_{50}); 17–93% (E_{max})
5-HT_{2B}	9.3 (K_{i}); 19.1–150 (EC_{50}); 70–101% (E_{max})
5-HT_{2C}	9.3–40 (K_{i}); 0.46–537 (EC_{50}); 44–107% (E_{max})
5-HT_{3}	>10,000
5-HT_{4}	ND
5-HT_{5A}	>10,000
5-HT_{6}	ND
5-HT_{7}	1,316
α_{1A}	5,100–>10,000
α_{1B}	>10,000
α_{1D}	>10,000
α_{2A}	70–305
α_{2B}	608
α_{2C}	315
β_{1}	4,512
β_{2}	>10,000
β_{3}	ND
D_{1}	13,000
D_{2}	1,013–2,700
D_{3}	989–5,000
D_{4}	2,788
D_{5}	>10,000
H_{1}	6,100
H_{2}	>10,000
H_{3}	>10,000
M_{1}	>10,000
M_{2}	1,429
M_{3}	950
M_{4}	1,129
M_{5}	2,151
I_{1}	ND
σ_{1}	>10,000
σ_{2}	5,470
MOR	2,522
DOR	ND
KOR	>10,000
TAAR1	3,300 (K_{i}) (mouse); 120 (K_{i}) (rat); 2,400 (EC_{50}) (mouse); 190 (EC_{50}) (rat) >10,000 (EC_{50}) (human); 51% (E_{max}) (mouse); 50% (E_{max}) (rat)
SERT	950–4,900 (K_{i}); 5,600–13,000 (IC_{50}); IA (EC_{50})
NET	15,000 (K_{i}); 22,000 (IC_{50}); IA (EC_{50})
DAT	>30,000 (K_{i}); 126,000 (IC_{50}); IA (EC_{50})
MAO-A	125,000 (IC_{50})
MAO-B	55,000 (IC_{50})
Notes: The smaller the value, the more avidly the drug binds to the site. All proteins are human unless otherwise specified. Refs:

2C-I acts as a serotonin receptor agonist. It produces psychedelic effects via serotonin 5-HT_{2A} receptor activation.

It is inactive as a monoamine releasing agent and shows negligible activity as a monoamine reuptake inhibitor.

2C-I is a highly potent anti-inflammatory drug similarly to various other serotonergic psychedelics. However, 2C-I showed the highest anti-inflammatory potency of any other assessed drug in a large series in one study. It was more potent than (R)-DOI in terms of anti-inflammatory activity.

== Chemistry ==
=== Synthesis ===
The chemical synthesis of 2C-I has been described.

=== Analogues ===
Analogues of 2C-I include 2C-H (2,5-DMPEA), 2C-B, 2C-C, DOI, 4C-I, and 25I-NBOMe, among others.

== History ==
2C-I was first described in the scientific literature by Alexander Shulgin and colleagues in 1977. Its properties and effects in humans were described by Shulgin in 1978. The drug was subsequently described in greater detail by Shulgin in his 1991 book PiHKAL (Phenethylamines I Have Known and Loved). In the early 2000s, 2C-I was sold in Dutch smart shops as a recreational drug after the related drug 2C-B was banned.

== Society and culture ==
=== Religious use ===
2C-I was used as an entheogen for religious purposes by the Toronto-based Trans Human Church of Enlightenment in the early 2000s.

=== Legal status ===
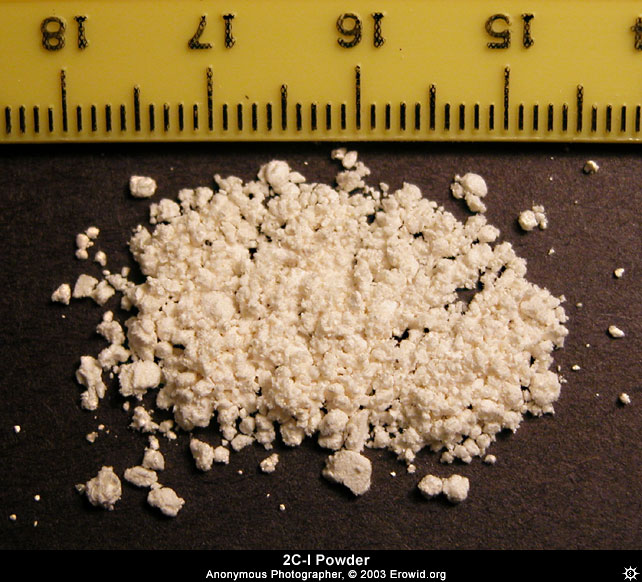
2C-I in powder form.

==== Australia ====
2C-I is a schedule 9 prohibited substance in Australia under the Poisons Standard (October 2015). A schedule 9 drug is outlined in the Poisons Act 1964 as "Substances which may be abused or misused, the manufacture, possession, sale or use of which should be prohibited by law except when required for medical or scientific research, or for analytical, teaching or training purposes with approval of the CEO".

==== Canada ====
As of October 31, 2016, 2C-I is a controlled substance (Schedule III) in Canada.

==== European Union ====
In December 2003, the European Council issued a binding order compelling all European Union member states to ban 2C-I within three months.

==== Finland ====
2C-I is illegal in Finland, scheduled in the "government decree on substances, preparations and plants considered to be narcotic drugs".

==== Sweden ====
In Sweden, the government classified 2C-I as a narcotic through SFS 2004:2, effective 1 March 2004. The Medical Products Agency subsequently listed it in List I of its narcotics schedules in LVFS 2004:3, which took effect on 15 March 2004.

==== United Kingdom ====
In the United Kingdom,2C-I is controlled as a Class A substance.

==== United States ====
As of July 9, 2012, in the United States 2C-I is a Schedule I substance under the Synthetic Drug Abuse Prevention Act of 2012, making possession, distribution and manufacture illegal. A previous bill, introduced in March 2011, that would have done the same passed the House of Representatives, but was not passed by the Senate.

== See also ==
- 2C (psychedelics), such as 2C-B-FLY
