= 5-DM-25B-NBOMe =

Clinical data
- Other names: 5-O-Desmethyl-25B-NBOMe; 5-OH-25B-NBOMe; N-(2-Methoxybenzyl)-4-bromo-5-hydroxy-2-methoxyphenethylamine
- Drug class: Serotonin receptor modulator; 5-HT_{2A} receptor agonist; 5-HT_{2C} receptor agonist
- ATC code: None

Identifiers
- IUPAC name: 2-bromo-4-methoxy-5-(2-{[(2-methoxyphenyl)methyl]amino}ethyl)phenol

Chemical and physical data
- Formula: C_{17}H_{20}BrNO_{3}
- Molar mass: 366.255 g·mol^{−1}
- 3D model (JSmol): Interactive image
- SMILES: COC1=C(CCN([H])CC2=C(OC)C=CC=C2)C=C(O[H])C(Br)=C1
- InChI: InChI=1S/C17H20BrNO3/c1-21-16-6-4-3-5-13(16)11-19-8-7-12-9-15(20)14(18)10-17(12)22-2/h3-6,9-10,19-20H,7-8,11H2,1-2H3; Key:IVVHUBRWCYPDHE-UHFFFAOYSA-N

5-DM-25B-NBOMe, also known as 5-O-desmethyl-25B-NBOMe, is a serotonin receptor modulator of the phenethylamine family related to the NBOMe psychedelic 25B-NBOMe. It is the 5-O-desmethyl analogue of 25B-NBOMe. The drug is a potent agonist of the serotonin 5-HT_{2A} and 5-HT_{2C} receptors. Its affinity (K_{i}), EC_{50}, and E_{max} values at the serotonin 5-HT_{2A} receptor were 2.24 nM, 1.20 nM, and 61%, respectively, whereas its values at the serotonin 5-HT_{2C} receptor were 10.5 nM, 0.617 nM, and 73%, respectively. At the serotonin 5-HT_{2A} receptor, the drug showed 11-fold lower affinity, 1.3-fold lower activational potency, and a numerical efficacy decrease of 22% compared to 25B-NBOMe. It is a major metabolite of 25B-NBOMe and is formed by cytochrome P450 enzymes. 5-DM-25B-NBOMe was first described in the scientific literature by 2016.

== See also ==
- 25-NB
- 2-OH-2C-B
- 5-DM-DOM
- 2-DM-DOM
