= Clausenamide =

Clinical data
- Drug class: Serotonin 5-HT_{2A} receptor agonist; Psychoplastogen
- ATC code: None

Identifiers
- IUPAC name: 3-hydroxy-5-[hydroxy(phenyl)methyl]-1-methyl-4-phenylpyrrolidin-2-one
- CAS Number: 103541-15-7
- PubChem CID: 5315946
- ChemSpider: 4475124

Chemical and physical data
- Formula: C_{18}H_{19}NO_{3}
- Molar mass: 297.354 g·mol^{−1}
- 3D model (JSmol): Interactive image
- SMILES: CN1C(C(C(C1=O)O)C2=CC=CC=C2)C(C3=CC=CC=C3)O
- InChI: InChI=1S/C18H19NO3/c1-19-15(16(20)13-10-6-3-7-11-13)14(17(21)18(19)22)12-8-4-2-5-9-12/h2-11,14-17,20-21H,1H3; Key:WGYGSZOQGYRGIP-UHFFFAOYSA-N

Clausenamide is an alkaloid found in Clausena lansium (wampee), an evergreen tree native to Southeast Asia and southern China. The compound has multiple chiral centers and many possible enantiomers or stereoisomers. Some of its isomers, especially (–)-cis-clausenamide, show psychoplastogenic effects that may be due to serotonin 5-HT_{2A} receptor partial agonism. In a BRET assay, (–)-cis-clausenamide showed modest potency and efficacy as a serotonin 5-HT_{2A} receptor partial agonist (EC_{50} = 490 nM; E_{max} = 28.4%). A number of other biological activities of clausenamide have also been described, and the compound has potential medical applications. Clausenamide was first isolated and described in the scientific literature by 1987. The psychoplastogenic activity of clausenamide was described by David E. Olson and colleagues in 2026.

== See also ==
- Cyclized phenethylamine
- Non-hallucinogenic 5-HT_{2A} receptor agonist
- List of miscellaneous 5-HT_{2A} receptor agonists
- 2C-B-PYR
