= LPH-5 (drug) =

Psychedelic drug

Clinical data
- Other names: (S)-3-(2,5-Dimethoxy-4-(trifluoromethyl)phenyl)piperidine; (S)-2C-TFM-3PIP; (S)-β,N-Trimethylene-2C-TFM
- Drug class: Selective serotonin 5-HT_{2A} receptor agonist; Serotonergic psychedelic; Hallucinogen; Antidepressant
- ATC code: None

Legal status
- Legal status: In general unscheduled

Identifiers
- IUPAC name: (S)-3-(2,5-Dimethoxy-4-(trifluoromethyl)phenyl)piperidine
- CAS Number: 2641630-97-7
- PubChem CID: 156337168
- ChemSpider: 129385919
- ChEMBL: ChEMBL5531940

Chemical and physical data
- Formula: C_{14}H_{18}F_{3}NO_{2}
- Molar mass: 289.298 g·mol^{−1}
- 3D model (JSmol): Interactive image
- SMILES: COC1=CC([C@@]2([H])CNCCC2)=C(OC)C=C1C(F)(F)F
- InChI: InChI=1S/C14H18F3NO2/c1-19-12-7-11(14(15,16)17)13(20-2)6-10(12)9-4-3-5-18-8-9/h6-7,9,18H,3-5,8H2,1-2H3/t9-/m1/s1; Key:NZKYTYHIERLZBG-SECBINFHSA-N

LPH-5, also known as (S)-3-(2,5-dimethoxy-4-(trifluoromethyl)phenyl)piperidine or as (S)-2C-TFM-3PIP, is a psychedelic drug of the phenethylamine, 2C, and 3-phenylpiperidine families which is under development for potential medical use. It is a cyclized phenethylamine and is the derivative of 2C-TFM in which the β position has been connected to the amine to form a piperidine ring.

== Pharmacology ==
=== Pharmacodynamics ===
LPH-5 acts as a potent partial agonist of the serotonin 5-HT_{2A} receptor (K_{i} = 1.3 nM, EC_{50} = 2.1–25 nM, E_{max} = 56–94%). It shows 10- to 100-fold selectivity for the 5-HT_{2A} receptor over the serotonin 5-HT_{2B} and 5-HT_{2C} receptors in terms of affinity and activational potency. Along with related compounds like 25CN-NBOH, DMBMPP, and TGF-8027, LPH-5 is said to be one of the few truly selective serotonin 5-HT_{2A} receptor agonists.

The drug robustly induces the head-twitch response as well as persistent and robust antidepressant-like effects in rodents. Owing to its high selectivity for the serotonin 5-HT_{2A} receptor, LPH-5 is expected to avoid the cardiac and other risks of serotonin 5-HT_{2B} receptor activation.

== Chemistry ==
=== Analogues ===
LPH-5's analogue LPH-48 is likewise a selective serotonin 5-HT_{2A} receptor agonist and psychedelic with similar characteristics. However, this drug has a shorter duration of action than LPH-5. As with LPH-5, LPH-48 is also under development by Lophora for potential medical use.

Another analogue of LPH-5 is 2T-2CTFM-3PIP (2-thio-LPH-5).

== History ==
LPH-5 was patented in 2021 and was first described in the scientific literature by Emil Märcher-Rørsted and colleagues in 2024. These researchers are affiliated with the Danish pharmaceutical company Lophora. In late 2025, LPH-5 was suggested as a possible alternative and replacement of DOI for use in scientific research.

== Society and culture ==
=== Legal status ===
==== Canada ====
LPH-5 is not an explicitly controlled substance in Canada as of 2025. However, as a derivative of 2Cs, it might fall under phenethylamine blanket-ban language, although as a cyclized phenethylamine this is unclear.

==== United States ====
LPH-5 is not an explicitly controlled substance in the United States. However, it could be considered a controlled substance under the Federal Analogue Act if intended for human consumption.

== Research ==
LPH-5 is under development by Lophora and Atai Beckley (formerly Atai Life Sciences and Beckley Psytech) for the potential treatment of major depressive disorder. As of May 2025, it is in phase I clinical trials for this indication.

== See also ==
- Cyclized phenethylamine
- Substituted 3-phenylpiperidine
- Partial ergoline
- List of investigational hallucinogens and entactogens
- 2C-B-3PIP
- 2C-B-morpholine
- 2C-B-PP
- 2C-B-PYR
- 2C-TFM
- CYB-210010
- UCD0120
- UCD0120-2C-D
- DMBMPP
- LPH-48
- OSU-6162
- TCB-2
- TGF-8027
- Z3517967757
- ZC-B
