= TCB-2 =

Psychedelic drug

- Racemic TCB-2 structure

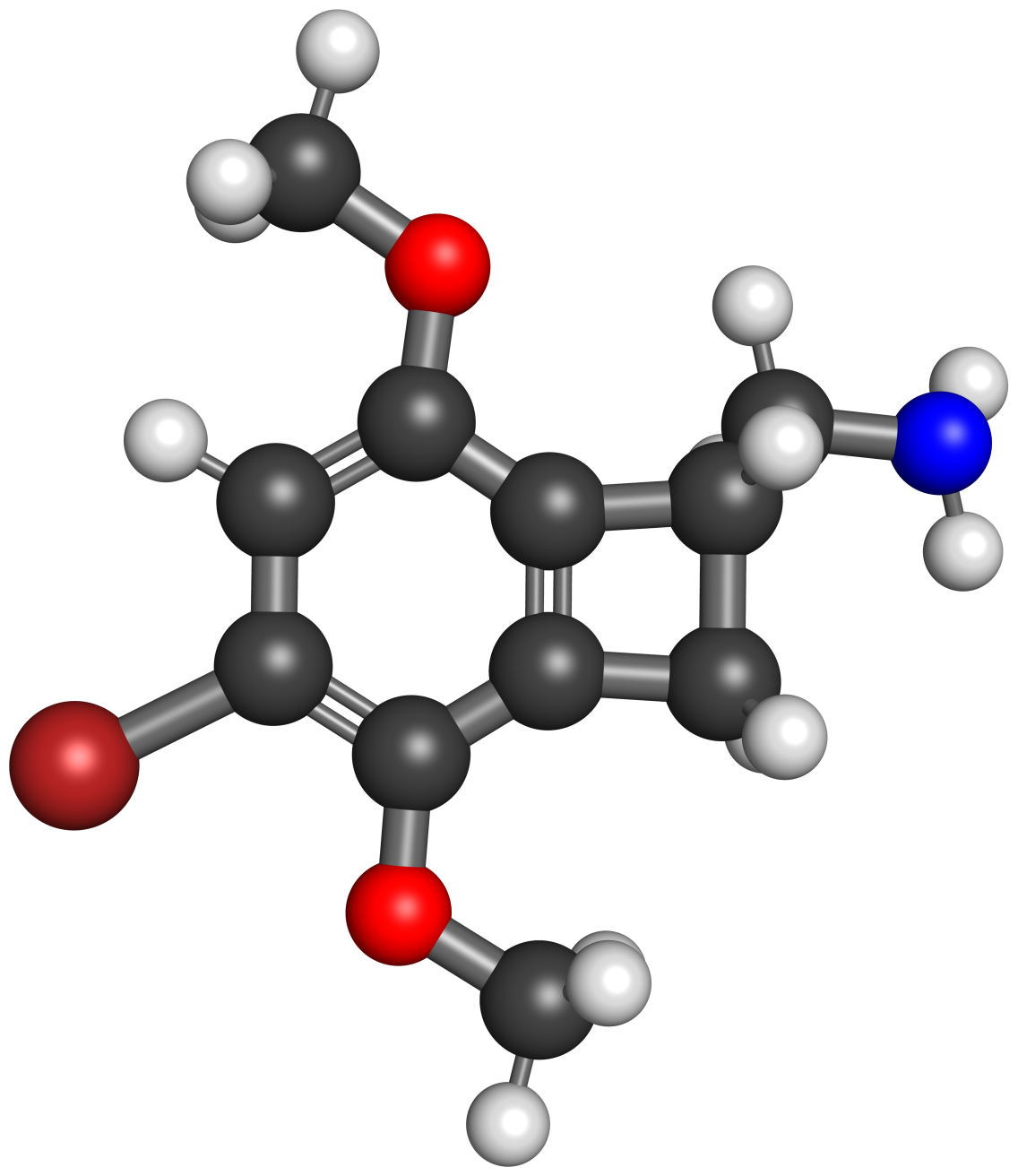
- TCB-2 ball-and-stick model

Clinical data
- Other names: 2CBCB; 2C-BCB; 6,β-Methylene-2C-B; 2C-TCB
- Routes of administration: Unknown
- Drug class: Serotonin receptor agonist; Serotonin 5-HT_{2A} receptor agonist; Serotonergic psychedelic; Hallucinogen
- ATC code: None

Legal status
- Legal status: In general unscheduled

Pharmacokinetic data
- Duration of action: Unknown

Identifiers
- IUPAC name: (3-bromo-2,5-dimethoxy-7-bicyclo[4.2.0]octa-1(6),2,4-trienyl)methanamine
- PubChem CID: 16046239
- ChemSpider: 13174651
- ChEBI: CHEBI:91625
- CompTox Dashboard (EPA): DTXSID201027451

Chemical and physical data
- Formula: C_{11}H_{14}BrNO_{2}
- Molar mass: 272.142 g·mol^{−1}
- 3D model (JSmol): Interactive image
- SMILES: COC1=CC(=C(C2=C1C(C2)CN)OC)Br
- InChI: InChI=1S/C11H14BrNO2/c1-14-9-4-8(12)11(15-2)7-3-6(5-13)10(7)9/h4,6H,3,5,13H2,1-2H3; Key:MPBCKKVERDTCEL-UHFFFAOYSA-N

TCB-2, also known as 2CBCB or 2C-BCB, is a putative psychedelic drug of the phenethylamine, 2C, and benzocyclobutene families related to 2C-B. It is a cyclized phenethylamine and is the derivative of 2C-B in which the β position has been connected to the 6 position by a methylene bridge to form a benzocyclobutene ring system. It is unclear whether TCB-2 produces hallucinogenic effects in humans and its route of administration and properties such as dose and duration are unknown.

The drug is a highly potent serotonin receptor agonist, including of the serotonin 5-HT_{2A} receptor among others. TCB-2 produces psychedelic-like effects in animals. It may be among the most potent known serotonin 5-HT_{2A} receptor agonists and psychedelic phenethylamines. TCB-2 is often employed as its more potent and selective enantiomer (R)-TCB-2 in scientific research.

TCB-2 was first described in the scientific literature by Thomas McLean and colleagues of the lab of David E. Nichols at Purdue University in 2006. It was encountered as a novel designer drug by 2018, though it appears to be very rare. The drug is not an explicitly controlled substance in the United States and is fully legal for use in scientific research in this country. TCB-2 was suggested as an alternative and replacement of the widely employed DOI for use in research in 2025.

== Use and effects ==
TCB-2 does not appear to have been formally tested in humans and its properties and effects are unknown. However, Daniel Trachsel has reported based on anonymous personal communication in 2009 that TCB-2 is psychoactive in the low-milligram range (route unspecified but presumably oral). No additional details were provided, including notably with regard to the nature of the effects. There are also a number of trip reports of TCB-2 on online forums, but such reports are unconfirmed and may not be reliable. In relation to the preceding, it has been said that there are no valid data on TCB-2 in humans.

== Pharmacology ==
=== Pharmacodynamics ===
(R)-TCB-2 activities
Target	Affinity (K_{i}, nM)
5-HT_{1A}	145 (K_{i}); 1.5–2,290 (EC_{50}); 28–54% (E_{max})
5-HT_{1B}	49 (K_{i}); 1.9–13 (EC_{50}); 87–100% (E_{max})
5-HT_{1D}	22 (K_{i}); 3.6–20 (EC_{50}); 95–107% (E_{max})
5-HT_{1E}	62 (K_{i}); 4.7–98 (EC_{50}); 100–112% (E_{max})
5-HT_{1F}	ND (K_{i}); 25–331 (EC_{50}); 96–110% (E_{max})
5-HT_{2A}	0.26–6.9 (K_{i}); 0.49–36 (EC_{50}); 68–101% (E_{max})
5-HT_{2B}	2.2 (K_{i}); 4.3–8.7 (EC_{50}); 82–90% (E_{max})
5-HT_{2C}	9.8 (K_{i}); 1.2–18 (EC_{50}); 64–96% (E_{max})
5-HT_{3}	>10,000
5-HT_{4}	ND
5-HT_{5A}	>10,000 (K_{i}); 28–135 (EC_{50}); 38–40% (E_{max})
5-HT_{6}	40 (K_{i}); 30 (EC_{50}); 80% (E_{max})
5-HT_{7}	42 (K_{i}); 1,740 (EC_{50}); 79% (E_{max})
α_{1A}–α_{1D}	>10,000
α_{2A}	661
α_{2B}	1,550
α_{2C}	447
β_{1}–β_{3}	>10,000
D_{1}, D_{2}	>10,000
D_{3}	186
D_{4}	2,290
D_{5}	>10,000
H_{1}	>10,000
H_{2}	5,620
H_{3}, H_{4}	>10,000
M_{1}–M_{5}	>10,000
TAAR_{1}	ND
I_{1}	ND
σ_{1}	603
σ_{2}	>10,000
SERT	>10,000 (K_{i}); ND (IC_{50})
NET	>10,000 (K_{i}); ND (IC_{50})
DAT	>10,000 (K_{i}); ND (IC_{50})
Notes: The smaller the value, the more avidly the drug binds to the site. All proteins are human unless otherwise specified. Refs:

TCB-2 acts as a potent agonist of the serotonin 5-HT_{2A} and 5-HT_{2C} receptors. Its affinity (K_{i}) for the serotonin 5-HT_{2A} receptor has been reported to be 0.75 nM and to be similar to that of 2C-B (K_{i} = 0.88 nM). The (R)-enantiomer shows 3-fold higher affinity for the serotonin 5-HT_{2A} receptor as well as 2-fold higher activational potency at this receptor. TCB-2 is a biased agonist of the serotonin 5-HT_{2A} receptor, showing 65-fold higher potency in stimulating phosphoinositide turnover than in activating arachidonic acid release. Besides the serotonin 5-HT_{2} receptors, TCB-2 might importantly stimulate the serotonin 5-HT_{1A} receptor. The comprehensive receptor interactions of TCB-2 have been studied. It is a potent agonist of the serotonin 5-HT_{1A}, 5-HT_{1B}, 5-HT_{1D}, 5-HT_{1E}, 5-HT_{1F}, 5-HT_{2A}, 5-HT_{2B}, and 5-HT_{2C} receptors, with the highest activity at the serotonin 5-HT_{2A} receptor.

(R)-TCB-2 has been found to substitute for LSD and DOI in rodent drug discrimination tests. It showed similar potency in this regard as LSD and 11- to 13-fold greater potency than DOI, making it one of the most potent known psychedelic drugs in this assay. In contrast to (R)-TCB-2, (S)-TCB-2 was inactive in the test even at a more than 10-fold higher dose. TCB-2 also produces the head-twitch response, another behavioral proxy of psychedelic effects, in rodents. However, in contrast to drug discrimination, the drug required surprisingly high doses to produce the head-twitch response, showing similar potency to that of DOI in this assay. This might be related to TCB-2's biased serotonin 5-HT_{2A} receptor agonism. In addition to its psychedelic-like effects, TCB-2 has been found to produce hyperlocomotion at lower doses and hypolocomotion at higher doses in rodents. The drug produces rapid antidepressant-, anti-anhedonic-, and anxiolytic-like effects in animals. TCB-2 shows anti-inflammatory effects in preclinical research, albeit with lower potency and efficacy than non-cyclized analogues. Unlike other psychedelic phenethylamines, TCB-2 produces some behavioral serotonin syndrome-like effects in rodents. Other animal studies have also been done.

== Chemistry ==
=== Synthesis ===
The chemical synthesis of TCB-2 has been described. The synthesis of TCB-2 has been described as tedious, such that its manufacture has been prevented from being economical, although it is still available commercially for use in scientific research.

=== Analogues ===
Analogues of TCB-2 include 2C-B, DOB, β-methyl-2C-B (BMB), tomscaline, 2CB-Ind, jimscaline, LPH-5, 2CBCB-NBOMe (NBOMe-TCB-2), and ZC-B, among others. 2CBCB-NBOMe, the NBOMe derivative of TCB-2, shows 2.7-fold higher affinity for the serotonin 5-HT_{2A} receptor than TCB-2 itself.

== History ==
TCB-2 was first described in the scientific literature by Thomas McLean and colleagues of the lab of David E. Nichols at Purdue University in 2006. At the time of its discovery, it was the most potent known phenethylamine psychedelic, with (R)-TCB-2 having similar potency as the better-known LSD, at least on the basis of rodent drug discrimination assays. However, subsequent studies using the head-twitch response found it to be much less potent. TCB-2 was reported to have been encountered as a novel designer drug by 2018, although it appears to be very rare. In late 2025, TCB-2 was suggested as an alternative and replacement of the widely employed DOI for use in research. This was due to DOI being poised to become a restricted Schedule I controlled substance in the United States.

== Society and culture ==
=== Availability ===
TCB-2 is commercially available for use in scientific research.

=== Legal status ===
==== Canada ====
TCB-2 is not a controlled substance in Canada as of 2025.

==== United States ====
TCB-2 is not a controlled substance in the United States. However, it could be considered an analogue of 2C-B under the Federal Analogue Act. In any case, as it is not an explicitly controlled substance, there are no restrictions on use of TCB-2 for scientific research purposes.

== See also ==
- Cyclized phenethylamine
- Substituted benzocyclobutene
- 2C (psychedelics)
