= 2,5-Dimethoxy-4-iodoamphetamine =

Chemical compound

DOI

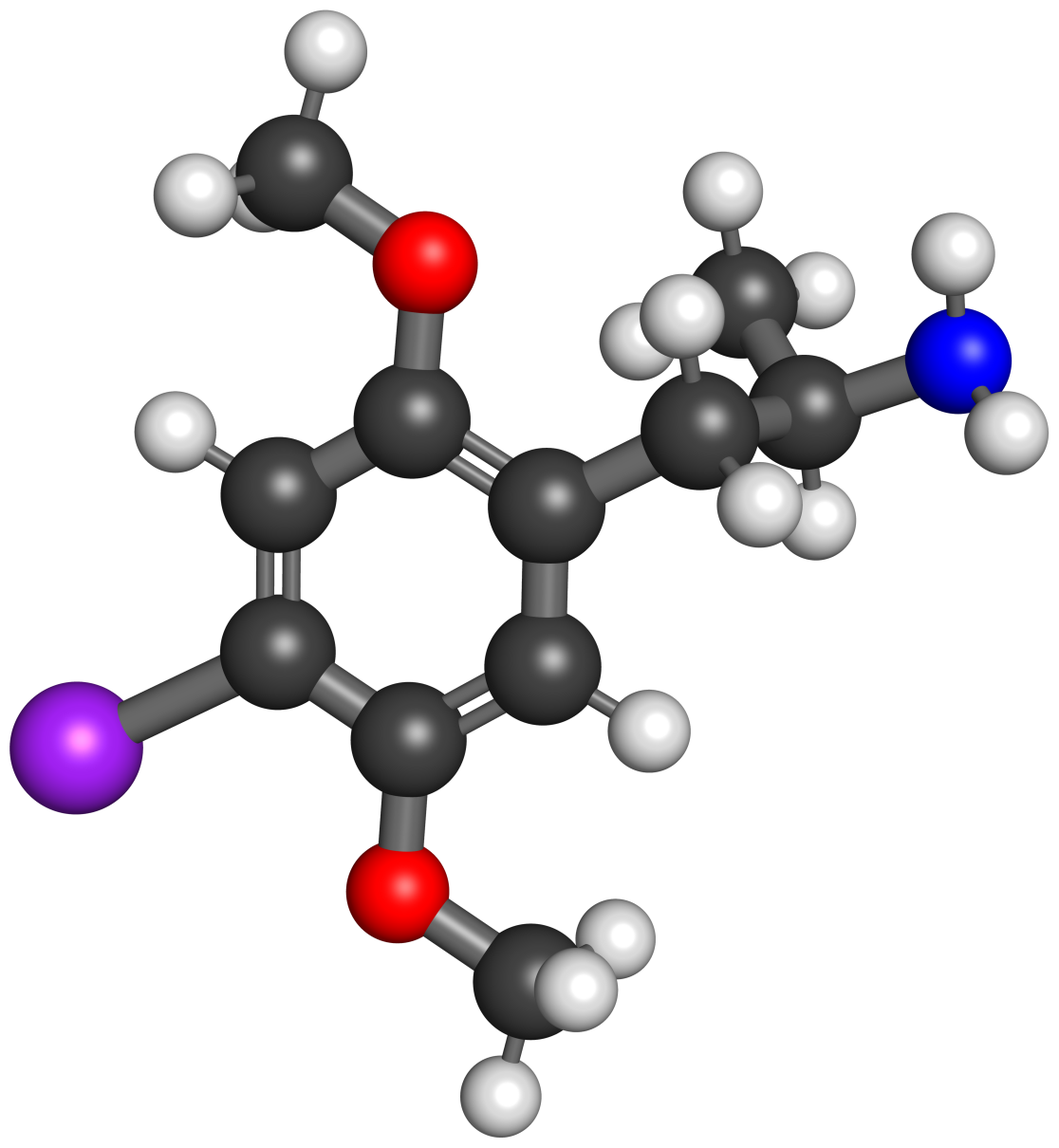

Clinical data
- Other names: DOI; 2,5-Dimethoxy-4-iodoamphetamine; 4-Iodo-2,5-dimethoxyamphetamine
- Routes of administration: Oral
- Drug class: Serotonergic psychedelic; Hallucinogen; Serotonin 5-HT_{2} receptor agonist; Anti-inflammatory agent
- ATC code: None

Legal status
- Legal status: BR: Class F2 (Prohibited psychotropics); CA: Schedule I

Pharmacokinetic data
- Duration of action: 16–30 hours

Identifiers
- IUPAC name: 1-(4-iodo-2,5-dimethoxyphenyl)propan-2-amine
- CAS Number: 64584-34-5 82864-06-0 ((R)-DOI) 99665-04-0 ((S)-DOI) 42203-78-1 (HCl)
- PubChem CID: 1229
- IUPHAR/BPS: 147
- ChemSpider: 1192
- UNII: Q2E57V2WS3
- ChEMBL: ChEMBL6616
- CompTox Dashboard (EPA): DTXSID7040520

Chemical and physical data
- Formula: C_{11}H_{16}INO_{2}
- Molar mass: 321.158 g·mol^{−1}
- 3D model (JSmol): Interactive image
- Melting point: 201.5 °C (394.7 °F) (hydrochloride)
- Solubility in water: 10 mg/mL
- SMILES: IC(C=C1OC)=C(OC)C=C1CC(C)N
- InChI: InChI=1S/C11H16INO2/c1-7(13)4-8-5-11(15-3)9(12)6-10(8)14-2/h5-7H,4,13H2,1-3H3; Key:BGMZUEKZENQUJY-UHFFFAOYSA-N

2,5-Dimethoxy-4-iodoamphetamine (DOI) is a psychedelic drug of the phenethylamine, amphetamine, and DOx families. It is little-used recreationally, but is widely used in scientific research in the study of psychedelics and serotonin receptors. The drug is taken orally.

It acts as a potent serotonin 5-HT_{2} receptor agonist, including of the serotonin 5-HT_{2A} and 5-HT_{2C} receptors. Analogues of DOI include 2C-I, DOB, DOC, DOM, and 25I-NBOMe, among others.

DOI was first described in the scientific literature by Ronald Coutts and Jerry Malicky in 1973. Subsequently, it was described in greater detail by Alexander Shulgin in his 1991 book PiHKAL (Phenethylamines I Have Known and Loved). DOI has been encountered as a novel designer drug. Owing to their very long and disagreeable durations however, DOI and other DOx drugs have seen very little recreational availability and use. Unlike many other psychedelic drugs, DOI is not an explicitly controlled substance in the United States. However, in 2023, the Drug Enforcement Administration (DEA) began taking steps to make DOI a controlled substance. As of late 2025, DOI is poised to become a Schedule I controlled substance in the United States.

== Use and effects ==
In his book PiHKAL (Phenethylamines I Have Known and Loved), Alexander Shulgin lists DOI's dose as 1.5 to 3 mg orally and its duration as 16 to 30 hours. The effects of DOI have been reported to include feelings of unreality, strangeness, closed-eye imagery, time dilation, having none of LSD's sparkle, depression and sadness, enhanced eroticism, lightheadedness, and spaciness, among others. It was said to have little or no body load. The (R)-enantiomer, (R)-DOI, was active at doses of 1.0 to 2.3 mg orally, whereas the (S)-enantiomer, (S)-DOI, was active at a dose of 6.3 mg orally.

== Interactions ==
It is unclear whether DOI may interact with monoamine oxidase inhibitors (MAOIs).

== Pharmacology ==
=== Pharmacodynamics ===
==== Actions ====
DOI activities
Target	Affinity (K_{i}, nM)
5-HT_{1A}	2,219–4,177
5-HT_{1B}	>10,000
5-HT_{1D}	458
5-HT_{1E}	1,013–2,970
5-HT_{1F}	1,739–2,511
5-HT_{2A}	0.46–165 (K_{i}); 0.42–57 (EC_{50}); 46–111% (E_{max})
5-HT_{2B}	1.4–336 (K_{i}); 1.4–39 (EC_{50}); 71–103% (E_{max})
5-HT_{2C}	1.8–48 (K_{i}); 0.14–178 (EC_{50}); 90–114% (E_{max})
5-HT_{3}	>10,000
5-HT_{4}	ND
5-HT_{5A}	>10,000
5-HT_{5B}	1,000 (rat)
5-HT_{6}	2,113
5-HT_{7}	5,769
α_{1A}	>10,000
α_{1B}	>10,000
α_{1D}	ND
α_{2A}	74
α_{2B}	340
α_{2C}	601
β_{1}	591
β_{2}	139
D_{1}	9,688
D_{2}–D_{5}	>10,000
H_{1}	1,757
H_{2}–H_{4}	>10,000
M_{1}	2,720
M_{2}	1,989
M_{3}	1,428
M_{4}	578
M_{5}	2,208
TAAR_{1}	>1,000
I_{1}	>10,000
σ_{1}	8,565
σ_{2}	9,172
SERT	685 (K_{i})
NET	>10,000 (K_{i})
DAT	>10,000 (K_{i})
MAO-A	37,000 (IC_{50})
MAO-B	>200,000 (IC_{50})
Notes: The smaller the value, the more avidly the drug binds to the site. All proteins are human unless otherwise specified. Refs:

DOI is a serotonin 5-HT_{2A}, 5-HT_{2B} and 5-HT_{2C} receptor agonist. It is said to be approximately 5- to 12-fold selective for the serotonin 5-HT_{2A} receptor over the serotonin 5-HT_{2C} receptor. The drug shows biased agonism at the serotonin 5-HT_{2C} receptor.

The drug is not a monoamine releasing agent of serotonin or dopamine.

DOI is an agonist of the rat trace amine-associated receptor 1 (TAAR1).

The compound has a stereocenter, and R-(−)-DOI is the more active stereoisomer. [^{125}I]-R-(−)-DOI is used as a radioligand and indicator of the presence of serotonin 5-HT_{2A} receptors in studies.

==== Effects ====
(R)-DOI and several other serotonergic psychedelics, including TCB-2, LSD, and LA-SS-Az, have been found to show potent inhibition of tumor necrosis factor alpha (TNFα)-induced inflammation. (R)-DOI was the most active of the assessed drugs and showed extremely high potency that was in the picomolar range and was an order of magnitude more potent than its action as a hallucinogen. TNFα may play a mediating role in the pathophysiology of degenerative inflammatory conditions like rheumatoid arthritis and Alzheimer's disease. (R)-DOI has also been found to block pulmonary inflammation, mucus hyperproduction, airway hyperresponsiveness, and to turn off key genes in pulmonary immune response, effects which block the development of allergic asthma in animal models. These findings could make DOI and other serotonin 5-HT_{2A} agonists novel treatments for inflammatory conditions.

DOI has been shown to induce rapid growth and reorganization of dendritic spines and synaptic connections with other neurons, processes known to underlie neuroplasticity, and hence to be a psychoplastogen.

DOI, along with other psychedelics, has been reported to produce serotonergic neurotoxicity in vitro and in rodents in vivo at high doses given repeatedly. Serotonin 5-HT_{2A} receptor antagonism or knockdown could partially but greatly block this neurotoxicity in vitro.

== Chemistry ==
DOI, also known as 2,5-dimethoxy-4-iodoamphetamine or as 2,5-dimethoxy-4-iodo-α-methylphenethylamine, is a substituted phenethylamine and amphetamine derivative and a member of the DOx family of drugs. It is structurally related to the naturally occurring phenethylamine psychedelic mescaline (3,4,5-trimethoxyphenethylamine).

=== Synthesis ===
The chemical synthesis of DOI has been described.

=== Analogues ===
Analogues of DOI include 2C-I, 4C-I, DOB, DOC, DOF, and DOM, among many others. Other analogues include N-methyl-DOI, IDNNA (N,N-dimethyl-DOI), DOI-NBOMe, and 25I-NBOMe, among others.

== History ==
DOI was first described in the scientific literature by Ronald Coutts and Jerry Malicky in 1973. Subsequently, it was described in greater detail by Alexander Shulgin in his 1991 book PiHKAL (Phenethylamines I Have Known and Loved). The radioactive iodine-125 form of DOI for PET imaging was first developed in the lab of David E. Nichols.

In January 2007, British police reported that three young men had fallen ill, reportedly, after taking DOI at a rave in Biggleswade, near Milton Keynes, and warned others who had taken it to seek medical attention. This would appear to be the first indication that DOI has found more widespread use as a recreational drug in the United Kingdom.

South Australian man Cody Edwards who brutally murdered Synamin Bell controversially plead guilty to the lesser sentence of manslaughter after attesting that the drug DOI had induced paranoia, and that he had subsequently acted in 'self-defence' when he had beaten the mother-of-three to death with a dumbbell, resulting in over fifty wounds.

As of late 2025, DOI is expected to become a Schedule I controlled substance in the United States.

== Society and culture ==
=== Scientific research ===
DOI is widely used in scientific research to study serotonergic psychedelics and the serotonin 5-HT_{2} receptors. This is in part due to the fact that it is not a controlled substance in the United States. However, DOI is poised to become a Schedule I controlled substance in this country in the near future, which will greatly restrict access to the drug. A number of alternatives to DOI have been suggested for use in research, including the non-selective serotonin 5-HT_{2A} receptor agonist TCB-2 and the selective serotonin 5-HT_{2A} receptor agonists 25CN-NBOH and LPH-5. Another notable but much more recent compound is TGF-8027, which is a highly selective serotonin 5-HT_{2A} receptor agonist and among the most selective such drugs currently known.

=== Legal status ===
==== Australia ====
The Standard for the Uniform Scheduling of Medicines and Poisons (SUSMP) of Australia does not list DOI as a prohibited substance.

==== Canada ====
Listed as a Schedule 1 as it is an analogue of amphetamine. The CDSA was updated as a result of the Safe Streets and Communities Act, changing amphetamines from Schedule 3 to Schedule 1.

==== Denmark ====
Illegal since 8 April 2007.

==== Finland ====
DOI is classified as a psychoactive substance banned from the consumer market in Finland.

==== Sweden ====
Sveriges riksdag added DOI to schedule I ("substances, plant materials and fungi which normally do not have medical use") as narcotics in Sweden as of August 30, 2007, published by Medical Products Agency in their regulation LVFS 2007:10 listed as DOI, 4-jod-2,5-dimetoxi-amfetamin.

==== United States ====
As of 2023, DOI is not scheduled in the United States. However, DOI may be considered an analog of other controlled DOx drugs like DOB, in which case, sales or possession could be prosecuted under the Federal Analogue Act. The drug's non-controlled status has made it usefully accessible for use in scientific research, which has contributed to its popularity for such uses.

In December 2023, the United States Drug Enforcement Administration (DEA) issued a notice of proposed rulemaking that would classify both DOI and DOC as schedule I controlled substances. However, in May 2024, it was reported that the DEA's June 10, 2024 hearing on scheduling of DOI and DOC had been postponed. This followed opposition to the proposal by psychedelic researchers. DOI is frequently used in scientific research due in considerable part to its non-scheduled status, and DOI becoming a controlled substance would cause problems for scientists. In any case, an administrative judge recommended placement of DOI into Schedule I in June 2025, and it is likely that the drug will be scheduled.

DOI is a Schedule I controlled substance in the state of Florida.

== See also ==
- DOx (psychedelics)
- 5-HT_{2A} receptor § Anti-inflammatory effects
