= 2CB-Ind =

Chemical compound

Clinical data
- Other names: 2CB-Indane
- Drug class: Serotonin receptor modulator; Serotonin 5-HT_{2A} receptor agonist
- ATC code: None

Legal status
- Legal status: In general: uncontrolled

Identifiers
- IUPAC name: (5-bromo-4,7-dimethoxy-2,3-dihydro-1H-inden-1-yl)methanamine
- CAS Number: 912342-23-5
- PubChem CID: 16086368
- ChemSpider: 17245022
- UNII: ZMP92SN5X2
- ChEMBL: ChEMBL424890
- CompTox Dashboard (EPA): DTXSID70582080

Chemical and physical data
- Formula: C_{12}H_{16}BrNO_{2}
- Molar mass: 286.169 g·mol^{−1}
- 3D model (JSmol): Interactive image
- SMILES: COC1=CC(=C(C2=C1C(CC2)CN)OC)Br
- InChI: InChI=1S/C12H16BrNO2/c1-15-10-5-9(13)12(16-2)8-4-3-7(6-14)11(8)10/h5,7H,3-4,6,14H2,1-2H3; Key:HCLPGYNQMVSQIM-UHFFFAOYSA-N

2CB-Ind is a conformationally-restricted derivative of the phenethylamine hallucinogen 2C-B which was developed by David E. Nichols and colleagues. It acts as a moderately potent and selective agonist for the 5-HT_{2A} and 5-HT_{2C} receptors, but unlike the corresponding benzocyclobutene derivative TCB-2 which is considerably more potent than the parent compound 2C-B, 2CB-Ind is several times weaker, with racemic 2CB-Ind having a K_{i} of 47nM at the human 5-HT_{2A} receptor, only slightly more potent than the mescaline analogue (R)-jimscaline.

== See also ==
- Cyclized phenethylamine
- AMMI
