= C10H15NO3 =

The molecular formula C_{10}H_{15}NO_{3} (molar mass: 197.23 g/mol) may refer to:

- 2-Carbomethoxytropinone
- Desglymidodrine
- hydroxydimethoxyphenethylamine
  - 3-O-Desmethylmescaline(3-hydroxy-4,5-dimethoxyphenethylamine)
  - 4-O-Desmethylmescaline(4-hydroxy-3,5-dimethoxyphenethylamine)
- Dioxifedrine
- DME (psychedelic)
- Ethylnorepinephrine
- Metanephrine
- Tenuazonic acid
- Trihydroxymethamphetamine
  - 2,4,5-Trihydroxymethamphetamine
