= BOx (psychedelics) =

Class of chemical compounds

BOD (β-methoxy-2C-D), a BOx psychedelic.

BOx, also known as β-oxygenated- and ring-substituted phenethylamines, are a group of psychedelic and other psychoactive drugs of the phenethylamine family. They have either a hydroxy group or methoxy group at the β position of the alkyl side chain as well as additional substitutions at the 2 through 5 positions of the phenyl ring.

Certain BOx drugs like BOB (β-methoxy-2C-B) have been found to act as serotonin 5-HT_{2A} receptor agonists.

The BOx drugs were described in the scientific literature by Alexander Shulgin, Peyton Jacob III, and Darrell Lemaire in 1985. They were subsequently further described by Shulgin in his 1991 book PiHKAL (Phenethylamines I Have Known and Loved). Additional BOx drugs like BOH-2C-B (BOHB; β-hydroxy-2C-B) and 3C-BOH (β-methoxy-MDA; BOMDA) were later described by Daniel Trachsel in 2013. In addition, BOHB emerged as a novel designer drug.

== Use and effects ==
Oral doses, durations, and effects of BOx drugs
Compound	Chemical name	Dose	Duration	Effects
BOB (β-methoxy-2C-B)	4-Bromo-2,5,β-trimethoxyphenethylamine	10–20 mg	10–20 hours	Visuals, altered state, tingling, tinnitus
BOHB (β-hydroxy-2C-B)	4-Bromo-2,5-dimethoxy-β-hydroxyphenethylamine	≥30 mg	Unknown	Novel designer drug, presumable psychedelic
BOD (β-methoxy-2C-D)	4-Methyl-2,5,β-trimethoxyphenethylamine	15–25 mg	8–16 hours	Visuals, enhanced conversation, nausea, lethargy
BOED (β-ethoxy-2C-D)	4-Methyl-2,5-dimethoxy-β-ethoxyphenethylamine	70–75 mg	10 hours	Intoxication, no visuals, appetite loss, diuresis
BOHD (β-hydroxy-2C-D)	4-Methyl-2,5-dimethoxy-β-hydroxyphenethylamine	>50 mg	Unknown	Marked drop in blood pressure
β-MeO-DOB (AL-37662)	4-Bromo-2,5-dimethoxy-β-methoxyamphetamine	Unknown	Unknown	Unknown
BOH (β-methoxy-MDPEA)	3,4-Methylenedioxy-β-methoxyphenethylamine	80–120 mg	6–8 hours	Warmth, mydriasis, anorexia, nausea, cold feet
BOHH (β-hydroxy-MDPEA)	3,4-Methylenedioxy-β-hydroxyphenethylamine	>100 mg	Unknown	Few or no effects
3C-BOH (β-methoxy-MDA)	3,4-Methylenedioxy-β-methoxyamphetamine	40–70 mg	3–6 hours	Stimulation, physical effects, body stiffness
BOM (β-methoxymescaline)	3,4,5,β-Tetramethoxyphenethylamine	>200 mg	Unknown	Few or no effects
β-HOM (β-hydroxymescaline)	3,4,5-Trimethoxy-β-hydroxyphenethylamine	Unknown	Unknown	Unknown
DME (β-hydroxy-3,4-DMPEA)	3,4-Dimethoxy-β-hydroxyphenethylamine	>115 mg	Unknown	Few or no effects
Refs:

On the basis of the preceding findings, of the BOx drugs, BOB and BOD are the only drugs clearly known to produce psychedelic effects.

Chemical structures of BOx compounds
BOB (β-methoxy-2C-B)

BOHB (β-hydroxy-2C-B)

BOD (β-methoxy-2C-D)

BOED (β-ethoxy-2C-D)

BOHD (β-hydroxy-2C-D)

β-MeO-DOB (AL-37662)

BOH (β-methoxy-MDPEA)

BOHH (β-hydroxy-MDPEA)

3C-BOH (β-methoxy-MDA)

BOM (β-methoxymescaline)

β-HOM (β-hydroxymescaline)

DME (β-hydroxy-3,4-DMPEA)

== Related compounds ==
Other related β-substituted compounds including βk-2C-B (β-keto-2C-B), βk-DOB (β-keto-DOB), β-methyl-2C-B (BMB), and β-methyl-DOM (Daphne, Elvira) have also been described.

== See also ==
- Substituted methoxyphenethylamine
- Butaxamine (β-hydroxy-N-tert-butyl-2,5-DMA)
- Desglymidodrine (β-hydroxy-2C-H)
- Dimetofrine (β-hydroxy-N-methyl-4-O-desmethylmescaline)
- Methoxamine (β-hydroxy-2,5-DMA)
- Midodrine (β-hydroxy-N-(aminoethanonyl)-2C-H)
