= Hydroxy-2C-B =

Hydroxy-2C-B, also known as hydroxy-4-bromo-2,5-dimethoxyphenethylamine, may refer to:

- N-Hydroxy-2C-B (2C-B-OH)
- β-Hydroxy-2C-B (BOH-2C-B, BOHB)

== See also ==
- 2C (psychedelics)
- Methyl-2C-B
- β-Methoxy-2C-B (BOB)
- β-Keto-2C-B
