= C11H17NO4 =

The molecular formula C_{11}H_{17}NO_{4} (molar mass: 227.26 g/mol) may refer to:

- Dimetofrine
- 3,4,5-Trimethoxyphenoxyethylamine
- β-Hydroxymescaline
