= BOM (drug) =

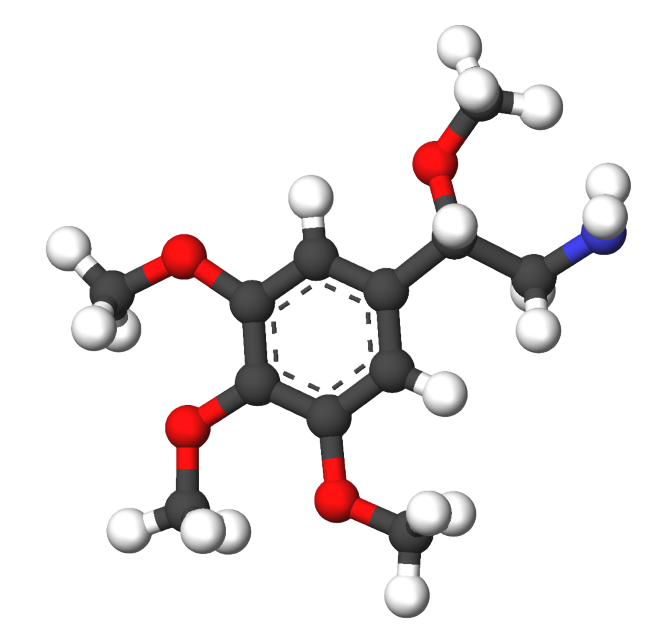

Clinical data
- Other names: 3,4,5,β-Tetramethoxyphenethylamine; β-Methoxymescaline; β-MeO-mescaline; β-MeO-3,4,5-TMPEA; β-Methoxy-3,4,5-TMPEA; β-MeO-TMPEA
- Routes of administration: Oral
- Drug class: Psychoactive drug
- ATC code: None

Identifiers
- IUPAC name: 2-methoxy-2-(3,4,5-trimethoxyphenyl)ethan-1-amine
- CAS Number: 98537-40-7
- PubChem CID: 44719490
- ChemSpider: 21106265
- UNII: ZYL4Q2506P
- CompTox Dashboard (EPA): DTXSID30660353

Chemical and physical data
- Formula: C_{12}H_{19}NO_{4}
- Molar mass: 241.287 g·mol^{−1}
- 3D model (JSmol): Interactive image
- SMILES: COc1c(cc(cc1OC)C(CN)OC)OC
- InChI: InChI=1S/C12H19NO4/c1-14-9-5-8(11(7-13)16-3)6-10(15-2)12(9)17-4/h5-6,11H,7,13H2,1-4H3; Key:GAKIJEPUVBHWCK-UHFFFAOYSA-N

BOM, also known as 3,4,5,β-tetramethoxyphenethylamine or as β-methoxymescaline, is a psychoactive drug of the phenethylamine, scaline, and BOx families related to mescaline. It is the β-methoxy derivative of mescaline.

== Use and effects ==
In his book PiHKAL (Phenethylamines I Have Known and Loved), Alexander Shulgin lists BOM's dose as greater than 200 mg orally and its duration as unknown. Some indications of threshold central effects were observed at doses of 120 and 180 mg orally, but higher doses were not explored. BOx drugs are known to be less potent than their non-β-substituted counterparts, so BOM might be active in the range of 200 to 400 mg orally according to Shulgin, but this remains unknown.

== Chemistry ==
=== Synthesis ===
The chemical synthesis of BOM has been described.

=== Analogues ===
Analogues of BOM include β-hydroxymescaline (β-HOM; mescalol), BOH (β-methoxy-MDPEA), BOD (β-methoxy-2C-D), and DME (β-hydroxy-3,4-DMPEA), among others.

== History ==
BOM was briefly mentioned by Abram Hoffer and Humphrey Osmond in their 1967 book The Hallucinogens. Subsequently, it was described in greater detail by Alexander Shulgin, Peyton Jacob III, and Darrell Lemaire in 1985. In addition, it was described in further detail by Shulgin in his 1991 book PiHKAL (Phenethylamines I Have Known and Loved).

== Society and culture ==
=== Legal status ===
==== Canada ====
BOM is not a controlled substance in Canada as of 2025.

==== United Kingdom ====
This substance is a Class A drug in the Drugs controlled by the UK Misuse of Drugs Act.

== See also ==
- Scaline
- BOx (psychedelics)
