= C12H18BrNO3 =

The molecular formula C_{12}H_{18}BrNO_{3} (molar mass: 304.184 g/mol) may refer to:

- 2-Bromo-TMA, or 2-bromo-3,4,5-trimethoxyamphetamine
- β-Methoxy-2,5-dimethoxy-4-bromoamphetamine
