= C9H13NO3 =

The molecular formula C_{9}H_{13}NO_{3} (molar mass: 183.20 g/mol, exact mass: 183.089543) may refer to:

- Adrenaline, also known as epinephrine
- Ginkgotoxin
- 3-Methoxy-4,5-dihydroxyphenethylamine
- Nordefrin (corbadrine, levonordefrin), a catecholamine
- Normetanephrine
- Racepinefrine
- 2,4,5-Trihydroxyamphetamine
