= Β-MeO-DOB =

β-MeO-DOB

Clinical data
- Other names: β-Methoxy-DOB; 3C-BOB; β-Methoxy-4-bromo-2,5-dimethoxyamphetamine; AL-37662; AL37662
- Drug class: Peripherally selective serotonin 5-HT_{2A} receptor agonist
- ATC code: None

Identifiers
- IUPAC name: 1-(4-bromo-2,5-dimethoxyphenyl)-1-methoxypropan-2-amine
- PubChem CID: 58644857; AL-37662: 10363198
- ChemSpider: 138594718; AL-37662: 8538647
- ChEMBL: AL-37662: ChEMBL365958

Chemical and physical data
- Formula: C_{12}H_{18}BrNO_{3}
- Molar mass: 304.184 g·mol^{−1}
- 3D model (JSmol): Interactive image
- SMILES: CC(C(C1=CC(=C(C=C1OC)Br)OC)OC)N
- InChI: InChI=1S/C12H18BrNO3/c1-7(14)12(17-4)8-5-11(16-3)9(13)6-10(8)15-2/h5-7,12H,14H2,1-4H3; Key:JZRYUHHXNUHBTB-UHFFFAOYSA-N

β-MeO-DOB, also known as 3C-BOB or β-methoxy-4-bromo-2,5-dimethoxyamphetamine and by the developmental code name AL-37662 (specifically the (1R,2R)- enantiomer), is an experimental putative psychedelic drug which has a markedly reduced ability to cross the blood–brain barrier. The compound was developed and evaluated as a peripheral agent for topical application (in the form of eye drops) with the aim of reducing intraocular pressure in glaucoma.

== Pharmacology ==
=== Pharmacodynamics ===
AL-37662 acts as a full 5-HT_{2A} receptor agonist with an affinity (K_{i}) of 0.3 nM; it successfully reduced intraocular pressure by 20 to 27% when administered topically. If administered directly into the brain or taken by any means other than as eye drops in high doses, it may cause psychedelic effects; however, when administered as therapeutic eye drops in microdoses (300 µg), AL-37662 did not produce any effects.

== Chemistry ==
β-MeO-DOB is a mixture of multiple enantiomers. The (1R,2R)- enantiomer is AL-37662.

=== Synthesis ===
The chemical synthesis of β-MeO-DOB has been described.

=== Analogues ===
Analogues of β-MeO-DOB include β-HO-DOB (β-hydroxy-DOB; 3C-BOHB), βk-DOB (β-keto-DOB), and BOB (β-methoxy-2C-B), among others.

== History ==
AL-37662 was first described in the scientific literature by Richard Glennon and colleagues in 2004.

== See also ==
- DOx (psychedelics)
- BOx (psychedelics)
