= 3-Methoxy-4,5-dihydroxyphenethylamine =

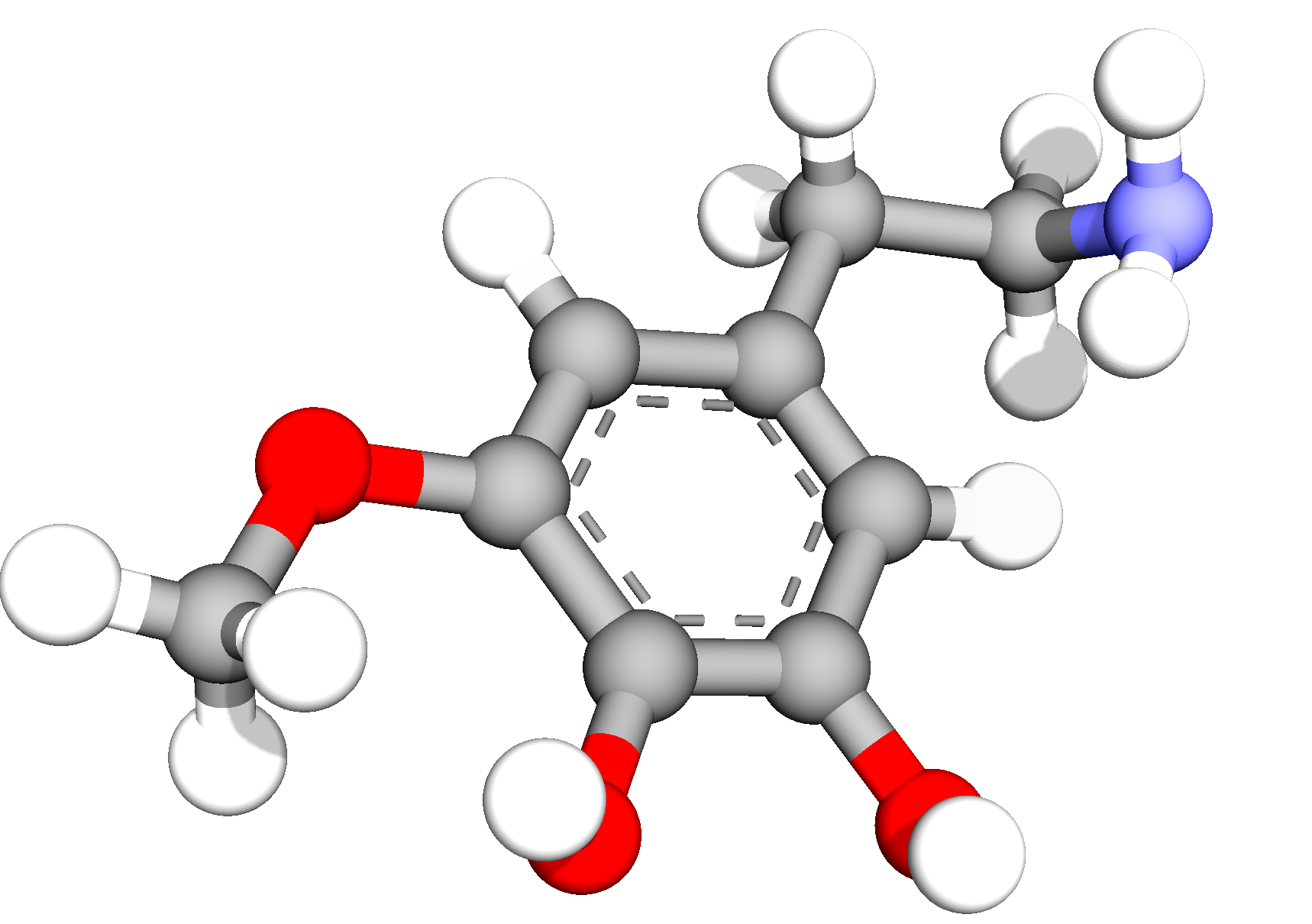

Names
- IUPAC name 5-(2-aminoethyl)-3-methoxybenzene-1,2-diol
- Other names 4-O-,5-O-Didesmethylmescaline; 3,4-Dihydroxy-5-methoxyphenethylamine; 3,4-DESMETHYL

Identifiers
3D model (JSmol)	Interactive image
ChemSpider	26492112
PubChem CID	54382520
- InChI: InChI=1S/C9H13NO3/c1-13-8-5-6(2-3-10)4-7(11)9(8)12/h4-5,11-12H,2-3,10H2,1H3 Key: VAXRELHTGBYXIA-UHFFFAOYSA-N
- SMILES: COC1=CC(=CC(=C1O)O)CCN

Properties
Chemical formula	C_{9}H_{13}NO_{3}
Molar mass	183.207 g·mol^{−1}
- Except where otherwise noted, data are given for materials in their standard state (at 25 °C [77 °F], 100 kPa). Infobox references

3-Methoxy-4,5-dihydroxyphenethylamine (3-MeO-4,5-diOH-PEA), also known as 4-O-,5-O-didesmethylmescaline, is a phenylethylamine alkaloid and an important intermediate metabolite in the biosynthesis of mescaline within the peyote cactus (Lophophora williamsii), but is also found in various other plant species.

== Biosynthesis ==
Mescaline biosynthesis in Lophophora williamsii begins with the conversion of L-tyrosine to L-DOPA by LwCYP76AD94, which is decarboxylated to dopamine (LwTYDC), which is then 3-O-methylated to 3-methoxytyramine by one of two O-methyltransferases (LwOMT2 or LwOMT6), 5-hydroxylated by cytochrome CYP76AD131 to 3-methoxy-4,5-dihydroxyphenylethylamine, then methylated by LwOMT2 at position 5 to form 3,5-dimethoxy-4-hydroxyphenylethylamine and finally by LwOMT10 at position 4 to form mescaline.

3-Methoxy-4,5-dihydroxyphenethylamine is the primary intermediate in the synthesis of the tetrahydroisoquinoline alkaloid lophophorine. This process likely involves the enzyme LwOMT10, which catalyzes methylation at position 4 or 5 to yield 3,4-dimethoxy-5-hydroxyphenethylamine. The latter is subsequently N-methylated by LwNMT to form N-methyl-3,4-dimethoxy-5-hydroxyphenethylamine, which is eventually converted into lophophorine.

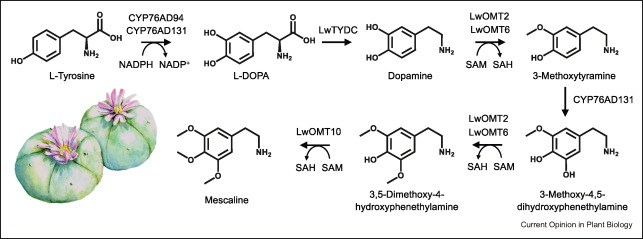
Overview of mescaline biosynthesis pathway within Peyote.

== Occurrence ==
3-Methoxy-4,5-dihydroxyphenethylamine has been found in the following plant species: Senegalia berlandieri, Echinopsis spachiana, Austrocylindropuntia cylindrica, Vachellia rigidula and Lophophora williamsii.

== See also ==
- Scaline
