= 5-DM-DOM =

Clinical data
- Other names: 5-O-Desmethyl-DOM; 5-DES-Me-DOM; 5-OH-DOM; 5-Hydroxy-DOM; 5-HMMP; 5-Hydroxy-2-methoxy-4-methylamphetamine; 2-Methoxy-5-hydroxy-4-methylamphetamine
- Drug class: Serotonin receptor modulator; Serotonin 5-HT_{2} receptor modulator; Serotonergic psychedelic; Hallucinogen
- ATC code: None

Identifiers
- IUPAC name: 5-(2-aminopropyl)-4-methoxy-2-methylphenol
- CAS Number: 60113-84-0
- PubChem CID: 44385952
- ChemSpider: 23241852
- ChEMBL: ChEMBL177800
- CompTox Dashboard (EPA): DTXSID30658634

Chemical and physical data
- Formula: C_{11}H_{17}NO_{2}
- Molar mass: 195.262 g·mol^{−1}
- 3D model (JSmol): Interactive image
- SMILES: CC1=CC(=C(C=C1O)CC(C)N)OC
- InChI: InChI=1S/C11H17NO2/c1-7-4-11(14-3)9(5-8(2)12)6-10(7)13/h4,6,8,13H,5,12H2,1-3H3; Key:UVEGZSXIBVSOJB-UHFFFAOYSA-N

5-DM-DOM, also known as 5-O-desmethyl-DOM, 5-OH-DOM, or 5-hydroxy-2-methoxy-4-methylamphetamine (5-HMMP), is a psychedelic drug of the phenethylamine and amphetamine families related to the DOx psychedelic DOM (2,5-dimethoxy-4-methylamphetamine; STP). It has been identified as an active metabolite of DOM in animals. The drug is one of two possible O-demethylated analogues and metabolites of DOM, the other being 2-DM-DOM (2-O-desmethyl-DOM; 2-OH-DOM; 2-HMMP).

== Use and effects ==
The properties and effects of 5-DM-DOM in humans have not been reported and are unknown.

== Pharmacology ==
5-DM-DOM shows affinity for the serotonin 5-HT_{2A} and 5-HT_{2C} receptors (K_{i} = 210 nM and 500 nM, respectively). Its affinity for the serotonin 5-HT_{2A} receptor was about 1.75-fold lower than that of DOM. In another earlier study, the drug's affinity (K_{i}) was 200 nM for the serotonin 5-HT_{2} receptor, with this being about 2-fold lower than that of DOM. Conversely, in another later study, its affinity (K_{0.5}) was 4.8 nM for the serotonin 5-HT_{2A} receptor and was about the same as that of DOM (which was 4.4 nM). In addition, 5-DM-DOM was shown to be an agonist of the serotonin 5-HT_{2A} receptor, with an EC_{50} (E_{max}) of 18.1 nM (101%), relative to 19.3 nM (95%) in the case of DOM.

5-DM-DOM fully generalized to (–)-DOM (the more active psychedelic enantiomer of DOM) and LSD in rodent drug discrimination tests. It produced 87.5% (–)-DOM-appropriate responding at a dose of 0.3 mg/kg and 94% LSD-appropriate responding at a dose of 3.0 mg/kg. For comparison, the training dose of (–)-DOM was 0.6 mg/kg. The drug's substitution was inhibited by the selective serotonin 5-HT_{2A} receptor antagonist volinanserin (MDL-100907). An earlier study on the other hand found that 5-DM-DOM across a dose range of 1.0 to 3.0 mg/kg failed to substitute for racemic DOM at a training dose of 1.0 mg/kg, with 5-DM-DOM at 1.0 to 2.0 mg/kg producing insignificant substitution (3–12%) and the 3.0 mg/kg dose producing behavioral disruption. The drug's ED_{50} could not be calculated nor compared with that of DOM or (–)-DOM in this study.

DOM shows an unusually delayed onset of effects in animals and humans compared to other psychedelics like LSD and mescaline. In rats, DOM produces peak interoceptive effects after 60 minutes, whereas LSD and mescaline do so after only 15 minutes. This cannot be explained by delayed uptake of DOM into the brain, as maximal brain levels of (–)-DOM in rats occur after 15 to 30 minutes. Based on these findings, it was theorized that DOM's delayed onset of effects might be due to formation of active metabolites such as 2-DM-DOM and 5-DM-DOM. As a result of their free hydroxyl group and consequent greater polarity, these metabolites are expected to cross the blood–brain barrier more slowly than DOM. The hypothesis was tested, but it could not be unequivocally accepted nor rejected. Both metabolites were said to be less potent than DOM itself. In any case, the metabolites showed a delayed time to peak interoceptive effects similarly to DOM in rats.

There have been concerns that 5-DM-DOM might be neurotoxic. This is because DOM has been found to undergo bis-demethylation into 2,5-DDM-DOM followed by subsequent oxidation to a reactive alkylating para-quinone and/or cyclic iminoquinone. The properties of the hydroquinone DOM metabolite have been said to parallel those of the monoaminergic neurotoxin 6-hydroxydopamine.

== Chemistry ==
The predicted log P of 5-DM-DOM is 1.9 and of DOM is 2.2.

== History ==
5-DM-DOM was first described in the scientific literature as a DOM metabolite the mid-1970s. Subsequently, its pharmacology was described by Richard Glennon and colleagues in the early-to-mid 1980s and in the early 2000s.

== See also ==
- DOx (psychedelics)
- 2,5-DDM-DOM
- 2-OH-2C-B
- 5-DM-25B-NBOMe
- 3-O-Desmethylmescaline
- 4-O-Desmethylmescaline
