= BOED =

Clinical data
- Other names: 4-Methyl-2,5-dimethoxy-β-ethoxyphenethylamine; 2,5-Dimethoxy-β-ethoxy-4-methylphenethylamine; 2,5-Dimethoxy-4-methyl-β-ethoxyphenethylamine; β-Ethoxy-2C-D; β-EtO-2C-D
- Routes of administration: Oral
- Drug class: Psychoactive drug
- ATC code: None

Pharmacokinetic data
- Duration of action: 10 hours

Identifiers
- IUPAC name: 2-(2,5-dimethoxy-4-methylphenyl)-2-ethoxyethan-1-amine

Chemical and physical data
- Formula: C_{13}H_{21}NO_{3}
- Molar mass: 239.315 g·mol^{−1}
- 3D model (JSmol): Interactive image
- SMILES: CCOC(c1cc(OC)c(cc1OC)C)CN
- InChI: InChI=1S/C13H21NO3/c1-5-17-13(8-14)10-7-11(15-3)9(2)6-12(10)16-4/h6-7,13H,5,8,14H2,1-4H3; Key:LZNFMACBNUDNGO-UHFFFAOYSA-N

BOED, also known as 4-methyl-2,5-dimethoxy-β-ethoxyphenethylamine or as β-ethoxy-2C-D, is a psychoactive drug of the phenethylamine, 2C, and BOx families. It is the β-ethoxy derivative of 2C-D and homologue of BOD (β-methoxy-2C-D). The drug was briefly described by Alexander Shulgin in his 1991 book PiHKAL (Phenethylamines I Have Known and Loved). Its dose was said to be 70 to 75 mg orally and its duration was 10 hours. The drug was said to be about 3-fold less potent than BOD. Its effects included a highly intoxicated state, no visual effects, appetite suppression, and diuresis. The chemical synthesis of the drug was also briefly described. It is a controlled substance in Canada under phenethylamine blanket-ban language.

== See also ==
- BOx (psychedelics)
- 2C (psychedelics)
