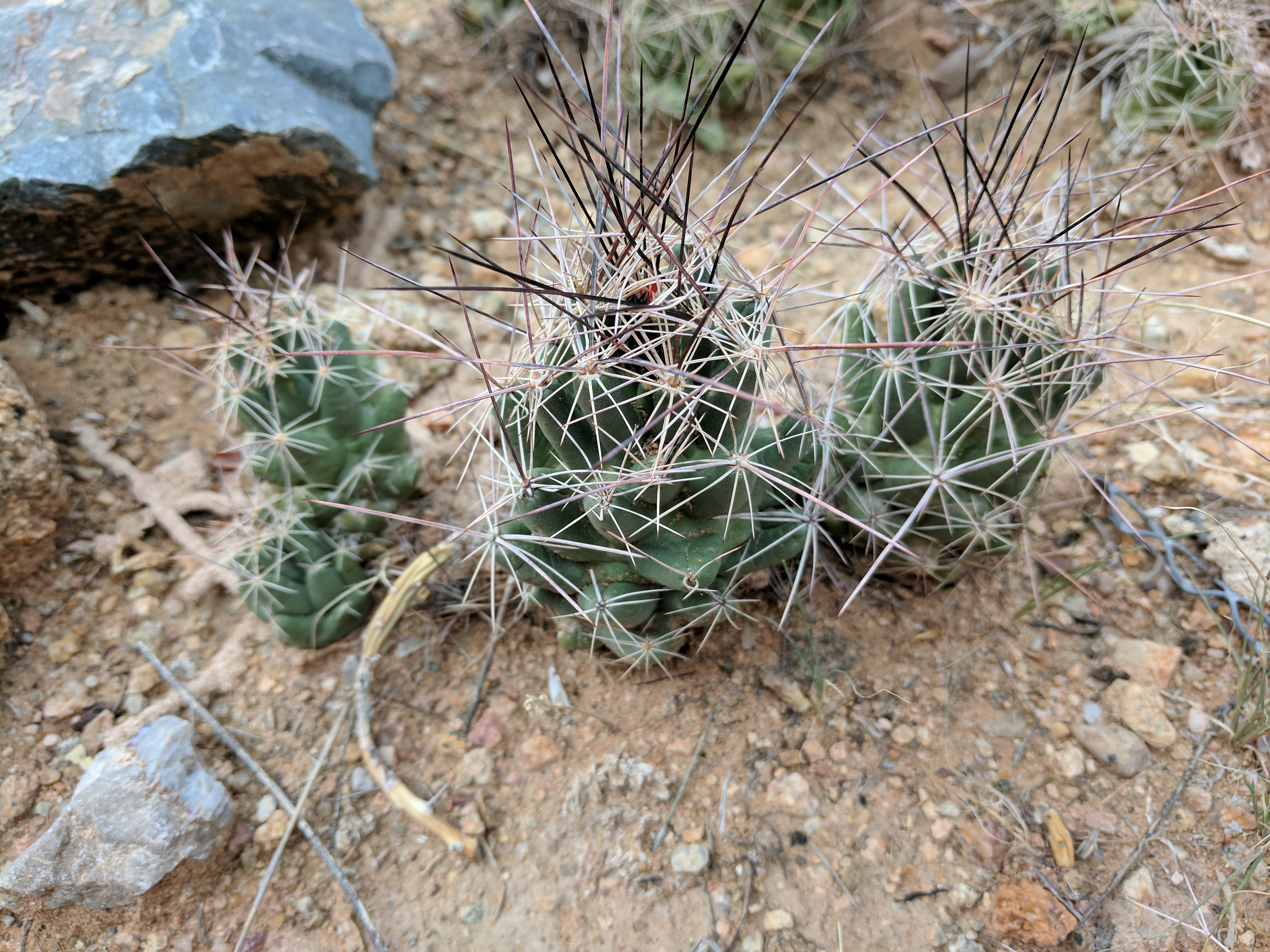

Conservation status
- Least Concern (IUCN 3.1)

Scientific classification
- Kingdom: Plantae
- Clade: Tracheophytes
- Clade: Angiosperms
- Clade: Eudicots
- Order: Caryophyllales
- Family: Cactaceae
- Subfamily: Cactoideae
- Genus: Pelecyphora
- Species: P. macromeris

Binomial name
- Pelecyphora macromeris (Engelm.) D.Aquino & Dan.Sánchez

Synonyms
- Cactus macromeris (Engelm.) Kuntze 1891; Coryphantha macromeris (Engelm.) Britton & Rose 1923; Echinocactus macromeris (Engelm.) Poselg. 1853; Lepidocoryphantha macromeris (Engelm.) Backeb. 1942; Mammillaria macromeris Engelm. 1848

= Pelecyphora macromeris =

Species of cactus

Pelecyphora macromeris, the nipple beehive cactus, is a species of cactus in the United States and Mexico. In the Chihuhuan Desert, it is common and has a wide range.

== Description ==
Pelecyphora macromeris usually forms groups up to 15 centimeters high and 100 centimeters in diameter. The roots are fleshy. The spherical to cylindrical, dark green to blue-green, occasionally gray-green over time, somewhat limply fleshy shoots reach heights of up to 23 centimeters with diameters of 4 to 8 centimeters. The very noticeable warts, up to 15 millimeters long, are conical to cylindrical. They have a delicate epidermis. The furrow on the warts only extends from the tip to half the length of the wart. Sometimes the warts bear nectar glands. The one to four (rarely six) blackish, brown or gray central spines are curved, somewhat flexible and 2.5 to 3.5 centimeters long. The nine to 15 slender, 1.6 to 2.5 centimeter long marginal spines are white to brown.

The bright pink or magenta flowers are 3 to 5 centimeters long and reach a diameter of 4.5 to 7 centimeters. Their flower bracts are ciliated. The green fruits are up to 2.5 centimeters long.

=== Subspecies ===
- Pelecyphora macromeris subsp. macromeris
- Pelecyphora macromeris subsp. runyonii (Britton & Rose) D.Aquino & Dan.Sánchez

== Distribution ==
In the United States, it occurs naturally in Texas and New Mexico. It prefers to grow in the shade under other larger plants, growing in irregular clusters or mounds. In Mexico it is found in states of Chihuahua, Coahuila, San Luis Potosí and Tamaulipas on sandy alluvial soils of the Chihuahuan Desert vegetation. In late summer, it blooms with purple or pink flowers and then bears green fruit.

== Taxonomy ==
The first description as Mammillaria macromeris by George Engelmann was published in 1848. The specific epithet macromeris is derived from the Greek words makros for 'large' and meors for 'part' and possibly refers to the large perianth of the species. Charles Lemaire placed the species in the genus Coryphantha in 1868. David Aquino & Daniel Sánchez moved the species to Pelecyphora based on phylogenetic studies in 2022. Further nomenclature synonyms are Echinocactus macromeris (Engelm.) Poselg. (1853), Cactus macromeris (Engelm.) Kuntze (1891) and Lepidocoryphantha macromeris (Engelm.) Backeb. (1942).

== Biochemistry ==
The phenethylamine macromerine is present in the cactus.
