= C9H11NO3 =

The molecular formula C_{9}H_{11}NO_{3} (molar mass: 181.18 g/mol, exact mass: 181.073893 u) may refer to:

- Adrenalone
- BOHH
- Styramate
- Tyrosine, or 4-hydroxyphenylalanine
