= Methyl-2C-B =

Methyl-2C-B, also known as methyl-4-bromo-2,5-dimethoxyphenethylamine, may refer to:

- α-Methyl-2C-B (DOB)
- β-Methyl-2C-B (BMB)
- N-Methyl-2C-B (2C-B-M)

== See also ==
- 2C (psychedelics)
- β-Methoxy-2C-B (BOB)
- Hydroxy-2C-B
- Methylmescaline
- Ten classic ladies (methyl-DOM)
