= Phenylethylamine alkaloids =

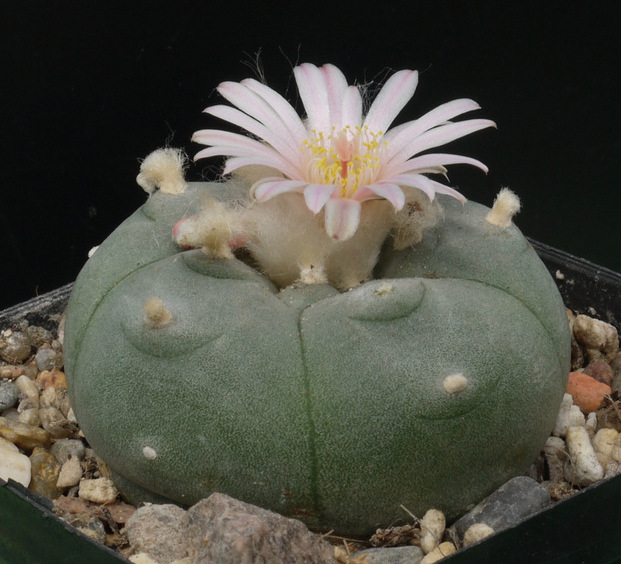
Lophophora williamsii

Phenylethylamine alkaloids are natural products with an open tetrahydroisoquinoline structure (see substituted phenethylamines.

== Occurrence ==
Phenylethylamine alkaloids occur in many plants, including members of the families Cactaceae and Leguminosae, as well as Ranunculaceae, Celastraceae, Taxaceae, Malvaceae, Papaveraceae, Poaceae, and Amaryllidaceae.

== Representatives ==
The eponym of this alkaloid group is the alkaloid phenethylamine. (-)-ephedrine is found in Ephedra vulgaris, Ephedra sinica, and other Ephedraceae species. One of the best-known representatives is mescaline from the cactus Lophophora williamsii.

== Properties ==
Phenylethylamine alkaloids are physiologically active compounds and are therefore of considerable importance. Epinephrine (adrenaline) is known as an adrenal hormone. The β-oxidized macromerine is reported to possess hallucinogenic properties. Pseudoephedrine and norephedrine are sympathomimetic substances with effects similar to those of ephedrine. Mescaline is one of the longest-known hallucinogenic substances.

(-)-Ephedrine is used as a bronchodilator for asthma attacks. It also increases blood pressure and stimulates the sympathetic nervous system. The mescaline-containing “peyote buttons” (the dried out bodies of the cactus Lophophora williamsii) are chewed to produce classical psychedelic effects.
