= BOH-2C-B =

Chemical compound

Clinical data
- Other names: BOH-2C-B-; BOHB; β-Hydroxy-4-bromo-2,5-dimethoxyphenethylamine; β-Hydroxy-2C-B; β-OH-2C-B
- Routes of administration: Oral
- Drug class: Serotonin 5-HT_{2} receptor agonist; Serotonin 5-HT_{2A} receptor agonist; Serotonergic psychedelic; Hallucinogen

Legal status
- Legal status: DE: NpSG (Industrial and scientific use only); UK: Under Psychoactive Substances Act; Illegal in Netherlands

Pharmacokinetic data
- Onset of action: Unknown
- Duration of action: Unknown

Identifiers
- IUPAC name: 2-Amino-1-(4-bromo-2,5-dimethoxyphenyl)ethan-1-ol
- CAS Number: 677277-62-2
- PubChem CID: 11370394
- ChemSpider: 9545311
- UNII: W6KJ195I24
- ChEMBL: ChEMBL191050
- CompTox Dashboard (EPA): DTXSID101342414

Chemical and physical data
- Formula: C_{10}H_{14}BrNO_{3}
- Molar mass: 276.130 g·mol^{−1}
- 3D model (JSmol): Interactive image
- SMILES: NCC(c1cc(OC)c(cc1OC)Br)O
- InChI: InChI=1S/C10H14BrNO3/c1-14-9-4-7(11)10(15-2)3-6(9)8(13)5-12/h3-4,8,13H,5,12H2,1-2H3; Key:PCSKDXWCLQXURQ-UHFFFAOYSA-N

BOH-2C-B, or BOHB, also known as 4-bromo-2,5-dimethoxy-β-hydroxyphenethylamine or as β-hydroxy-2C-B, is a psychedelic drug of the phenethylamine, 2C, and BOx families. It is the β-hydroxy derivative of 2C-B. The drug has been encountered as a novel designer drug.

== Use and effects ==
BOH-2C-B was not included or mentioned in Alexander Shulgin's book PiHKAL (Phenethylamines I Have Known and Loved). Subsequently, Daniel Trachsel listed BOHB's dose as 30 mg or more orally in his book Phenethylamine: von der Struktur zur Funktion (Phenethylamines: From Structure to Function).

== Pharmacology ==
=== Pharmacodynamics ===
BOH-2C-B acts as a serotonin 5-HT_{2A} receptor agonist.

== Chemistry ==
BOH-2C-B is a substituted phenethylamine. It features methoxy substituents at the 2- and 5-position of the ring, as well as a bromine at the 4-position. A hydroxy group is present at the beta (β) position from the functional amine group connected to the alpha (α) carbon, giving rise to its name.

=== Analogues ===
Analogues of BOH-2C-B include 2C-B, BOB (β-methoxy-2C-B), βk-2C-B (β-keto-2C-B), β-methyl-2C-B, BOHD (β-hydroxy-2C-D), and BOD (β-methoxy-2C-D), among others.

== History ==
BOH-2C-B was first described in a 2004 study by Richard Glennon and colleagues on the optimization of phenethylamine 5-HT_{2A} serotonin receptor agonists, although it is not mentioned by name. It was encountered as a novel designer drug in 2019. However, it is said to have been on the market since 2015.

== Society and culture ==
=== Legal status ===
BOH-2C-B is a controlled substance in the following countries:

- Canada: BOH-2C-B is a controlled substance under phenethylamine blanket-ban language.
- Germany: BOH-2C-B is controlled under the New Psychoactive Substances Act (NpSG) as of November 26, 2016. Possession is illegal but not penalized.
- Netherlands:: BOH-2C-B is not specifically scheduled in the NL but may be considered a ring-derived analogue of 2-phenethylamine which would make it illegal under updates made to the Dutch Opium Act in February 2024.
- United Kingdom: BOH-2C-B is illegal to produce, supply or import under the Psychoactive Substance Act as of May 26, 2016.
- United States: BOH-2C-B is unscheduled in the U.S., but may be considered an analogue of 2C-B under the Federal Analogue Act, and thus a Schedule I drug.

== See also ==
- BOx (psychedelics)
- 2C (psychedelics)
