= 2,5-DDM-DOM =

Clinical data
- Other names: 2-O-,5-O-Didesmethyl-DOM; 2,5-Didesmethyl-DOM; 2,5-DES-Me-DOM; 2,5-Dihydroxy-4-methylamphetamine; 4-Methyl-2,5-dihydroxyamphetamine; 1-(2,5-Dihydroxy-4-methylphenyl)-2-aminopropane
- Drug class: Neurotoxin
- ATC code: None

Identifiers
- IUPAC name: 2-(2-aminopropyl)-5-methylbenzene-1,4-diol
- CAS Number: 52336-50-2
- PubChem CID: 148574
- ChemSpider: 130968
- ChEMBL: ChEMBL3247439
- CompTox Dashboard (EPA): DTXSID60966719

Chemical and physical data
- Formula: C_{10}H_{15}NO_{2}
- Molar mass: 181.235 g·mol^{−1}
- 3D model (JSmol): Interactive image
- SMILES: CC1=CC(=C(C=C1O)CC(C)N)O
- InChI: InChI=1S/C10H15NO2/c1-6-3-10(13)8(4-7(2)11)5-9(6)12/h3,5,7,12-13H,4,11H2,1-2H3; Key:ISJCIACBPBDNKH-UHFFFAOYSA-N

2,5-DDM-DOM, also known as 2-O-,5-O-didesmethyl-DOM or as 2,5-dihydroxy-4-methylamphetamine, is a neurotoxin of the phenethylamine and amphetamine families related to the DOx psychedelic DOM (2,5-dimethoxy-4-methylamphetamine; STP). It is a metabolite of DOM formed by O-desmethylation, with 2-DM-DOM and 5-DM-DOM serving as metabolic intermediates. DOM might produce neurotoxicity via metabolism into 2,5-DDM-DOM followed by subsequent transformation.

== Pharmacology ==
2,5-DDM-DOM can undergo facile oxidation to form a quinone, which then cyclizes to the iminoquinone. 2,5-DDM-DOM has been found to be an alkylating agent and a potent neurotoxin similarly to 6-hydroxydopamine. 2,5-DDM-DOM and its iminoquinone have been found to produce hyperthermia in rabbits. They are both far less potent than DOM in this regard. 2,5-DDM-DOM is polar and unlikely to cross the blood–brain barrier, but its iminoquinone metabolite is highly lipophilic and has been found to readily cross the blood–brain barrier.

== Chemistry ==
The chemical synthesis of 2,5-DDM-DOM has been described. The log P of 2,5-DDM-DOM is 1.04, compared to 2.08 to 2.24 in the case of DOM. The chemical structure of 2,5-DDM-DOM is very similar to that of 6-hydroxydopamine. Various analogues of 2,5-DDM-DOM have been studied and some have also been found to be neurotoxic.

== History ==
2,5-DDM-DOM was first described in the scientific literature by 1974. Its neurotoxic properties were described in 1975. It was once hypothesized, for instance by Alexander Shulgin and others, that the hallucinogenic effects of serotonergic psychedelics like DOM might be due to formation of neurotoxic metabolites like 2,5-DDM-DOM.

== See also ==
- DOx (psychedelics)
- Monoamine neurotoxin
- 2,4,5-Trihydroxyamphetamine
