= DME (drug) =

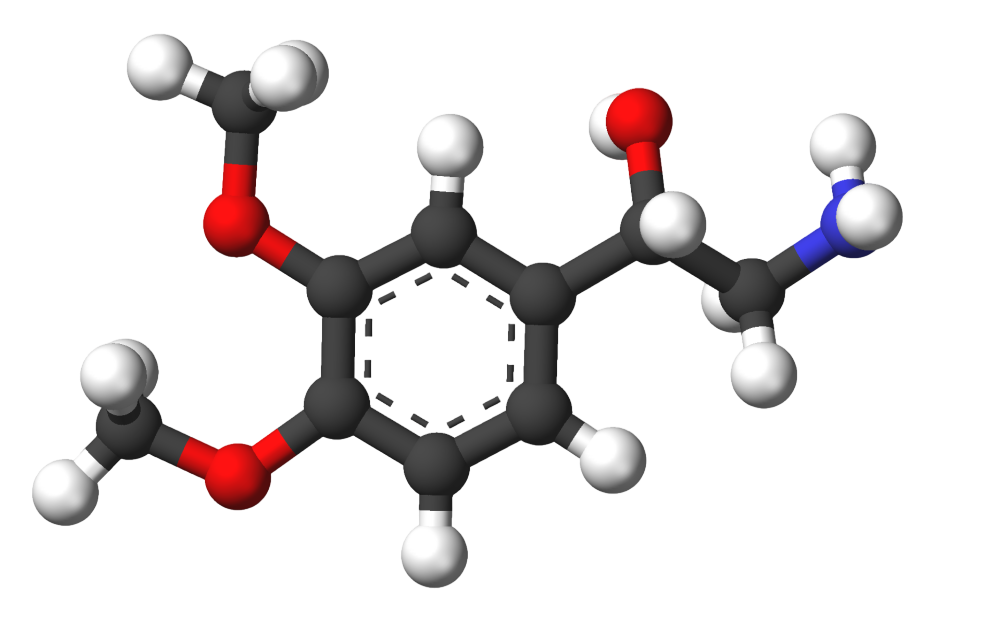

Clinical data
- Other names: Bisnormacromerine; Dinormacromerine; 3,4-Dimethoxy-β-hydroxyphenethylamine; β-Hydroxy-3,4-dimethoxyphenethylamine; β-Hydroxy-3,4-DMPEA; β-OH-3,4-DMPEA; β-Hydroxy-DMPEA; β-OH-DMPEA
- Routes of administration: Oral
- Drug class: Psychoactive drug
- ATC code: None

Pharmacokinetic data
- Duration of action: Unknown

Identifiers
- IUPAC name: 2-amino-1-(3,4-dimethoxyphenyl)ethan-1-ol
- CAS Number: 6924-15-8
- PubChem CID: 3863978
- ChemSpider: 3088871
- UNII: F9TYB6AM4W
- CompTox Dashboard (EPA): DTXSID50512380

Chemical and physical data
- Formula: C_{10}H_{15}NO_{3}
- Molar mass: 197.234 g·mol^{−1}
- 3D model (JSmol): Interactive image
- SMILES: COc1cc(ccc1OC)C(O)CN
- InChI: InChI=1S/C10H15NO3/c1-13-9-4-3-7(8(12)6-11)5-10(9)14-2/h3-5,8,12H,6,11H2,1-2H3; Key:WIUFFBGZBFVVDL-UHFFFAOYSA-N

DME, also known as bisnormacromerine or as 3,4-dimethoxy-β-hydroxyphenethylamine (β-hydroxy-3,4-DMPEA), is a psychoactive drug of the phenethylamine and BOx families. It is the β-hydroxy derivative of 3,4-dimethoxyphenethylamine (3,4-DMPEA or DMPEA), which is an analogue of mescaline (3,4,5-TMPEA or TMPEA).

== Use and effects ==
In his book PiHKAL (Phenethylamines I Have Known and Loved), Alexander Shulgin lists DME's dose as greater than 115 mg orally and its duration as unknown. At a dose of 115 mg orally, its effects included faint nausea and possible alertness, but described as "substantially no effects".

== Chemistry ==
=== Synthesis ===
The chemical synthesis of DME has been described.

=== Analogues ===
Analogues of DME (β-hydroxy-3,4-DMPEA) include BOH (β-methoxy-MDPEA) and BOM (β-methoxymescaline; β-methoxy-3,4,5-TMPEA), among others. Other analogues include normacromerine (N-methyl-DME) and macromerine (N,N-dimethyl-DME).

== History ==
DME was first described in the scientific literature by Alexander Shulgin and colleagues in 1969. It was subsequently described in greater detail by Shulgin in his 1991 book PiHKAL (Phenethylamines I Have Known and Loved).

== Society and culture ==
=== Legal status ===
==== United Kingdom ====
This substance is a Class A drug in the Drugs controlled by the UK Misuse of Drugs Act.

== See also ==
- BOx (psychedelics)
- Substituted methoxyphenethylamine
