= Medicinal Chemistry Research =

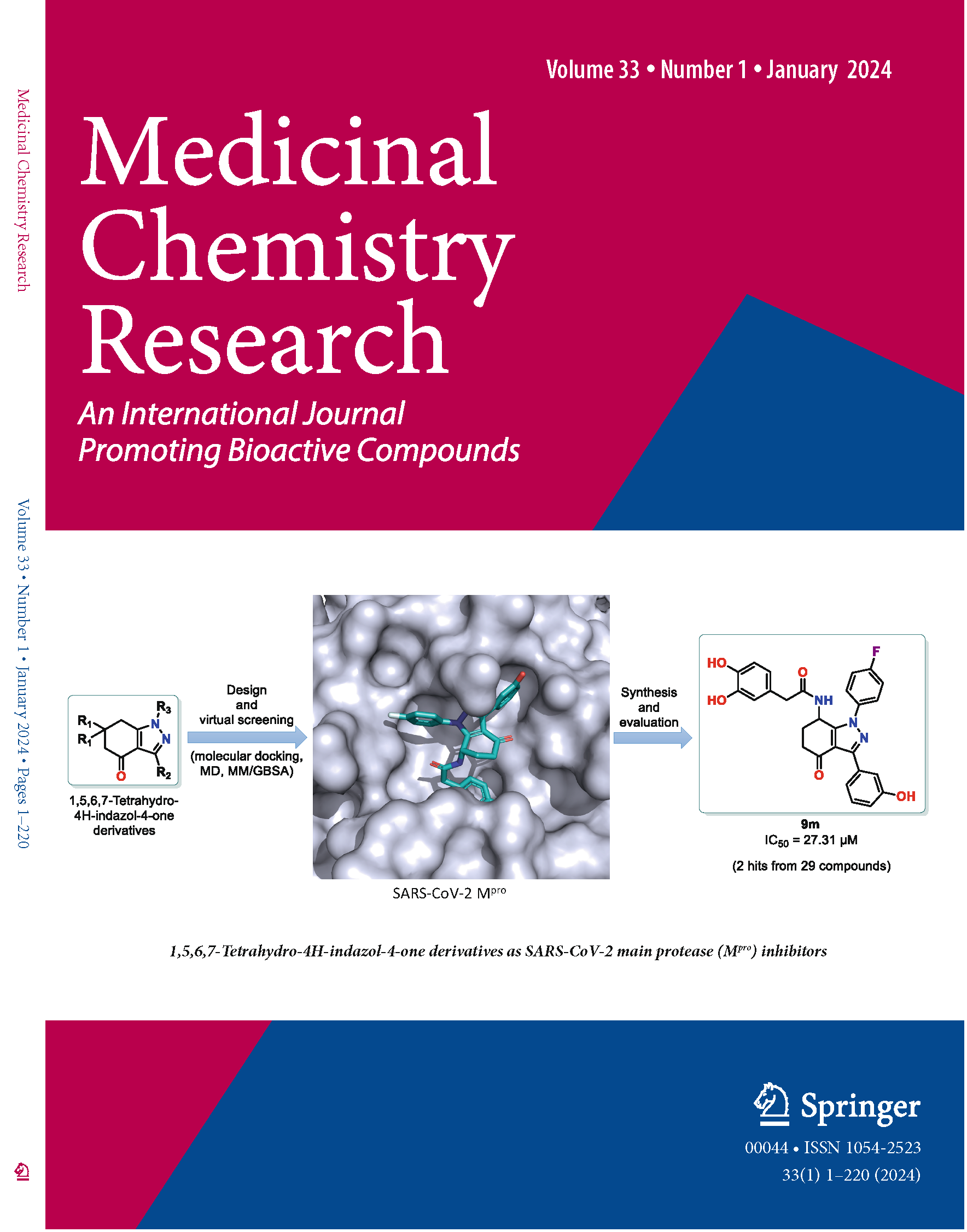
- MCR Cover
- Discipline: Medicinal Chemistry
- Language: English
- Edited by: Longqin Hu

Publication details
- History: 1991-present
- Publisher: Springer Science+Business Media
- Frequency: Monthly
- Open access: Hybrid
- Impact factor: 3.5, Q2 (2025)

Standard abbreviations
- ISO 4: Med. Chem. Res.

Indexing
- CODEN: MCREEB
- ISSN: 1054-2523 (print); 1554-8120 (web)
- OCLC no.: 57733023

Links
- Journal homepage; Online access; LinkedIn page

Medicinal Chemistry Research is a peer-reviewed scientific journal of medicinal chemistry emphasizing the structure-activity relationships of biologically active compounds. It was founded in 1991 by Alfred Burger (University of Virginia), who also founded the Journal of Medicinal Chemistry.

== Editors ==
Alfred Burger served as its first Editor-in-Chief before passing on the mantle to Richard Glennon (Virginia Commonwealth University). Stephen J. Cutler (University of South Carolina) then took over and served as the Editor-in-Chief between 2002 and 2019. Longqin Hu (Rutgers University–New Brunswick) became the current Editor-in-Chief in 2020. The current Associate Editors include Esperanza J. Carcache de Blanco (Ohio State University), Bowen Ke (West China Hospital and Sichuan University), Amol Kulkarni (University of Texas at El Paso) and Marco Pieroni (University of Parma), supported by a 50-member international editorial board.

== Scope of the journal ==
Medicinal Chemistry Research (Med Chem Res, MCR) publishes comments, review articles, brief reports, and full original research articles on a wide range of topics in medicinal chemistry, drug design, and drug discovery, many of which emphasize the structure-activity relationships of biologically active compounds. Med Chem Res is a hybrid open-access journal. There are no fees to submit or publish unless the authors choose to publish an article with color figures in print or if the authors choose to publish Open Access. For more information, please see the Instructions for Authors at https://www.springer.com/journal/44/submission-guidelines.

== Manuscript preparation and submission ==
Authors are encouraged to consult the updated Instructions to Authors at https://www.springer.com/journal/44/submission-guidelines for manuscript formatting, particularly regarding graphical abstracts and the new reference style. Figures, tables, and schemes should be embedded directly within the manuscript text, immediately following their citation, to facilitate the peer review process. It is recommended to include only essential schemes, figures, and tables, with additional figures, NMR and HRMS spectra placed in one electronic supporting document. Notably, computational modeling studies must include experimental biological validation against the targeted enzyme/protein to be published in Medicinal Chemistry Research.

Manuscripts should be submitted via Springer Nature's Article Processing Platform (SNAPP) at https://submission.springernature.com/new-submission/44/3.

== Abstracting and indexing ==
The journal is abstracted and indexed in the following bibliographic databases:

- BIOSIS
- CAB Abstracts
- Chimica
- EMBASE
- MEDLINE
- PubMed
- Science Citation Index Expanded
- Scopus
- Veterinary Science Database
- Web of Science
