= BOH (drug) =

Psychoactive drug

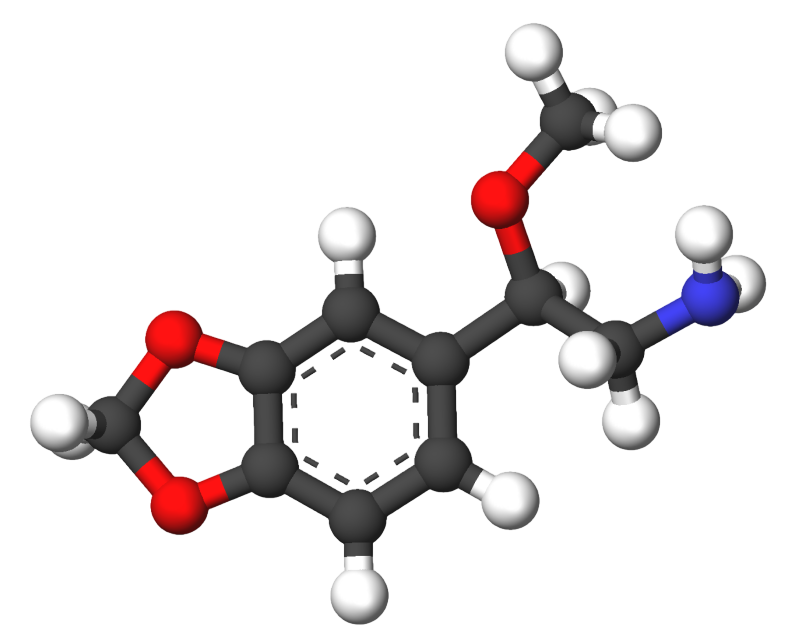

Clinical data
- Other names: β-MeO-MDPEA; β-Methoxy-MDPEA; 3,4-Methylenedioxy-β-methoxyphenethylamine
- MedlinePlus: a609035
- Routes of administration: Oral
- Drug class: Psychoactive drug
- ATC code: None

Legal status
- Legal status: US: Schedule I (isomer of MDOH); In general: uncontrolled

Pharmacokinetic data
- Duration of action: 6–8 hours

Identifiers
- IUPAC name: 2-(1,3-benzodioxol-5-yl)-2-methoxyethanamine
- CAS Number: 73304-06-0
- PubChem CID: 44719487
- ChemSpider: 21106264
- UNII: W7KI9V2RCE
- CompTox Dashboard (EPA): DTXSID10660351

Chemical and physical data
- Formula: C_{10}H_{13}NO_{3}
- Molar mass: 195.218 g·mol^{−1}
- 3D model (JSmol): Interactive image
- SMILES: NCC(OC)c1ccc2OCOc2c1
- InChI: InChI=1S/C10H13NO3/c1-12-10(5-11)7-2-3-8-9(4-7)14-6-13-8/h2-4,10H,5-6,11H2,1H3; Key:KUTKTMOZFCYDLZ-UHFFFAOYSA-N

BOH, also known as 3,4-methylenedioxy-β-methoxyphenethylamine or as β-methoxy-MDPEA, is a drug of the phenethylamine, MDxx, and BOx families. It is the β-methoxy analogue of 3,4-methylenedioxyphenethylamine (MDPEA) and is also more distantly related to methylone (β-keto-MDMA).

== Use and effects ==
In his book PiHKAL (Phenethylamines I Have Known and Loved), Alexander Shulgin lists BOH's dose range as 80 to 120 mg orally and its duration as 6 to 8 hours. The effects of BOH were reported to include distinct body awareness, a faint sense of inner warmth, mild mood enhancement, pupil dilation, skin prickling, bodily discomfort, loose bowels, decreased appetite, thirstiness, vague nausea, and cold feet. There were no clear psychedelic, entactogenic, or euphoriant effects described.

== Pharmacology ==
=== Pharmacodynamics ===
On account of its structural similarity to norepinephrine, BOH might be purely adrenergic in nature.

== Chemistry ==
=== Synthesis ===
The chemical synthesis of BOH has been described.

=== Analogues ===
Analogues of BOH (β-methoxy-MDPEA) include 3,4-methylenedioxyphenethylamine (MDPEA; homopiperonylamine), BOHH (β-hydroxy-MDPEA), 3C-BOH (α-methyl-BOH), BOB (β-methoxy-2C-B), BOD (β-methoxy-2C-D), and methylone (β-keto-MDMA), among others.

== History ==
BOH was first described in the scientific literature by Alexander Shulgin, Peyton Jacob III, and Darrell Lemaire in 1985. Subsequently, it was described in greater detail by Shulgin in his 1991 book PiHKAL (Phenethylamines I Have Known and Loved).

== Society and culture ==
=== Legal status ===
==== Canada ====
BOH is a controlled substance in Canada under phenethylamine blanket-ban language.

==== United Kingdom ====
This substance is a Class A drug in the Drugs controlled by the UK Misuse of Drugs Act.

==== United States ====
BOH is not an explicitly controlled substance in the United States. However, it could be considered a controlled substance under the Federal Analogue Act if intended for human consumption.

== See also ==
- Substituted methylenedioxyphenethylamine
- BOx (psychedelics)
