= 3C-BOH =

Clinical data
- Other names: β-Methoxy-3,4-methylenedioxyamphetamine; β-Methoxy-MDA; β-MeO-3,4-MDA; BOMDA
- Routes of administration: Oral
- Drug class: Psychoactive drug; Monoamine releasing agent; Serotonin 5-HT_{2} receptor agonist; Serotonin 5-HT_{2A} receptor agonist
- ATC code: None

Pharmacokinetic data
- Duration of action: 3–6 hours

Identifiers
- IUPAC name: 1-(1,3-benzodioxol-5-yl)-1-methoxypropan-2-amine
- PubChem CID: 121223475
- ChemSpider: 62956603

Chemical and physical data
- Formula: C_{11}H_{15}NO_{3}
- Molar mass: 209.245 g·mol^{−1}
- 3D model (JSmol): Interactive image
- SMILES: CC(C(C1=CC2=C(C=C1)OCO2)OC)N
- InChI: InChI=1S/C11H15NO3/c1-7(12)11(13-2)8-3-4-9-10(5-8)15-6-14-9/h3-5,7,11H,6,12H2,1-2H3; Key:CIORWKUPFZCTGW-UHFFFAOYSA-N

3C-BOH, also known as β-methoxy-3,4-methylenedioxyamphetamine (β-methoxy-MDA) or as BOMDA, is a psychoactive drug of the phenethylamine, amphetamine, MDxx, and BOx families related to 3,4-methylenedioxyamphetamine (MDA). It is the β-methoxy derivative of MDA and the amphetamine (α-methyl) analogue of BOH (β-methoxy-MDPEA). The drug is active at a dose of 40 to 70 mg orally with a duration of 3 to 6 hours. It is said to produce "amphetamine-like effects", as well as physical side effects and temporary body stiffness. 3C-BOH acts as a monoamine releasing agent and reuptake inhibitor, including of serotonin and norepinephrine, and additionally acts as an agonist of the serotonin 5-HT_{2} receptors, among other actions. The compound can exist as four stereoisomers, with individual assessment of each individual isomer still needed. 3C-BOH was first described in the scientific literature by Daniel Trachsel and colleagues in 2013 via personal communication with another person.

== See also ==
- Substituted methylenedioxyphenethylamine
- BOx (psychedelics)
