= BOHD (drug) =

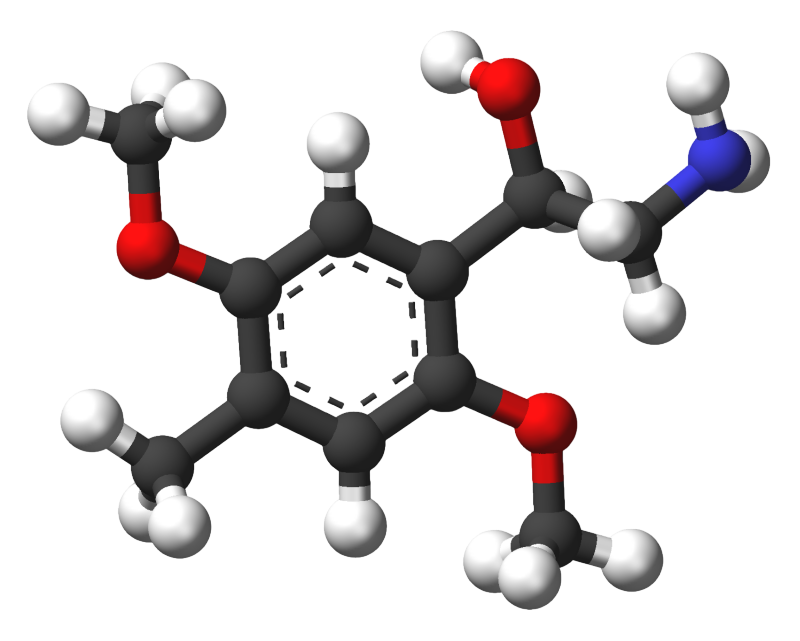

Clinical data
- Other names: 4-Methyl-2,5-dimethoxy-β-hydroxyphenethylamine; β-Hydroxy-2C-D; β-OH-2C-D
- Routes of administration: Oral
- ATC code: None

Pharmacokinetic data
- Duration of action: Unknown

Identifiers
- IUPAC name: 2-amino-1-(2,5-dimethoxy-4-methylphenyl)ethan-1-ol
- CAS Number: 29348-16-1
- PubChem CID: 44719489
- ChemSpider: 21106263
- UNII: QX20VMP285
- CompTox Dashboard (EPA): DTXSID70660352

Chemical and physical data
- Formula: C_{11}H_{17}NO_{3}
- Molar mass: 211.261 g·mol^{−1}
- 3D model (JSmol): Interactive image
- SMILES: COc1cc(C)c(cc1C(O)CN)OC
- InChI: InChI=1S/C11H17NO3/c1-7-4-11(15-3)8(9(13)6-12)5-10(7)14-2/h4-5,9,13H,6,12H2,1-3H3; Key:WCURBUJUIMRCCJ-UHFFFAOYSA-N

BOHD, also known as 4-methyl-2,5-dimethoxy-β-hydroxyphenethylamine or as β-hydroxy-2C-D, is a drug of the phenethylamine, 2C, and BOx families. It is the β-hydroxy derivative of 2C-D.

== Use and effects ==
In his book PiHKAL (Phenethylamines I Have Known and Loved), Alexander Shulgin lists BOHD's dose as greater than 50 mg orally and its duration as unknown. Its effects have been reported to include a marked drop in blood pressure without any change in heart rate, suggestive of adrenolytic toxicity. Higher doses were not explored and other effects not observed or described.

== Chemistry ==
=== Synthesis ===
The chemical synthesis of BOHD has been described.

=== Analogues ===
Analogues of BOHD include BOHB (β-hydroxy-2C-B), BOD (β-methoxy-2C-D), and BOB (β-methoxy-2C-B), among others.

== History ==
BOHD was first described in the scientific literature by Beng T. Ho and colleagues in 1970. Subsequently it was described in greater detail by Alexander Shulgin in his 1991 book PiHKAL (Phenethylamines I Have Known and Loved).

== Society and culture ==
=== Legal status ===
==== Canada ====
BOHD is a controlled substance in Canada under phenethylamine blanket-ban language.

==== United Kingdom ====
This substance is a Class A drug under the UK Misuse of Drugs Act 1971.

==== United States ====
In the United States, BOHD is a Schedule I isomer of mescaline.

== See also ==
- BOx (psychedelics)
