= Βk-2C-B =

Chemical compound

βk-2C-B

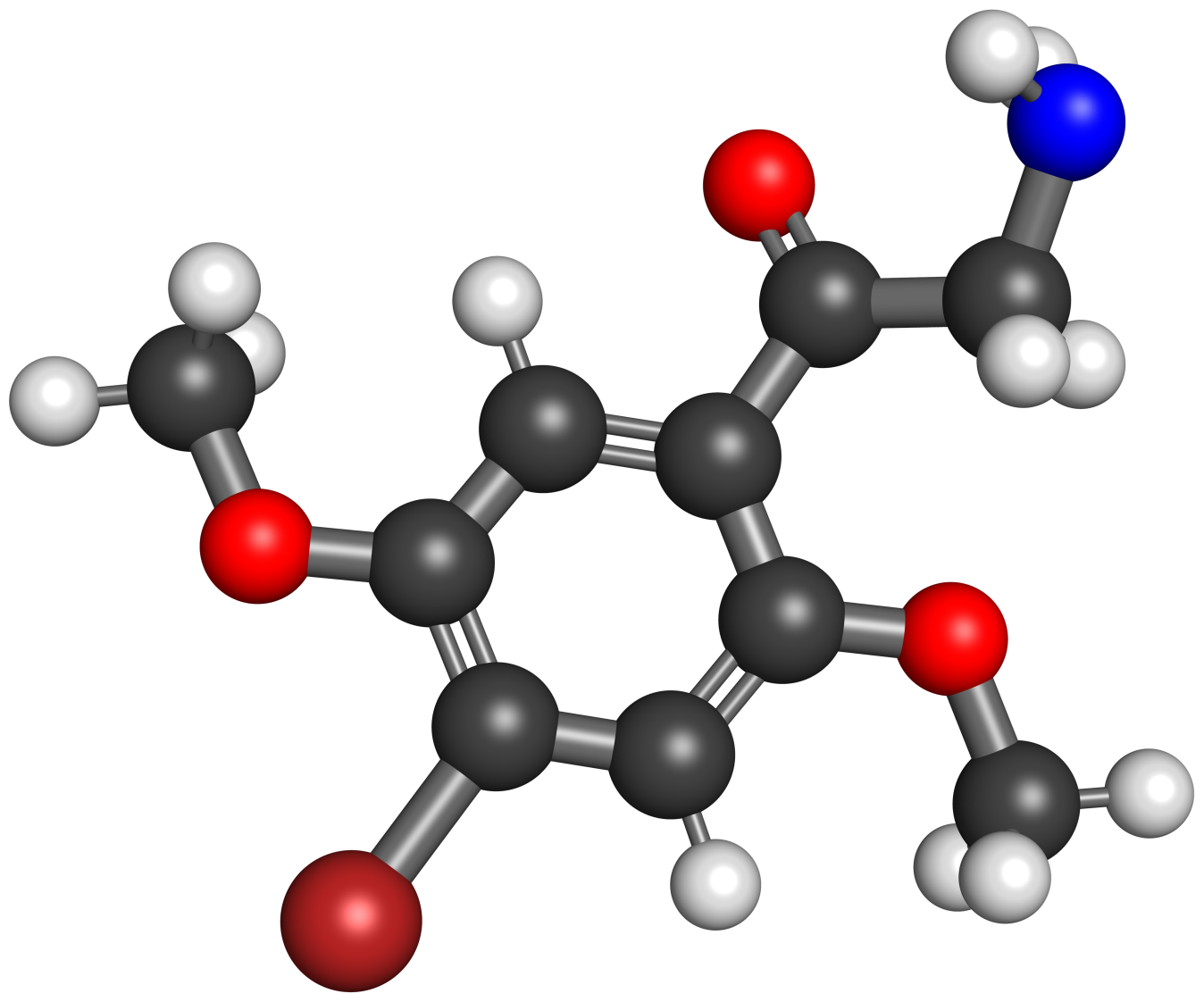

Clinical data
- Other names: β-Keto-2C-B; bk-2C-B; 4-Bromo-2,5-dimethoxy-β-ketophenethylamine; 2,5-Dimethoxy-4-bromo-β-ketophenethylamine
- Routes of administration: Oral, others
- Drug class: Serotonin receptor modulator; Serotonin 5-HT_{2A} receptor agonist; Serotonergic psychedelic; Hallucinogen

Legal status
- Legal status: CA: Schedule III; DE: NpSG (Industrial and scientific use only); UK: Under Psychoactive Substances Act; Illegal in Sweden and Switzerland

Pharmacokinetic data
- Onset of action: 20–70 minutes
- Duration of action: 10–40 hours or 10 hours

Identifiers
- IUPAC name: 2-amino-1-(4-bromo-2,5-dimethoxyphenyl)ethan-1-one
- CAS Number: 807631-09-0
- PubChem CID: 11288812
- ChemSpider: 9463799
- UNII: W6KJ195I24
- CompTox Dashboard (EPA): DTXSID201045990

Chemical and physical data
- Formula: C_{10}H_{12}BrNO_{3}
- Molar mass: 274.111 g/mol (freebase); 310.572 g/mol (HCl salt) g·mol^{−1}
- 3D model (JSmol): Interactive image
- SMILES: COC1=CC(C(=O)CN)=C(OC)C=C1Br
- InChI: InChI=1S/C10H12BrNO3/c1-14-9-4-7(11)10(15-2)3-6(9)8(13)5-12/h3-4H,5,12H2,1-2H3; Key:HFYJGAIOBIDRPX-UHFFFAOYSA-N

βk-2C-B, or bk-2C-B, also known as 4-bromo-2,5-dimethoxy-β-ketophenethylamine or as β-keto-2C-B, is a psychedelic drug of the phenethylamine and 2C family. It is the β-keto derivative of 2C-B. The drug is taken orally.

The drug acts as a very-low-potency serotonin 5-HT_{2A} receptor agonist.

βk-2C-B was first described in the scientific literature by Richard Glennon and colleagues in 2004. It was first encountered as a novel designer drug in Europe in 2013. The drug has since become a controlled substance in Canada, Germany, Switzerland, and the United Kingdom.

== Use and effects ==
βk-2C-B was not included nor mentioned in Alexander Shulgin's book PiHKAL (Phenethylamines I Have Known and Loved). However, it subsequently emerged as a novel recreational designer drug and its properties and effects were reported. βk-2C-B is usually taken orally, but may also be used by other routes. Insufflation is said to be not well-tolerated. The drug has been said to be used at doses of 150 to 1,000 mg orally. Its onset is said to be 20 to 70 minutes and its duration is said to be long at 10 to 40 hours. However, other sources have reported a dose range of 50 to 150 mg or more orally, an onset of 30 minutes, and a duration of 10 hours. The effects of βk-2C-B have been said to include euphoria, psychedelic visuals, entactogenic effects, and sensory enhancement, among others.

== Pharmacology ==
=== Pharmacodynamics ===
βk-2C-B acts as a very-low-potency serotonin 5-HT_{2A} receptor partial agonist. Its EC_{50} was found to be 905 nM and its E_{max} was 41%. For comparison, 2C-B had an EC_{50} of 9.0 nM and an E_{max} of 89% in the same study. In another study, βk-2C-B's EC_{50} at the serotonin 5-HT_{2A} receptor was 6,732 nM, compared to 0.28 nM in the case of 2C-I and 0.78 nM in the case of 2C-E (2C-B was not reported).

The interactions of βk-2C-B with monoamine oxidase (MAO) enzymes have been studied. Weak inhibition caused by βk-2C-B is evident at an IC_{50} of 14,000 nM for MAO-B whereas for MAO-A inhibition was undetectable.

== Chemistry ==
βk-2C-B, also known as 4-bromo-2,5-dimethoxy-β-ketophenethylamine, is a substituted phenethylamine of the 2C family. It is the β-keto derivative of 2C-B.

=== Synthesis ===
The chemical synthesis of βk-2C-B has been described.

=== Decomposition ===
The thermal decomposition of βk-2C-B has been studied using a simulated 'meth pipe' scenario. Twelve major pyrolysis products were found for the thermally-induced decomposition of βk-2C-B.

=== Analogues ===
Analogues of βk-2C-B include 2C-B, β-methyl-2C-B (BMB), BOB (β-methoxy-2C-B), BOH-2C-B (BOHB; β-hydroxy-2C-B), and βk-DOB, among others.

== History ==
βk-2C-B was first described in the scientific literature by Richard Glennon and colleagues in 2004. It was first encountered as a novel designer drug in Europe in 2013. In the years after its emergence on the market, papers reporting analytical characterizations of the substance appeared. Since October 2016, βk-2C-B has been a controlled substance in Canada. It is also illegal in Germany, Switzerland, and the United Kingdom.

== Society and culture ==
=== Legal status ===
βk-2C-B is a controlled substance in the following countries:

- Canada: βk-2C-B is a Schedule III controlled substance as of October 12, 2016.
- Germany: βk-2C-B is controlled under the New Psychoactive Substances Act (NpSG) as of November 26, 2016. Possession is illegal but not penalized.
- Sweden: βk-2C-B was classified as a narcotic on April 5, 2019.
- Switzerland: βk-2C-B is a controlled substance specifically named under Verzeichnis E.,
- United Kingdom: βk-2C-B is illegal to produce, supply or import under the Psychoactive Substance Act as of May 26, 2016.
- United States: βk-2C-B is unscheduled in the U.S., but may be considered an analogue of 2C-B under the Federal Analogue Act, and thus a Schedule I drug if intended for human consumption.

== See also ==
- BOx (psychedelics)
