= 4-O-Desmethylmescaline =

Clinical data
- Other names: 4-O-Desmethylmescaline; 4-Desmethylmescaline; 4-Hydroxymescaline; 4-OH-3,5-DMPEA; 3,5-Dimethoxy-4-hydroxyphenethylamine; 4-Hydroxy-3,5-dimethoxyphenethylamine; 3,5-Dimethoxytyramine; DESMETHYL; NSC-167759; NSC-167759
- ATC code: None

Identifiers
- IUPAC name: 4-(2-aminoethyl)-2,6-dimethoxyphenol
- CAS Number: 2413-00-5
- PubChem CID: 533955
- ChemSpider: 465214
- ChEMBL: ChEMBL4532448
- CompTox Dashboard (EPA): DTXSID70336469

Chemical and physical data
- Formula: C_{10}H_{15}NO_{3}
- Molar mass: 197.234 g·mol^{−1}
- 3D model (JSmol): Interactive image
- SMILES: COC1=CC(=CC(=C1O)OC)CCN
- InChI: InChI=1S/C10H15NO3/c1-13-8-5-7(3-4-11)6-9(14-2)10(8)12/h5-6,12H,3-4,11H2,1-2H3; Key:ISVPPMXWQFCRSS-UHFFFAOYSA-N

4-O-Desmethylmescaline, also known as 3,5-dimethoxy-4-hydroxyphenethylamine, 4-hydroxymescaline, 3,5-dimethoxytyramine, or DESMETHYL, is an alkaloid and drug of the phenethylamine and scaline families related to mescaline. It is the analogue of mescaline in which the methyl ether at the 4-position hydroxyl group has been removed.

The compound occurs naturally in various cacti species, for instance those of the genera Lophophora, Trichocereus, Opuntia, and Stenocereus, among others. It also occurs in certain Acacia species. 4-O-Desmethylmescaline may be a biosynthetic precursor of mescaline in cacti and is known to be a minor metabolite of mescaline.

It is known to be pharmacologically active in cats, including producing catatonia and a hypokinetic rigid syndrome similarly to large doses of mescaline. According to Alexander Shulgin, the effects of 4-O-desmethylmescaline in humans are unknown, and it is unclear whether it might have psychedelic effects similarly to mescaline. However, according to John Raymond Smythies, 4-O-desmethylmescaline has no hallucinogenic activity, although this conclusion was based on the Winter and Flataker rope-climbing test in rats (where mescaline is active, 3,4-dimethoxyphenethylamine is 50% as active as mescaline, and 4-O-desmethylmescaline is completely inactive), rather than on tests in humans.

4-O-Desmethylmescaline was first described in the scientific literature by F. Benington and colleagues in 1954. It is not a controlled substance in Canada as of 2025.

== See also ==
- Scaline
- 3-O-Desmethylmescaline
- 4-O-,5-O-Didesmethylmescaline
- 2-DM-DOM and 5-DM-DOM
