= Macromerine =

Names
- IUPAC name (R)-1-(3,4-Dimethoxyphenyl)-2-(dimethylamino)ethanol
- Other names β-Hydroxy-3,4-dimethoxy-N,N-dimethylphenethylamine; β-Hydroxy-N,N-dimethyl-DMPEA; N,N-Dimethyl-DME; N,N-Me-DME

Identifiers
CAS Number	2970-95-8
3D model (JSmol)	Interactive image
ChemSpider	144706
PubChem CID	165055
UNII	I2097PW32Q
CompTox Dashboard (EPA)	DTXSID70894756
- InChI: InChI=1S/C12H19NO3/c1-13(2)8-10(14)9-5-6-11(15-3)12(7-9)16-4/h5-7,10,14H,8H2,1-4H3 Key: YAIPYAQVBZPSSC-UHFFFAOYSA-N; InChI=1/C12H19NO3/c1-13(2)8-10(14)9-5-6-11(15-3)12(7-9)16-4/h5-7,10,14H,8H2,1-4H3
- SMILES: O(c1ccc(cc1OC)C(O)CN(C)C)C

Properties
Chemical formula	C_{12}H_{19}NO_{3}
Molar mass	225.288 g·mol^{−1}
- Except where otherwise noted, data are given for materials in their standard state (at 25 °C [77 °F], 100 kPa). verify (what is ?) Infobox references

Macromerine, also known as β-hydroxy-3,4-dimethoxy-N,N-dimethylphenethylamine, is a phenethylamine derivative.

It was first identified from cacti of the genus Pelecyphora.

At least one study found macromerine to be non-psychoactive.

== See also ==
- Psychoactive cactus
- Mescaline
- Trichocereine
- DME (β-hydroxy-3,4-DMPEA)
- BOH-2C-B
