= Βk-DOB =

βk-DOB

Clinical data
- Other names: DOB-βk; 4-Bromo-2,5-dimethoxy-β-ketoamphetamine; 4-Bromo-2,5-dimethoxycathinone; 4′-Bromo-2′,5′-dimethoxy-2-aminopropanophenone; 2,5MeO,4Br-C
- Routes of administration: Oral
- Drug class: Psychedelic drug; Hallucinogen
- ATC code: None

Pharmacokinetic data
- Duration of action: 6–8 hours

Identifiers
- IUPAC name: 2-amino-1-(4-bromo-2,5-dimethoxyphenyl)propan-1-one
- PubChem CID: 82647727
- ChemSpider: 27749706

Chemical and physical data
- Formula: C_{11}H_{14}BrNO_{3}
- Molar mass: 288.141 g·mol^{−1}
- 3D model (JSmol): Interactive image
- SMILES: CC(C(=O)C1=CC(=C(C=C1OC)Br)OC)N
- InChI: InChI=1S/C11H14BrNO3/c1-6(13)11(14)7-4-10(16-3)8(12)5-9(7)15-2/h4-6H,13H2,1-3H3; Key:NFDUSHHXFRLENI-UHFFFAOYSA-N

βk-DOB, or DOB-βk, also known as 4-bromo-2,5-dimethoxy-β-ketoamphetamine or as 4-bromo-2,5-dimethoxycathinone, is a psychedelic drug of the phenethylamine, amphetamine, DOx, and cathinone families related to DOB and βk-2C-B. It is the β-keto or cathinone derivative of DOB and the α-methyl or amphetamine derivative of βk-2C-B (which itself is the β-keto derivative of 2C-B).

According to Alexander Shulgin in his book The Shulgin Index, Volume One: Psychedelic Phenethylamines and Related Compounds, citing personal communication with an individual named Igor in 2006, βk-DOB is active at a dose of 20 mg orally and has a duration of 6 to 8 hours. It is said to produce similar effects as DOB, and hence would appear to produce psychedelic effects. However, compared to DOB, it is much less potent (with DOB having a dose of 1–3 mg orally) and has a much shorter duration (with DOB having a duration of 18–36 hours).

Some analogues of βk-DOB that have been described include β-MeO-DOB (β-methoxy-DOB; 3C-BOB; AL-37662) and β-HO-DOB (β-hydroxy-DOB; 3C-BOHB).

βk-DOB was first described in the scientific literature by Shulgin in 2011. Aside from Shulgin's description, the drug is said to not otherwise be present in the published literature.

== See also ==
- DOx (psychedelics)
- Substituted cathinone
