= Dimetofrine =

Chemical compound

Clinical data
- Trade names: Dovida, Pressamina, Superten
- Other names: Dimethophrine; Dimetrophine; Dimethofrine; DMP; SM-14; 3,5-Dimethoxy-4,β-dihydroxy-N-methylphenethylamine; β-Hydroxy-N-methyl-4-O-desmethylmescaline
- Routes of administration: Oral
- Drug class: α_{1}-Adrenergic receptor agonist; Antihypotensive agent; Vasopressor
- ATC code: C01CA12 (WHO)

Identifiers
- IUPAC name: (RS)-4-[1-Hydroxy-2-(methylamino)ethyl]-2,6-dimethoxyphenol
- CAS Number: 22950-29-4
- PubChem CID: 31513
- DrugBank: DB13494
- ChemSpider: 29227
- UNII: BOM1J10QQM
- KEGG: D07149
- ChEBI: CHEBI:134932
- ChEMBL: ChEMBL2105040
- CompTox Dashboard (EPA): DTXSID60865076
- ECHA InfoCard: 100.041.210

Chemical and physical data
- Formula: C_{11}H_{17}NO_{4}
- Molar mass: 227.260 g·mol^{−1}
- 3D model (JSmol): Interactive image
- SMILES: O(c1cc(cc(OC)c1O)C(O)CNC)C
- InChI: InChI=1S/C11H17NO4/c1-12-6-8(13)7-4-9(15-2)11(14)10(5-7)16-3/h4-5,8,12-14H,6H2,1-3H3; Key:ZKGDBJAHIIXDDW-UHFFFAOYSA-N

Dimetofrine (INN), also known as dimethophrine or dimetophrine and sold under the brand names Dovida, Pressamina, and Superten, is a medication described as a sympathomimetic, vasoconstrictor, and cardiac stimulant. It is said to be similarly or less effective than midodrine in the treatment of orthostatic hypotension and shows substantially lower potency.

The drug is a selective α_{1}-adrenergic receptor agonist but is also said to have β-adrenergic receptor agonist activity. It is a substituted phenethylamine and is also known as 3,5-dimethoxy-4,β-dihydroxy-N-methylphenethylamine. Its chemical structure is similar to that of desglymidodrine (2,5-dimethoxy-β-hydroxyphenethylamine), the active metabolite of midodrine.

Dimetofrine remained marketed only in Italy in 2000.

== See also ==
- Substituted phenethylamine
- β-Hydroxymescaline
