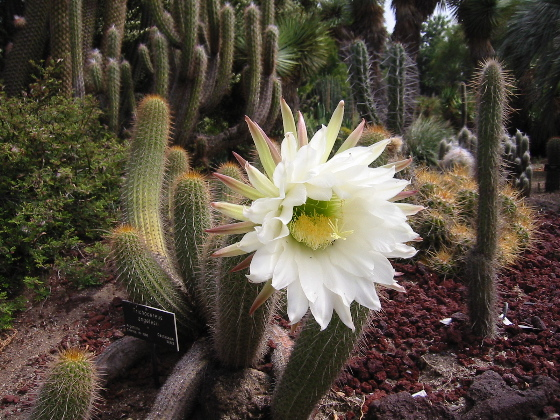
- Flower

Scientific classification
- Kingdom: Plantae
- Clade: Tracheophytes
- Clade: Angiosperms
- Clade: Eudicots
- Order: Caryophyllales
- Family: Cactaceae
- Subfamily: Cactoideae
- Genus: Echinopsis
- Species: E. spachiana

Binomial name
- Echinopsis spachiana (Lem.) H.Friedrich & G.D.Rowley

Synonyms
- Cereus santiaguensis Speg.; Cereus spachianus Lem.; Echinopsis santiaguensis (Speg.) H.Friedrich & G.D.Rowley; Soehrensia spachiana (Lem.) Schlumpb.; Trichocereus santiaguensis (Speg.) Backeb.; Trichocereus spachianus (Lem.) Riccob.

= Echinopsis spachiana =

Species of cactus

Echinopsis spachiana, synonyms including Soehrensia spachiana and Trichocereus spachianus, commonly known as the golden torch, (white) torch cactus or golden column, is a species of cactus native to South America. It is commonly cultivated as a pot or rockery plant worldwide. It has a columnar habit, with a lime-green cylindrical body with 1–2 cm (0.4–0.8 in) long golden spines.

== Description ==
Echinopsis spachiana grows as a cactus with a columnar habit, reaching 2 m (7 ft) high, with a diameter of 5–6 cm (2–2 1/4 in). Vertical branches arise from the base of the plant. Each column has 10–15 rounded ribs. The large areoles are around 1 cm apart, and have wavy yellow hairs. The straight spines are red-yellow initially, fading to white as they age. The central spine is around 1–2 cm (1/2–3/4 in) long, and is surrounded by 8 to 10 smaller radial spines that are 0.4–1 cm (1/4–1/2 in) in length. The white flowers are 15 cm (6 in) across and 18–20 cm (7–7 3/4 in) long, part of which is an 8 cm long tube. In the northern hemisphere, the flowers appear in June–July and open at night.

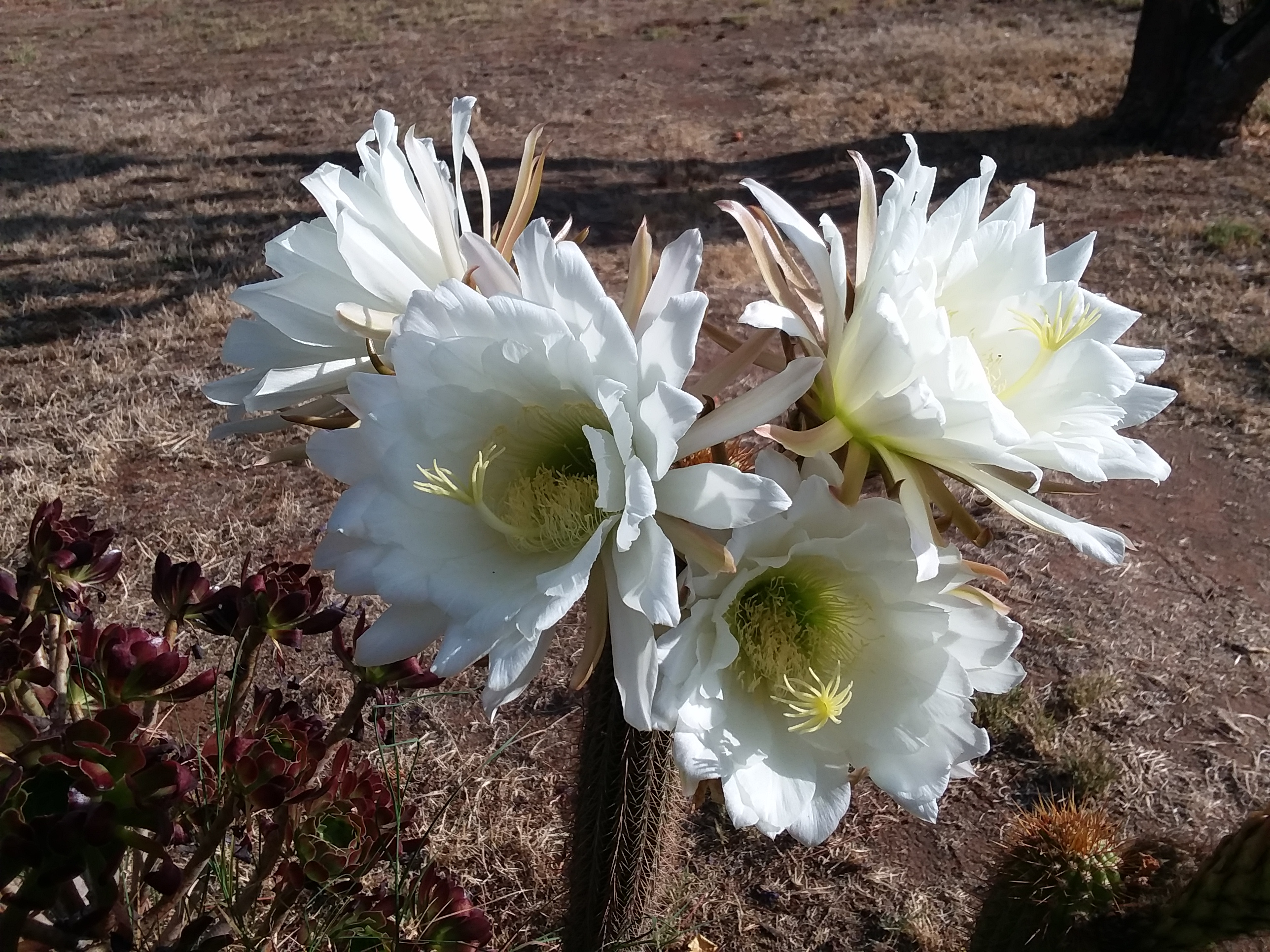
Flowers blooming

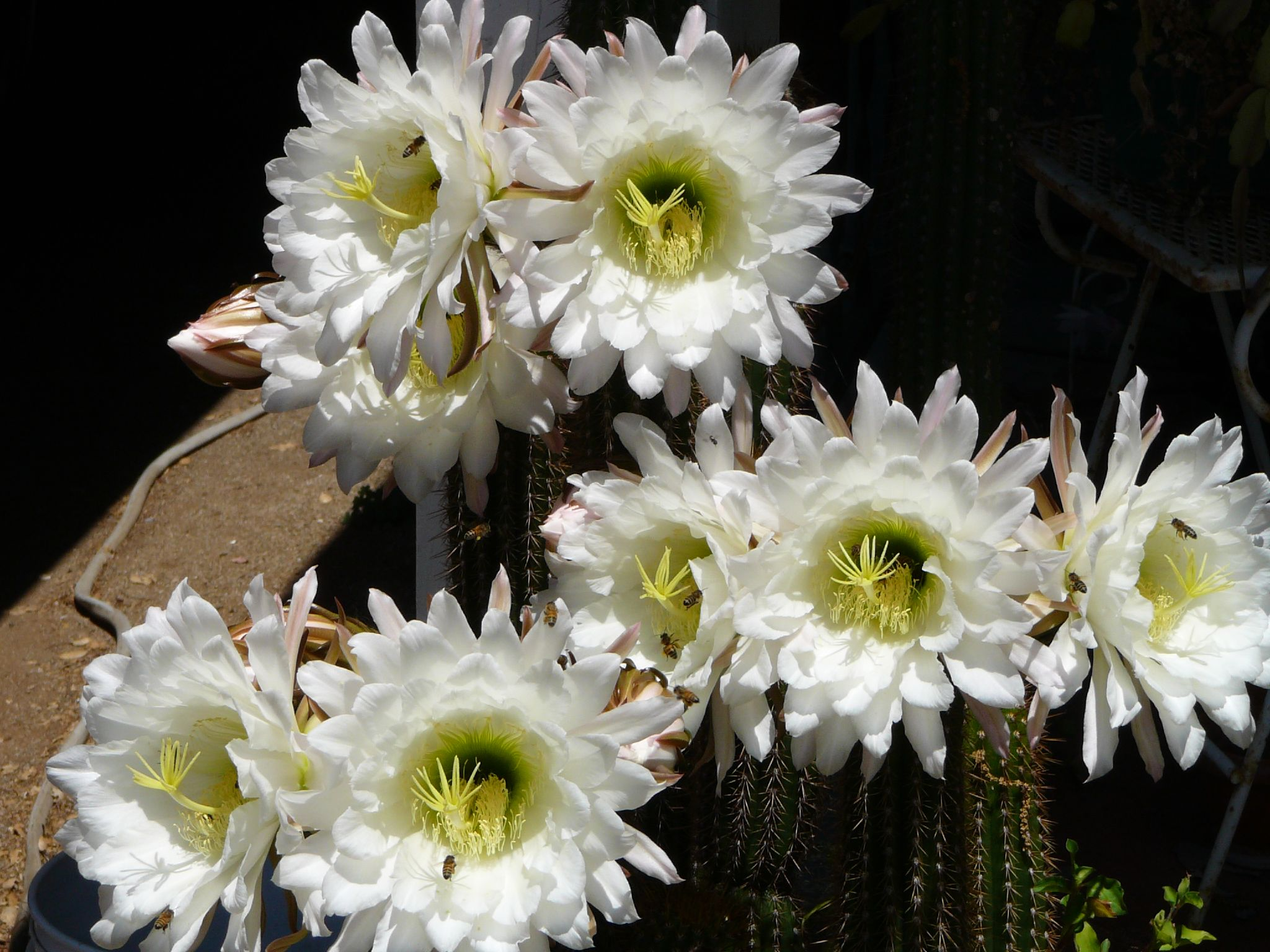
Flowers blooming

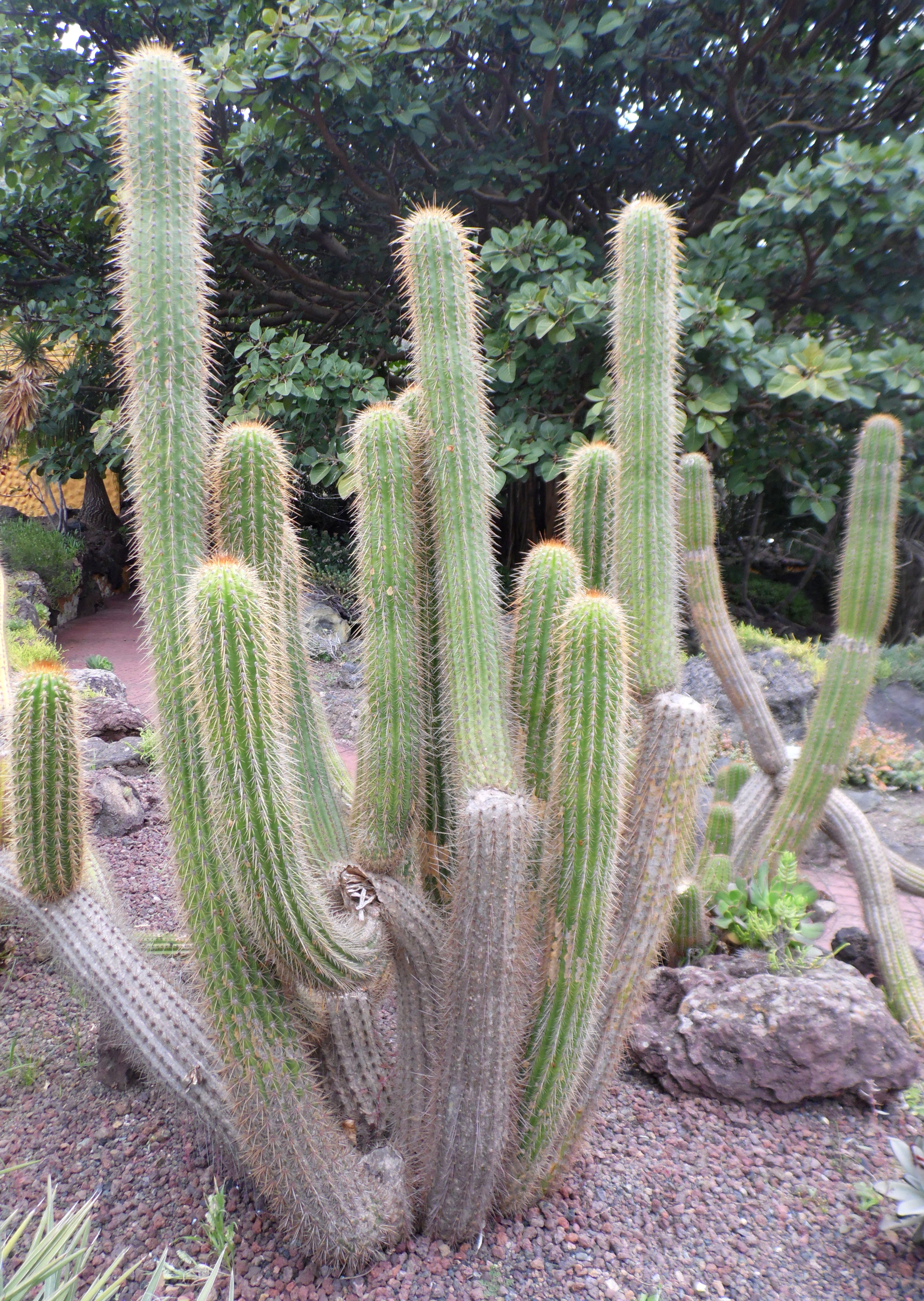
Plant

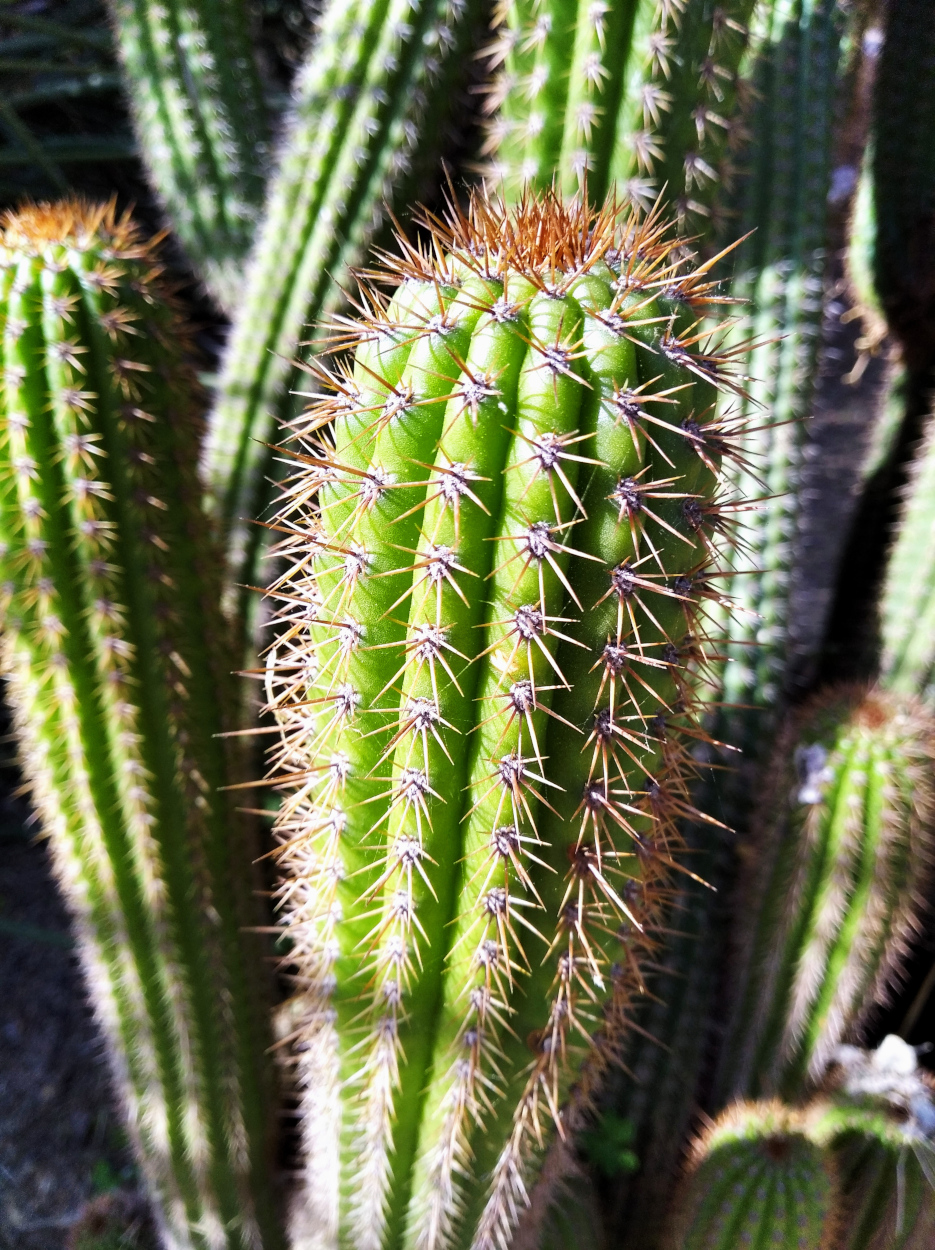
Close up to spines

== Taxonomy ==
French botanist Charles Antoine Lemaire described the species as Cereus spachianus in 1839, in honour of his countryman Édouard Spach. The type specimen was collected in Argentina, though where in the country is unclear. Alwin Berger erected the subgenus Trichocereus in 1905, incorporating this species. Vincenzo Riccobono elevated Trichocereus to genus status in 1909, and hence it was for many years known as Trichocereus spachianus. The genus encompassed a number of columnar cacti, before being subsumed into Echinopsis. A 2012 genetic analysis of chloroplast DNA indicates Echinopsis is made up of several divergent lineages. E. spachiana was not included in the study but is thought to be related to a Helianthocereus clade. As of February 2026, Plants of the World Online placed it in the genus Echinopsis.

== Distribution and habitat ==
Echinopsis spachiana is native to northwestern Argentina around Icaño and Santiago del Estero province and Bolivia. It has been introduced elsewhere, including Mexico, the Canary Islands, and Spain, and is a declared weed in South Africa.
