= 3-O-Desmethylmescaline =

Clinical data
- Other names: 3,4-Dimethoxy-5-hydroxyphenethylamine; 3-Hydroxy-4,5-dimethoxyphenethylamine; 3-Desmethylmescaline
- ATC code: None

Identifiers
- IUPAC name: 5-(2-aminoethyl)-2,3-dimethoxyphenol
- CAS Number: 16046-07-4
- PubChem CID: 44559361
- ChemSpider: 25038773
- ChEMBL: ChEMBL1187491
- CompTox Dashboard (EPA): DTXSID50659481

Chemical and physical data
- Formula: C_{10}H_{15}NO_{3}
- Molar mass: 197.234 g·mol^{−1}
- 3D model (JSmol): Interactive image
- SMILES: COC1=CC(=CC(=C1OC)O)CCN
- InChI: InChI=1S/C10H15NO3/c1-13-9-6-7(3-4-11)5-8(12)10(9)14-2/h5-6,12H,3-4,11H2,1-2H3; Key:PDKPJPTZKPCMKR-UHFFFAOYSA-N

3-O-Desmethylmescaline, also known as 3-hydroxy-4,5-dimethoxyphenethylamine or 3-DESMETHYL, is an alkaloid of the phenethylamine and scaline families related to mescaline. It is the analogue of mescaline in which the methyl ether at the 3-position hydroxyl group has been removed.

The compound occurs naturally in various cacti species, for instance those of the genera Lophophora and Trichocereus, among others. It also occurs in certain Acacia species. 3-O-Desmethylmescaline may be a biosynthetic precursor of mescaline in cacti and is also known to be a minor metabolite of mescaline. The compound is a biosynthetic precursor of several mescaline-related tetrahydroisoquinolines found in cacti as well, for instance anhalamine and anhalonidine.

The pharmacology of 3-O-desmethylmescaline is unknown. In addition, according to Alexander Shulgin, the effects of 3-O-desmethylmescaline in humans are unknown, and it is unclear whether it might have psychedelic effects in humans similarly to mescaline.

It is not a controlled substance in Canada as of 2025.

== See also ==
- Scaline
- 4-O-Desmethylmescaline
- 4-O-,5-O-Didesmethylmescaline
- 2-DM-DOM and 5-DM-DOM
