= BOHH =

Clinical data
- Other names: 3,4-Methylenedioxy-β-hydroxyphenethylamine; β-Hydroxy-3,4-methylenedioxyphenethylamine; β-Hydroxy-MDPEA; Methylenedioxyethanolamine; MDE
- Routes of administration: Oral
- ATC code: None

Pharmacokinetic data
- Duration of action: Unknown

Identifiers
- IUPAC name: 2-amino-1-(1,3-benzodioxol-5-yl)ethanol
- CAS Number: 7464-97-3
- PubChem CID: 343688
- ChemSpider: 304688

Chemical and physical data
- Formula: C_{9}H_{11}NO_{3}
- Molar mass: 181.191 g·mol^{−1}
- 3D model (JSmol): Interactive image
- SMILES: C1OC2=C(O1)C=C(C=C2)C(CN)O
- InChI: InChI=1S/C9H11NO3/c10-4-7(11)6-1-2-8-9(3-6)13-5-12-8/h1-3,7,11H,4-5,10H2; Key:NFDJYUZZSPJWLV-UHFFFAOYSA-N

BOHH, also known as 3,4-methylenedioxy-β-hydroxyphenethylamine or as β-hydroxy-MDPEA, is a chemical compound of the phenethylamine, MDxx, and BOx families related to 3,4-methylenedioxyphenethylamine (MDPEA). It is the β-hydroxy derivative of MDPEA and the β-O-desmethyl analogue of BOH (β-methoxy-MDPEA). The drug is also the 3,4-methylenedioxy analogue of the neurotransmitter norepinephrine.

According to Alexander Shulgin in his book Phenethylamines I Have Known and Loved (PiHKAL) and other publications, BOHH is inactive at doses of up to 100 mg orally. On the other hand, Michael Valentine Smith claimed in his book Psychedelic Chemistry that BOHH "is said to be a very fine trip", with no other information provided.

BOHH was first described in the scientific literature by at least 1981. Subsequently, it was described in greater detail by Shulgin in PiHKAL in 1991.

== See also ==
- Substituted methylenedioxyphenethylamine
- BOx (psychedelics)
