= Β-Hydroxymescaline =

β-Hydroxymescaline

Clinical data
- Other names: Mescalol; β-Hydroxy-3,4,5-trimethoxyphenethylamine; β-HOM
- Drug class: Psychoactive drug
- ATC code: None

Identifiers
- IUPAC name: 2-amino-1-(3,4,5-trimethoxyphenyl)ethanol
- CAS Number: 13079-18-0
- PubChem CID: 28894
- ChemSpider: 26875
- ChEBI: CHEBI:125361

Chemical and physical data
- Formula: C_{11}H_{17}NO_{4}
- Molar mass: 227.260 g·mol^{−1}
- 3D model (JSmol): Interactive image
- SMILES: COC1=CC(=CC(=C1OC)OC)C(CN)O
- InChI: InChI=1S/C11H17NO4/c1-14-9-4-7(8(13)6-12)5-10(15-2)11(9)16-3/h4-5,8,13H,6,12H2,1-3H3; Key:BHURFCFBOPXSCN-UHFFFAOYSA-N

β-Hydroxymescaline (β-HOM), also known as mescalol or as β-hydroxy-3,4,5-trimethoxyphenethylamine, is a psychoactive drug and alkaloid of the phenethylamine, scaline, and BOx families related to the psychedelic drug mescaline. It has been reported to be naturally occurring in the Pereskia grandiflora cactus. The drug may also be a minor metabolite of mescaline formed by dopamine β-hydroxylase (DBH).

It is not known to have been tested in humans.

The drug is behaviorally active in the conditioned avoidance response (CAR) test in animals similarly to mescaline, but was 7-fold less potent than mescaline. Due to its hydroxyl group and reduced lipophilicity, β-hydroxymescaline shows lower blood–brain barrier penetration than mescaline and is more peripherally selective. Other biological effects of β-hydroxymescaline have also been reported.

The chemical synthesis of β-hydroxymescaline has been described.

β-Hydroxymescaline was first described in the scientific literature by 1944.

== See also ==
- Scaline
- BOx (psychedelics)
- β-Methoxymescaline (BOM)
- Dimetofrine
