= Desglymidodrine =

Antihypotensive agent active metabolite

Clinical data
- Other names: Deglymidodrine; ST-1059; 2,5-Dimethoxy-β-hydroxyphenethylamine; β-Hydroxy-2C-H
- Drug class: α_{1}-Adrenergic receptor agonist; Antihypotensive agent; Vasopressor

Pharmacokinetic data
- Elimination half-life: 2–4 hours

Identifiers
- IUPAC name: 2-amino-1-(2,5-dimethoxyphenyl)ethanol
- CAS Number: 3600-87-1
- PubChem CID: 43260
- DrugBank: DBMET00829
- ChemSpider: 39427
- UNII: S57K35I2FV
- KEGG: C21521
- ChEBI: CHEBI:73248
- ChEMBL: ChEMBL1076
- CompTox Dashboard (EPA): DTXSID00957424
- ECHA InfoCard: 100.322.299

Chemical and physical data
- Formula: C_{10}H_{15}NO_{3}
- Molar mass: 197.234 g·mol^{−1}
- 3D model (JSmol): Interactive image
- SMILES: COC1=CC(=C(C=C1)OC)C(CN)O
- InChI: InChI=1S/C10H15NO3/c1-13-7-3-4-10(14-2)8(5-7)9(12)6-11/h3-5,9,12H,6,11H2,1-2H3; Key:VFRCNXKYZVQYLX-UHFFFAOYSA-N

Desglymidodrine (developmental code name ST-1059) is the active metabolite of the prodrug antihypotensive agent midodrine. It acts as a selective α_{1}-adrenergic receptor agonist. Desglymidodrine is formed from midodrine via deglycination.

== Pharmacology ==
=== Pharmacokinetics ===
The elimination half-life of desglymidodrine is 2 to 4 hours.

== Chemistry ==
Desglymidodrine, also known as 2,5-dimethoxy-β-hydroxyphenethylamine or as β-hydroxy-2C-H, is a substituted phenethylamine and BOx derivative.

Midodrine's experimental log P is -0.5 and its predicted log P ranges from -0.49 to -0.95. The predicted log P of desglymidodrine ranges from -0.01 to 0.15.

== See also ==
- Substituted phenethylamine
- Dimetofrine
- 2C-H
- List of investigational orthostatic intolerance drugs
