= BOB (psychedelic) =

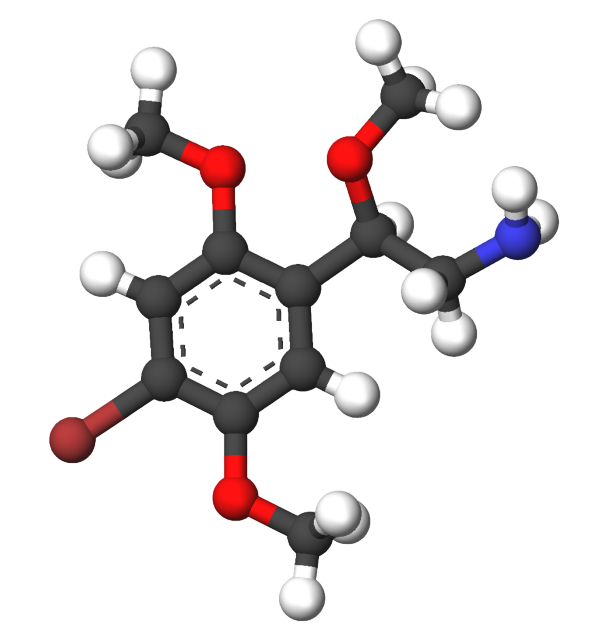

Clinical data
- Other names: β-Methoxy-2C-B; 4-Bromo-2,5,β-trimethoxyphenethylamine; β-MeO-2C-D
- Routes of administration: Oral
- Drug class: Serotonin receptor modulator; Serotonin 5-HT_{2A} receptor agonist; Serotonergic psychedelic; Hallucinogen
- ATC code: None

Pharmacokinetic data
- Duration of action: 10–20 hours

Identifiers
- IUPAC name: 2-(4-bromo-2,5-dimethoxyphenyl)-2-methoxyethan-1-amine
- CAS Number: 98537-42-9
- PubChem CID: 15185771
- ChemSpider: 21106261
- UNII: 89A0HNR42S
- ChEMBL: ChEMBL191051
- CompTox Dashboard (EPA): DTXSID60569805

Chemical and physical data
- Formula: C_{11}H_{16}BrNO_{3}
- Molar mass: 290.157 g·mol^{−1}
- 3D model (JSmol): Interactive image
- SMILES: COc1cc(c(cc1Br)OC)C(CN)OC
- InChI: InChI=1S/C11H16BrNO3/c1-14-9-5-8(12)10(15-2)4-7(9)11(6-13)16-3/h4-5,11H,6,13H2,1-3H3; Key:FYTLQNZPDWLGNU-UHFFFAOYSA-N

BOB, also known as 4-bromo-2,5,β-trimethoxyphenethylamine or as β-methoxy-2C-B, is a psychedelic drug of the phenethylamine, 2C, and BOx families. It is the β-methoxy derivative of 2C-B. BOB was first synthesized by Alexander Shulgin.

== Use and effects ==
In his book PiHKAL (Phenethylamines I Have Known and Loved), Alexander Shulgin lists BOB's dose range as 10 to 20 mg orally and its duration as 10 to 20 hours. The effects of BOB have been reported to include closed-eye visuals, a sense of awareness, a rich altered place, paranoia, feeling sociopathic, feeling indifferent or emotionless, irritability, neurological overstimulation and instability, tiredness, turmoil, body tingling, and tinnitus.

== Pharmacology ==
=== Pharmacodynamics ===
BOB acts as a serotonin 5-HT_{2A} receptor agonist. Its affinity (K_{i}) was found to be 2.0 nM and its EC_{50} was 0.12 nM with an E_{max} 63%. Its affinity was 20-fold lower than that of DOB, its activational potency was half that of DOB and its efficacy was slightly higher than that of DOB (63% and 38%, respectively). 2C-B was said to have comparable affinity as DOB.

== Chemistry ==
=== Synthesis ===
The chemical synthesis of BOB has been described.

=== Analogues ===
Analogues of BOB include BOH-2C-B (BOHB; β-hydroxy-2C-B), βk-2C-B (β-keto-2C-B), BOD (β-methoxy-2C-D), BOHD (β-hydroxy-2C-D), and β-methyl-2C-B (BMB), among others.

== History ==
BOB was first described in the scientific literature by Alexander Shulgin, Peyton Jacob III, and Darrell Lemaire in 1985. Subsequently, it was described in greater detail by Shulgin in his 1991 book PiHKAL (Phenethylamines I Have Known and Loved). The drug's pharmacology was studied by Richard Glennon and colleagues in 2004.

== Society and culture ==
=== Legal status ===
==== Canada ====
BOB is a controlled substance in Canada under phenethylamine blanket-ban language.

==== United Kingdom ====
This substance is a Class A drug in the Drugs controlled by the UK Misuse of Drugs Act.

==== United States ====
BOB is not an explicitly controlled substance in the United States. However, it could be considered a controlled substance under the Federal Analogue Act if intended for human consumption.

== See also ==
- BOx (psychedelics)
- 2C (psychedelics)
