= BOD (psychedelic) =

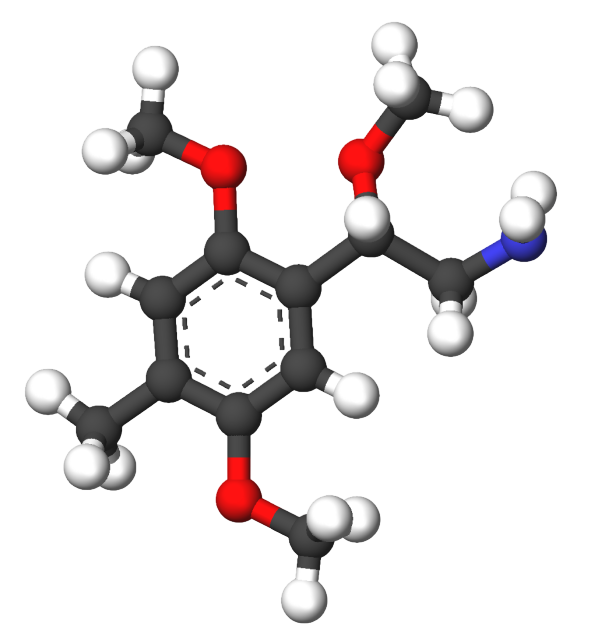

Clinical data
- Other names: β-Methoxy-2C-D; 4-Methyl-2,5,β-trimethoxyphenethylamine; β-MeO-2C-D
- Routes of administration: Oral
- Drug class: Serotonin receptor modulator; Serotonergic psychedelic; Hallucinogen
- ATC code: None

Pharmacokinetic data
- Onset of action: <30 minutes
- Duration of action: 8–16 hours

Identifiers
- IUPAC name: 2-(2,5-dimethoxy-4-methylphenyl)-2-methoxyethan-1-amine
- CAS Number: 98537-41-8
- PubChem CID: 44719486
- ChemSpider: 21106262
- UNII: 9PXE981731
- CompTox Dashboard (EPA): DTXSID50660350

Chemical and physical data
- Formula: C_{12}H_{19}NO_{3}
- Molar mass: 225.288 g·mol^{−1}
- 3D model (JSmol): Interactive image
- SMILES: COc1cc(C)c(cc1C(CN)OC)OC
- InChI: InChI=1S/C12H19NO3/c1-8-5-11(15-3)9(6-10(8)14-2)12(7-13)16-4/h5-6,12H,7,13H2,1-4H3; Key:VTEIFHQUZWABDE-UHFFFAOYSA-N

BOD, also known as 4-methyl-2,5,β-trimethoxyphenethylamine or as β-methoxy-2C-D, is a psychedelic drug of the phenethylamine, 2C, and BOx families. It is the β-methoxy derivative of 2C-D. The drug is taken orally. BOD has been encountered as a novel designer drug.

== Use and effects ==
In his book PiHKAL (Phenethylamines I Have Known and Loved), Alexander Shulgin lists BOD's dose range as 15 to 25 mg orally and its duration as 8 to 16 hours. Its onset is within 30 minutes and peak effects occur within 1 hour or as late as 2 to 2.5 hours.

The effects of BOD have been reported to include visual and contrast enhancement, closed-eye visuals, open-eye visuals, surroundings moving, no flowing of images, very little visual compared to certain other psychedelics, difficult to define mental effects, mood enhancement, pleasantness, religious feelings, enhanced conversation and conceptualization, relaxation, humor, little in the way of insights, and beautiful experience. Other effects included strange discomfort, some queasiness, minimal to quite noticeable body load, tiredness, mental sluggishness, confusion, and sleep disruption. One concluded that the "body price a bit too much for the mental effects".

== Pharmacology ==
=== Pharmacodynamics ===
BOD shows high affinity for the serotonin 5-HT_{2A} and 5-HT_{2C} receptors (K_{i} = 1.38 nM and 19.74 nM, respectively). It produces the head-twitch response, a behavioral proxy of psychedelic effects, in rodents. The head-twitch response induced by BOD can be blocked by both the serotonin 5-HT_{2A} receptor antagonist ketanserin and by the selective serotonin 5-HT_{2C} receptor antagonist SB-242084, suggesting involvement of both the serotonin 5-HT_{2A} and 5-HT_{2C} receptors in BOD's psychedelic-like effects. In addition to its psychedelic-like effects, BOD produces hypolocomotion and conditioned place preference (CPP) in rodents. Conversely, it does not produce self-administration. Similarly to other serotonergic psychedelics, BOD has been found to produce neurotoxicity in rodents.

== Chemistry ==
=== Synthesis ===
The chemical synthesis of BOD has been described.

=== Analogues ===
Analogues of BOD include BOHD (β-hydroxy-2C-D) and BOB (β-methoxy-2C-B), among others.

== History ==
BOB was first described in the scientific literature by Alexander Shulgin, Peyton Jacob III, and Darrell Lemaire in 1985. Subsequently, it was described in greater detail by Shulgin in his 1991 book PiHKAL (Phenethylamines I Have Known and Loved). It emerged as a novel designer drug by the 2010s.

== Society and culture ==
=== Legal status ===
==== Canada ====
BOD is a controlled substance in Canada under phenethylamine blanket-ban language.

==== United Kingdom ====
This substance is a Class A drug in the Drugs controlled by the UK Misuse of Drugs Act.

==== United States ====
BOD is unscheduled in the United States, but purchase, sale, or possession for human consumption could be prosecuted under the Federal Analogue Act.

== See also ==
- BOx (psychedelics)
- 2C (psychedelics)
