= Richard Glennon =

American medicinal chemist (born 1945)

- Born: July 1945 (age 81)
- Education: Northeastern University (B.S., M.S.); University at Buffalo (Ph.D., postdoc)
- Occupations: Medicinal chemist; Professor
- Years active: 1973–present
- Employer: Virginia Commonwealth University
- Website: https://pharmacy.vcu.edu/directory/glennon-richard.html

Richard A. Glennon is an American medicinal chemist who studies psychedelics, stimulants, entactogens, and other psychoactive drugs. He has been an important pioneer of the use of animal drug discrimination tests in scientific research for studying psychoactive drugs like hallucinogens. Glennon has also done a large amount of work on the structure–activity relationships of psychedelics. In addition, he played an important role in the discovery that the hallucinogenic effects of psychedelics are mediated by activation of serotonin 5-HT_{2} receptors. He is one of the most widely cited scientists in his field. Glennon was the editor-in-chief of the journal Medicinal Chemistry Research from 1992 to 2002. He retired in 2022 but has continued to publish reviews and research since then.

== Selected publications ==
- Glennon RA, Rosecrans JA (1981). "Speculations on the mechanism of action of hallucinogenic indolealkylamines". Neurosci Biobehav Rev. 5 (2): 197–207. doi:10.1016/0149-7634(81)90002-6. PMID 7022271.
- Glennon RA, Rosecrans JA (1982). "Indolealkylamine and phenalkylamine hallucinogens: a brief overview". Neurosci Biobehav Rev. 6 (4): 489–97. doi:10.1016/0149-7634(82)90030-6. PMID 6757811.
- Glennon RA, Rosecrans JA, Young R (1983). "Drug-induced discrimination: a description of the paradigm and a review of its specific application to the study of hallucinogenic agents". Med Res Rev. 3 (3): 289–340. doi:10.1002/med.2610030305. PMID 6350763.
- Glennon RA, Young R (January 1984). "MDA: a psychoactive agent with dual stimulus effects". Life Sci. 34 (4): 379–383. doi:10.1016/0024-3205(84)90627-1. PMID 6694526.
- Nichols DE, Glennon RA (1984). "Medicinal Chemistry and Structure-Activity Relationships of Hallucinogens". In Jacobs BL (ed.). Hallucinogens: Neurochemical, Behavioral, and Clinical Perspectives. New York: Raven Press. pp. 95–142. ISBN 978-0-89004-990-7. OCLC 10324237.
- Glennon RA, Titeler M, McKenney JD (December 1984). "Evidence for 5-HT2 involvement in the mechanism of action of hallucinogenic agents". Life Sci. 35 (25): 2505–2511. doi:10.1016/0024-3205(84)90436-3. PMID 6513725.
- Glennon RA (January 1987). "Central serotonin receptors as targets for drug research". J Med Chem. 30 (1): 1–12. doi:10.1021/jm00384a001. PMID 3543362.
- Titeler M, Lyon RA, Glennon RA (1988). "Radioligand binding evidence implicates the brain 5-HT2 receptor as a site of action for LSD and phenylisopropylamine hallucinogens". Psychopharmacology (Berl). 94 (2): 213–216. doi:10.1007/BF00176847. PMID 3127847.
- Glennon RA (1990). "Serotonin receptors: clinical implications". Neurosci Biobehav Rev. 14 (1): 35–47. doi:10.1016/s0149-7634(05)80158-7. PMID 2183098.
- Glennon RA (1991). "Discriminative stimulus properties of hallucinogens and related designer drugs" (PDF). NIDA Res Monogr (116): 25–44. PMID 1369672. Archived from the original (PDF) on August 5, 2023.
- Glennon RA, Teitler M, Sanders-Bush E (1992). "Hallucinogens and serotonergic mechanisms" (PDF). NIDA Res Monogr. 119: 131–135. PMID 1435968. Archived from the original (PDF) on August 5, 2023.
- Glennon RA (1994). "Classical hallucinogens: an introductory overview" (PDF). In Lin GC, Glennon RA (eds.). Hallucinogens: An Update. NIDA Research Monograph Series. Vol. 146. Rockville, MD: U.S. Dept. of Health and Human Services, Public Health Service, National Institutes of Health, National Institute on Drug Abuse. p. 4. Archived (PDF) from the original on 2011-07-25.
- Glennon RA (October 1999). "Arylalkylamine drugs of abuse: an overview of drug discrimination studies". Pharmacol Biochem Behav. 64 (2): 251–256. doi:10.1016/s0091-3057(99)00045-3. PMID 10515299.
- Glennon, R.A.; Young, R. (2011). Drug Discrimination: Applications to Medicinal Chemistry and Drug Studies. Wiley. doi:10.1002/9781118023150. ISBN 978-0-470-43352-2.
- Glennon RA, Dukat M (2017). "Synthetic Cathinones: A Brief Overview of Overviews with Applications to the Forensic Sciences". Ann Forensic Res Anal. 4 (2). PMC 6168209. PMID 30288398.
- Glennon RA, Dukat M (2017). "Structure-Activity Relationships of Synthetic Cathinones". Neuropharmacology of New Psychoactive Substances (NPS). Current Topics in Behavioral Neurosciences. Vol. 32. pp. 19–47. doi:10.1007/7854_2016_41. ISBN 978-3-319-52442-9. PMC 5818155. PMID 27830576.
- Glennon RA (April 2017). "The 2014 Philip S. Portoghese Medicinal Chemistry Lectureship: The "Phenylalkylaminome" with a Focus on Selected Drugs of Abuse". J Med Chem. 60 (7): 2605–2628. doi:10.1021/acs.jmedchem.7b00085. PMC 5824997. PMID 28244748.
- Glennon RA, Dukat MG (December 2023). "α-Ethyltryptamine: A Ratiocinatory Review of a Forgotten Antidepressant". ACS Pharmacol Transl Sci. 6 (12): 1780–1789. doi:10.1021/acsptsci.3c00139. PMC 10714429. PMID 38093842.
- Glennon RA, Dukat M (June 2024). "1-(2,5-Dimethoxy-4-iodophenyl)-2-aminopropane (DOI): From an Obscure to Pivotal Member of the DOX Family of Serotonergic Psychedelic Agents - A Review". ACS Pharmacol Transl Sci. 7 (6): 1722–1745. doi:10.1021/acsptsci.4c00157. PMC 11184610. PMID 38898956.

== See also ==
- List of psychedelic chemists
- David E. Nichols
- Alexander Shulgin
- Daniel Trachsel
