= C11H15N =

The molecular formula C_{11}H_{15}N (molar mass: 161.24 g/mol) may refer to:

- 6-AB
- 7-AB
- Alfetamine, or alpha-allyl-phenethylamine
- N,N-Dimethyl-2-aminoindane, or NNDMAI
- Cypenamine, or 2-phenylcyclopentylamine
- Phenylpiperidine
  - 2-Phenylpiperidine
  - 3-Phenylpiperidine
  - 4-Phenylpiperidine
