= Substituted phenethylamine =

Chemical class of organic compounds

- Drug class
- The structural formula of phenethylamine with marked substitution points. Phenethylamine is obtained when R^{2}=R^{3}=R^{4}=R^{5}=R^{6}=R^{N}=R^{α}=R^{β}=H.

Class identifiers
- Chemical class: Substituted derivatives of phenethylamine

Legal status

Substituted phenethylamines (or simply phenethylamines) are a chemical class of organic compounds that are based upon the phenethylamine structure; (Note: In other words, all of the compounds that belong to this class are structural analogs of phenethylamine.) the class is composed of all the derivative compounds of phenethylamine which can be formed by replacing, or substituting, one or more hydrogen atoms in the phenethylamine core structure with substituents. Phenylethylamines are also generally found to be central nervous system stimulants with many also being entactogens/empathogens, and hallucinogens.

== Structural classification ==
The structure of the parent phenethylamine

The structural formula of any substituted phenethylamine contains a phenyl ring that is joined to an amino (NH) group via a two-carbon sidechain. Hence, any substituted phenethylamine can be classified according to the substitution of hydrogen (H) atoms on phenethylamine's phenyl ring, sidechain, or amino group with a specific group of atoms. Several classes of substances can be considered phenylethylamine derivatives such as Substituted amphetamines, where there is a methyl group substituted at the alpha position on the ethyl chain, Substituted methylenedioxyphenethylamines, where a methylenedioxy group is joined at the 3 and 4 positions on the phenyl ring, and Substituted cathinones, which have a carbonyl group substituted at the beta position on the ethyl chain, most of which also have a methyl group substituted at the alpha positioning making most cathinones substituted amphetamines as well.

== Pharmacology ==
Most substituted phenethylamines are psychoactive drugs which belong to a variety of different drug classes, including central nervous system stimulants (e.g., amphetamine), hallucinogens (e.g., 3,4,5-trimethoxyphenethylamine a.k.a. mescaline, 2,5-dimethoxy-4-methylamphetamine a.k.a. DOM), entactogens (e.g., 3,4-methylenedioxy-N-methylamphetamine a.k.a. MDMA), appetite suppressants (e.g. phentermine), nasal decongestants and bronchodilators (e.g., levomethamphetamine and pseudoephedrine), antidepressants (e.g. bupropion and phenelzine), antiparkinson agents (e.g., selegiline), and vasopressors (e.g., ephedrine), among others. Many of these psychoactive compounds exert their pharmacological effects primarily by modulating monoamine neurotransmitter systems; however, there is no known mechanism of action or biological target that is common to all members of this subclass, however, the majority act through modulating monoamine transporter function, meanwhile the hallucinogens tend to have more direct interactions with post-synaptic receptors such as 5-HT2A while retaining some or most of their transporter modulating properties. The irreversible MAOIs that constitute a phenethylamine backbone, such as the phenethylamine and hydrazine derivative phenelzine, does not interact with any monoamine transporters or post-synaptic receptors but still elevates monoamine and trace amine concentrations by inhibiting monoamine oxidase enzymes.

== Examples ==
Numerous endogenous compounds – including hormones, catecholamines such as dopamine and noradrenaline, and many trace amines (e.g. adrenaline, phenethylamine itself, tyramine, thyronamine, and iodothyronamine) – are substituted phenethylamines. Several notable recreational drugs, such as MDPV (Monkey Dust), MDMA (ecstasy), mescaline, methamphetamine, and cathinone, are also members of the class. Many well-known prescription drugs are from the phenylethylamine class such as Adderall which uses Amphetamine, Desoxyn which uses methamphetamine, and Sudafed which uses pseudoephedrine.

== List of substituted phenethylamines ==
Selected Phenethylamines
| Structure | Short Name | R^{N} | R^{α} | R^{β} | R^{2} | R^{3} | R^{4} | R^{5} | Full Name | Biologic activity |
|---|---|---|---|---|---|---|---|---|---|---|
| | Phenethylamine | | | | | | | | phenethylamine | Trace amine |
| | α,α-Dideuterophenethylamine | | D,D | | | | | | α,α-dideuterophenethylamine | Deuterated drug |
| | α,α,β,β-Tetradeuterophenethylamine | | D,D | D,D | | | | | α,α,β,β-tetradeuterophenethylamine | Deuterated drug |
| | para-Tyramine | | | | | | OH | | 4-hydroxyphenethylamine | Trace amine |
| | Dopamine | | | | | OH | OH | | 3,4-dihydroxyphenethylamine | Catecholamine neurotransmitter |
| | Epinephrine (Adrenaline) | CH_{3} | | OH | | OH | OH | | β,3,4-trihydroxy-N-methylphenethylamine | Catecholamine neurotransmitter/Fight or Flight hormone |
| | Norepinephrine (Noradrenaline) | | | OH | | OH | OH | | β,3,4-trihydroxyphenethylamine | Catecholamine neurotransmitter/Fight or Flight hormone |
| | Norfenefrine | | | OH | | OH | | | β,3-dihydroxyphenethylamine | Trace amine |
| | para-Octopamine | | | OH | | | OH | | β,4-dihydroxyphenethylamine | Trace aminergic α-adrenoceptor agonist |
| | Oxidopamine | | | | OH | | OH | OH | 2,4,5-trihydroxyphenethylamine | neurotoxic agent for the dopamine and norepinephrine receptors |
| | Phenylephrine | CH_{3} | | OH | | OH | | | β,3-dihydroxy-N-methylphenethylamine | α-adrenergic agonist; decongestant |
| | Isoprenaline | CH(CH_{3})_{2} | | OH | | OH | OH | | β,3-dihydroxy-N-isopropylphenethylamine | β-adrenergic agonist; decongestant |
| | Salbutamol | C(CH_{3})_{3} | | OH | | CH_{2}OH | OH | | β,4-dihydroxy-3-hydroxymethyl-N-tert-butylphenethylamine | Short-action β_{2}-adrenergic agonist |
| | β-Methylphenethylamine | | | CH_{3} | | | | | β-methylphenethylamine | Stimulant |
| | Amphetamine | | CH_{3} | | | | | | α-methylphenethylamine | Monoamine releasing agent; Stimulant |
| | N-Methylphenethylamine | CH_{3} | | | | | | | N-methylphenethylamine | Trace amine; endogenous amphetamine isomer |
| | N,N-Dimethylphenethylamine | (CH_{3})_{2} | | | | | | | N,N-dimethylphenethylamine | Trivial effects (used as a food additive and flavoring agent) |
| | Methamphetamine | CH_{3} | CH_{3} | | | | | | N-methylamphetamine; N,α-dimethylphenethylamine | Monoamine releasing agent; stimulant; neurotoxin |
| | Phentermine | | (CH_{3})_{2} | | | | | | α-methylamphetamine; α,α-dimethylphenethylamine | Stimulant, anorectic |
| | Ortetamine | | CH_{3} | | CH_{3} | | | | 2-methylamphetamine; 2,α-dimethylphenethylamine | Stimulant, anorectic |
| | Phenelzine | NH_{2} | | | | | | | β-phenylethylhydrazine | Monoamine oxidase inhibitor |
| | Tranylcypromine | | -CH_{2}- | | | | | | 2-phenylcyclopropylamine | Monoamine oxidase inhibitor |
| | Selegiline | -CH_{2}-C≡CH | CH_{3} | | | | | | N,α-dimethyl-N-2-propynylphenethylamine | MAO-B selective monoamine oxidase inhibitor |
| | Methylphenidate | -CH_{2}-CH_{2}-CH_{2}-CH_{2}- | | C(OCH_{3})=O | | | | | N,α-butylene-β-methoxycarbonylphenethylamine | NDRI; Stimulant |
| | Ephedrine / Pseudoephedrine | CH_{3} | CH_{3} | OH | | | | | N-methyl-β-hydroxyamphetamine | Releasing agent; stimulant; decongestant |
| | Cathine | | CH_{3} | OH | | | | | d-β-hydroxyamphetamine | Moderately selective norepinephrine releasing agent |
| | Cathinone | | CH_{3} | =O | | | | | β-ketoamphetamine | Selective norepinephrine and dopamine releasing agent |
| | Methcathinone | CH_{3} | CH_{3} | =O | | | | | N-methylcathinone | Selective norepinephrine and dopamine releasing agent |
| | Mephedrone | CH_{3} | CH_{3} | =O | | | CH_{3} | | 4-methylmethcathinone | Stimulant, unknown pharmacodynamic actions |
| | Ethcathinone | CH_{2}CH_{3} | CH_{3} | =O | | | | | N-ethylcathinone | Stimulant and norepinephrine releasing agent |
| | Amfepramone (diethylpropion) | C_{2}H_{5}, C_{2}H_{5} (Note: Two ethyl groups attached to the amine group) | CH_{3} | =O | | | | | N-diethyl-β-ketoamphetamine | Anorectic |
| | Bupropion | C(CH_{3})_{3} | CH_{3} | =O | | | | Cl | 5-chloro-N-tert-butyl-β-ketoamphetamine | NDRI |
| | Norfenfluramine | | CH_{3} | | | CF_{3} | | | 3-trifluoromethyl-amphetamine | SSRA |
| | Fenfluramine | CH_{2}CH_{3} | CH_{3} | | | CF_{3} | | | 3-trifluoromethyl-N-ethylamphetamine | SSRA |
| | 5-APB | | CH_{3} | | | -CH=CH-O- | | | 5-(2-aminopropyl)benzofuran | Stimulant, entactogen |
| | 6-APB | | CH_{3} | | | -O-CH=CH- | | | 6-(2-aminopropyl)benzofuran | Stimulant, entactogen |
| | MDA | | CH_{3} | | | -O-CH_{2}-O- | | | 3,4-methylenedioxy-amphetamine | Stimulant, psychedelic, entactogen |
| | MDEA | CH_{2}CH_{3} | CH_{3} | | | -O-CH_{2}-O- | | | 3,4-methylenedioxy-N-ethylamphetamine | Psychedelic, entactogen, and releasing agent |
| | MDMA | CH_{3} | CH_{3} | | | -O-CH_{2}-O- | | | 3,4-methylenedioxy-N-methylamphetamine | Psychedelic, entactogen, and releasing agent |
| | MDMC (methylone) | CH_{3} | CH_{3} | =O | | -O-CH_{2}-O- | | | 3,4-methylenedioxymethcathinone | Psychedelic, entactogen, and releasing agent |
| | MMDA | | CH_{3} | | | -O-CH_{2}-O- | | OCH_{3} | 5-methoxy-3,4-methylenedioxy-amphetamine | Stimulant, psychedelic and entactogen |
| | MMDMA | CH_{3} | CH_{3} | | | -O-CH_{2}-O- | | OCH_{3} | 5-methoxy-3,4-methylenedioxy-N-methylamphetamine | Psychedelic, entactogen, and releasing agent |
| | Lophophine | | | | | -O-CH_{2}-O- | | OCH_{3} | 5-methoxy-3,4-methylenedioxyphenethylamine | Psychedelic and entactogen |
| | Mescaline | | | | | OCH_{3} | OCH_{3} | OCH_{3} | 3,4,5-trimethoxyphenethylamine | Psychedelic and entactogen |
| | Proscaline | | | | | OCH_{3} | OCH_{2}CH_{2}CH_{3} | OCH_{3} | 2-(3,5-dimethoxy-4-propoxyphenyl)ethanamine | Psychedelic and entactogen |
| | Metaescaline | | | | | OCH_{2}CH_{3} | OCH_{3} | OCH_{3} | 2-(3-ethoxy-4,5-dimethoxyphenyl)ethanamine | Psychedelic and entactogen |
| | Allylescaline | | | | | OCH_{3} | OCH_{2}CH_{1}CH_{2} | OCH_{3} | 4-Allyloxy-3,5-dimethyloxyphenylethylamine | Psychedelic and entactogen |
| | Methallylescaline | | | | | OCH_{3} | OCH_{2}C(CH_{2}CH_{3}) | OCH_{3} | 4-Methallyloxy-3,5-dimethoxyphenethylamine | Psychedelic and entactogen |
| | Asymbescaline | | | | | OCH_{2}CH_{3} | OCH_{2}CH_{3} | OCH_{3} | 3,4-Diethoxy-5-methoxyphenethylamine | Psychedelic and euphoriant |
| | DOM | | CH_{3} | | OCH_{3} | | CH_{3} | OCH_{3} | 2,5-dimethoxy-4-methylamphetamine | Psychedelic |
| | DOB | | CH_{3} | | OCH_{3} | | Br | OCH_{3} | 2,5-dimethoxy-4-bromoamphetamine | Psychedelic |
| | DOC | | CH_{3} | | OCH_{3} | | Cl | OCH_{3} | 2,5-dimethoxy-4-chloroamphetamine | Psychedelic |
| | DOI | | CH_{3} | | OCH_{3} | | I | OCH_{3} | 2,5-dimethoxy-4-iodoamphetamine | Psychedelic |
| | DON | | CH_{3} | | OCH_{3} | | NO_{2} | OCH_{3} | 2,5-dimethoxy-4-nitroamphetamine | Stimulant |
| | 2C-B | | | | OCH_{3} | | Br | OCH_{3} | 2,5-dimethoxy-4-bromophenethylamine | Psychedelic, stimulant, entactogen and euphoriant |
| | βk-2C-B | | | =O | OCH_{3} | | Br | OCH_{3} | 2,5-dimethoxy-4-bromo-β-ketophenethylamine | Psychedelic, stimulant, entactogen and euphoriant |
| | 2C-C | | | | OCH_{3} | | Cl | OCH_{3} | 2,5-dimethoxy-4-chlorophenethylamine | Psychedelic |
| | 2C-F | | | | OCH_{3} | | F | OCH_{3} | 2,5-dimethoxy-4-fluorophenethylamine | Psychedelic |
| | 2C-I | | | | OCH_{3} | | I | OCH_{3} | 2,5-dimethoxy-4-iodophenethylamine | Psychedelic, stimulant |
| | 2C-D | | | | OCH_{3} | | CH_{3} | OCH_{3} | 2,5-dimethoxy-4-methylphenethylamine | Psychedelic, stimulant |
| | 2C-E | | | | OCH_{3} | | CH_{2}-CH_{3} | OCH_{3} | 2,5-dimethoxy-4-ethylphenethylamine | Psychedelic |
| | 2C-P | | | | OCH_{3} | | CH_{2}-CH_{3}-CH_{3} | OCH_{3} | 2,5-dimethoxy-4-propylphenethylamine | Entactogen, euphoriant and Psychedelic |
| | 2C-N | | | | OCH_{3} | | NO_{2} | OCH_{3} | 2,5-dimethoxy-4-nitrophenethylamine | euphoriant |
| | 2C-O-4 | | | | OCH_{3} | | (CH_{3})_{2}CHO | OCH_{3} | 2,5-Dimethoxy-4-propoxyphenethylamine | Hallucinogen, psychedelic and entheogenic |
| | 2C-T-2 | | | | OCH_{3} | | S-CH_{2}CH_{3} | OCH_{3} | 2,5-dimethoxy-4-ethylthio-phenethylamine | Psychedelic |
| | 2C-T-4 | | | | OCH_{3} | | S-CH(CH_{3})_{2} | OCH_{3} | 2,5-dimethoxy-4-isopropylthio-phenethylamine | Psychedelic |
| | 2C-T-7 | | | | OCH_{3} | | S-CH_{2}CH_{2}CH_{3} | OCH_{3} | 2,5-dimethoxy-4-propylthio-phenethylamine | Psychedelic |
| | 2C-T-8 | | | | OCH_{3} | | S-CH_{2}-C_{3}H_{5} | OCH_{3} | 2,5-dimethoxy-4-cyclopropylmethylthio-phenethylamine | Psychedelic |
| | 2C-T-19 | | | | OCH_{3} | | S-C(CH_{3})_{3} | OCH_{3} | 2,5-dimethoxy-4-tert-butylthio-phenethylamine | Psychedelic |
| | 2C-T-21 | | | | OCH_{3} | | S-CH_{2}-CH_{2}-F | OCH_{3} | 2,5-dimethoxy-4-(2-fluoroethylthio)-phenethylamine | Psychedelic and euphoriant |
| | 25B-NBOMe | CH_{2}-C_{6}H_{4}-OCH_{3} | | | OCH_{3} | | Br | OCH_{3} | 2-(4-bromo-2,5-dimethoxyphenyl)-N-[(2-methoxyphenyl)methyl]ethanamine | Psychedelic |
| | 25C-NBOMe | CH_{2}-C_{6}H_{4}-OCH_{3} | | | OCH_{3} | | Cl | OCH_{3} | 2-(4-chloro-2,5-dimethoxyphenyl)-N-[(2-methoxyphenyl)methyl]ethanamine | Psychedelic |
| | 25F-NBOMe | CH_{2}-C_{6}H_{4}-OCH_{3} | | | OCH_{3} | | F | OCH_{3} | 2-(4-fluoro-2,5-dimethoxyphenyl)-N-[(2-methoxyphenyl)methyl]ethanamine | Psychedelic |
| | 25I-NBOMe | CH_{2}-C_{6}H_{4}-OCH_{3} | | | OCH_{3} | | I | OCH_{3} | 2-(4-iodo-2,5-dimethoxyphenyl)-N-[(2-methoxyphenyl)methyl]ethanamine | Psychedelic |
| | 25D-NBOMe | CH_{2}-C_{6}H_{4}-OCH_{3} | | | OCH_{3} | | CH_{2} | OCH_{3} | 2-(4-methyl-2,5-dimethoxyphenyl)-N-[(2-methoxyphenyl)methyl]ethanamine | Psychedelic |
| | 25E-NBOMe | CH_{2}-C_{6}H_{4}-OCH_{3} | | | OCH_{3} | | CH_{2}-CH_{3} | OCH_{3} | 2-(4-ethyl-2,5-dimethoxyphenyl)-N-[(2-methoxyphenyl)methyl]ethanamine | Psychedelic |
| | 25P-NBOMe | CH_{2}-C_{6}H_{4}-OCH_{3} | | | OCH_{3} | | CH_{2}-CH_{3}-CH_{3} | OCH_{3} | 2-(4-propyl-2,5-dimethoxyphenyl)-N-[(2-methoxyphenyl)methyl]ethanamine | Psychedelic |
| | Mescaline-NBOMe | CH_{2}-C_{6}H_{4}-OCH_{3} | | | | OCH_{3} | OCH_{3} | OCH_{3} | N-(2-Methoxybenzyl)-2-(3,4,5-trimethoxyphenyl)ethanamine | Psychedelic |
| | 25B-NBOH | CH_{2}–C_{6}H_{4}–OH | | | OCH_{3} | | Br | OCH_{3} | N-(2-hydroxybenzyl)-2,5-dimethoxy-4-bromo-phenethylamine | Psychedelic |
| | 25C-NBOH | CH_{2}–C_{6}H_{4}–OH | | | OCH_{3} | | Cl | OCH_{3} | N-(2-hydroxybenzyl)-2,5-dimethoxy-4-chloro-phenethylamine | Psychedelic |
| | 25I-NBOH | CH_{2}–C_{6}H_{4}–OH | | | OCH_{3} | | I | OCH_{3} | N-(2-hydroxybenzyl)-2,5-dimethoxy-4-iodo-phenethylamine | Psychedelic |
| | 25I-NBF | CH_{2}–C_{6}H_{4}–F | | | OCH_{3} | | I | OCH_{3} | N-(2-fluorobenzyl)-2,5-dimethoxy-4-iodo-phenethylamine | Psychedelic |
| | Short Name | R^{N} | R^{α} | R^{β} | R^{2} | R^{3} | R^{4} | R^{5} | Full Name | Biologic activity |

== Detection ==
| Method | Requirement |
|---|---|
| UV spectrometry | Reagent needed |

Detection of substituted phenethylamines, which include compounds such as 2C-B, MDMA, and other designer drugs, involves various analytical methods aimed at identifying these psychoactive substances. These compounds are structurally similar to amphetamines, making their detection challenging due to potential cross-reactivity in standard drug tests. Techniques like gas chromatography-mass spectrometry (GC-MS), liquid chromatography-mass spectrometry (LC-MS), and immunoassay screenings are commonly employed for accurate identification. Advanced methods like high-performance liquid chromatography (HPLC) allow for precise separation and quantification of these substances even at low concentrations. Given the rising use of these drugs in recreational settings, developing sensitive and specific detection techniques remains crucial in forensic toxicology and clinical diagnostics.

== Cyclized phenethylamines ==
There are many cyclized phenethylamines. Examples include the following:

- Phenylalkylpyrrolidines like PEP, MPEP, prolintane, α-PPP, α-PVP, pyrovalerone, and MDPV
- Phenylalkylpiperidines like AC927 (phenethylpiperidine), diphenidine, fentanyl, and ifenprodil
- Tetrahydroisoquinolines (THIQs) like anhalinine, pellotine, lophophorine, DOM-CR, nomifensine, tetrabenazine, and zelandopam
- Isoquinolines like perafensine, quinisocaine, and tilisolol
- Dihydroindoles and aminochromes like adrenochrome and adrenolutin
- 2-Aminoindanes (2-AIs) like 2-aminoindane, MDAI, MMAI, DOM-AI, and Pyr-AI
- 2-Aminotetralins (2-ATs) like 2-aminotetralin, MDAT, DOM-AT, 8-OH-DPAT, rotigotine, and UH-232
- 1-Aminomethylindanes (1-AMIs) like 2CB-Ind, AMMI, jimscaline, and bromojimscaline
- 3-Benzazepines like fenoldopam and lorcaserin
- Benzocyclobutenes (BCBs) like 2CBCB-NBOMe, S33005, TCB-2, tomscaline, and bromotomscaline
- 3-Aminochromans like CT-5126, 5-MeO-DPAC, robalzotan, and ebalzotan
- Benzoxepins like TFMBOX
- Phenylmethylpyrrolidines (benzylpyrrolidines) like APA-01 (PharmAla-1)
- 2-Benzylpiperidines and phenidates like 2-benzylpiperidine, methylphenidate, rimiterol, and DMBMPP
- Phenylcyclopropylamines like tranylcypromine, TMT, and DMCPA
- 3-Phenylpiperidines (3PIPs) like 3-phenylpiperidine, 3-PPP, OSU-6162 (PNU-96391), LPH-5, LPH-48, 2C-B-3PIP, 2C-B-3PIP-NBOMe, 2C-B-3PIP-POMe, and Z3517967757 (Z7757)
- 2-Phenylmorpholines like 2-phenylmorpholine, phenmetrazine, manifaxine, radafaxine, flumexadol, oxaflozane, and PF-219,061
- Phenyloxazolamines or aminorex analogues like aminorex and pemoline
- Tricyclic compounds like benzoctamine and dizocilpine
- Ergolines and lysergamides like ergine (LSA) and LSD
- Partial ergolines and lysergamides like NDTDI, RU-27849, UCD0179, and UCD0120
- Pyridopyrroloquinoxalines like lumateperone, IHCH-7113, IHCH-7086, and ITI-1549
- Anthracenes like AMDA and SpAMDA
- Phenanthrenes like atherosperminine
- Aporphines like aporphine, apomorphine, glaucine, and nuciferine
- Others like 6-AB, 2-ADN, 2C-B-PYR, 2C-B-5-hemiFLY-α6 (BNAP), 2CB7 (2C-B-5-hemiFLY-β7), 2CBecca, 2CJP, 2CLisaB, 2CLisaH, 2-naphthylamine, AMMI, GYKI-52895, ivabradine, milnacipran, Org 6582, and ZC-B

Some additional cyclized phenethylamines have also been described.

Other related families that are not phenethylamines themselves include phenylpiperazines, benzylpiperazines, and 4-phenylpiperidines.

Chemical structures of selected cyclized phenethylamines and closely related compounds
Phenethylamine (PEA)

Phenylethylpyrrolidine (PEP)

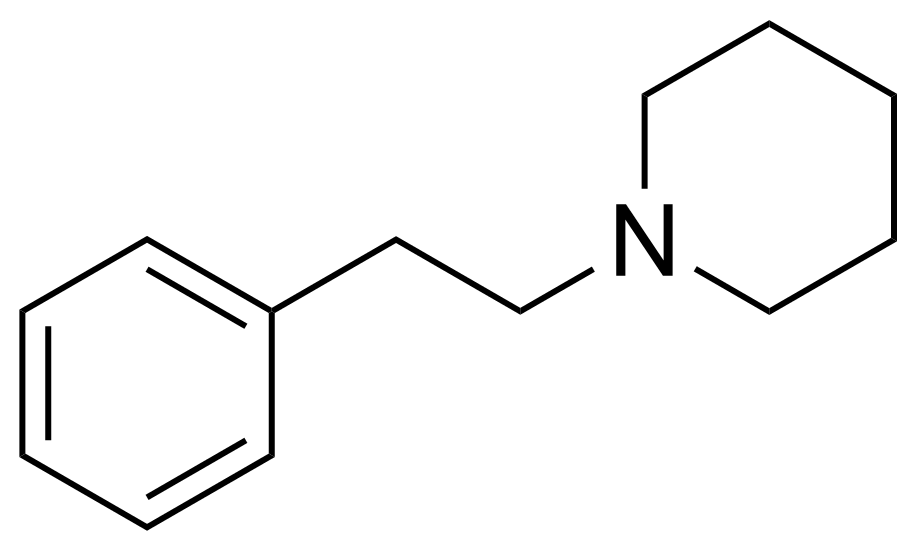
AC927 (phenylethylpiperidine)

Tetrahydroisoquinoline (THIQ)

Indoline (dihydroindole)

2-Aminoindane (2-AI)

2-Aminotetralin (2-ATI)

1-Aminomethylindane (1-AMI)

Tetrahydro-3-benzazepine

Aminomethylbenzocyclobutene

3-Aminochroman

Tetrahydrobenzoxepinamine

Phenylmethylpyrrolidine

2-Benzylpiperidine

Tranylcypromine

3-Phenylpiperidine

2-Phenylmorpholine

5-Phenyl-2-oxazoline

Benzoctamine

Dizocilpine

Ergoline

UCD0179

UCD0120

RU-27849

IHCH-7113

AMDA

Atherosperminine

Aporphine

6-AB

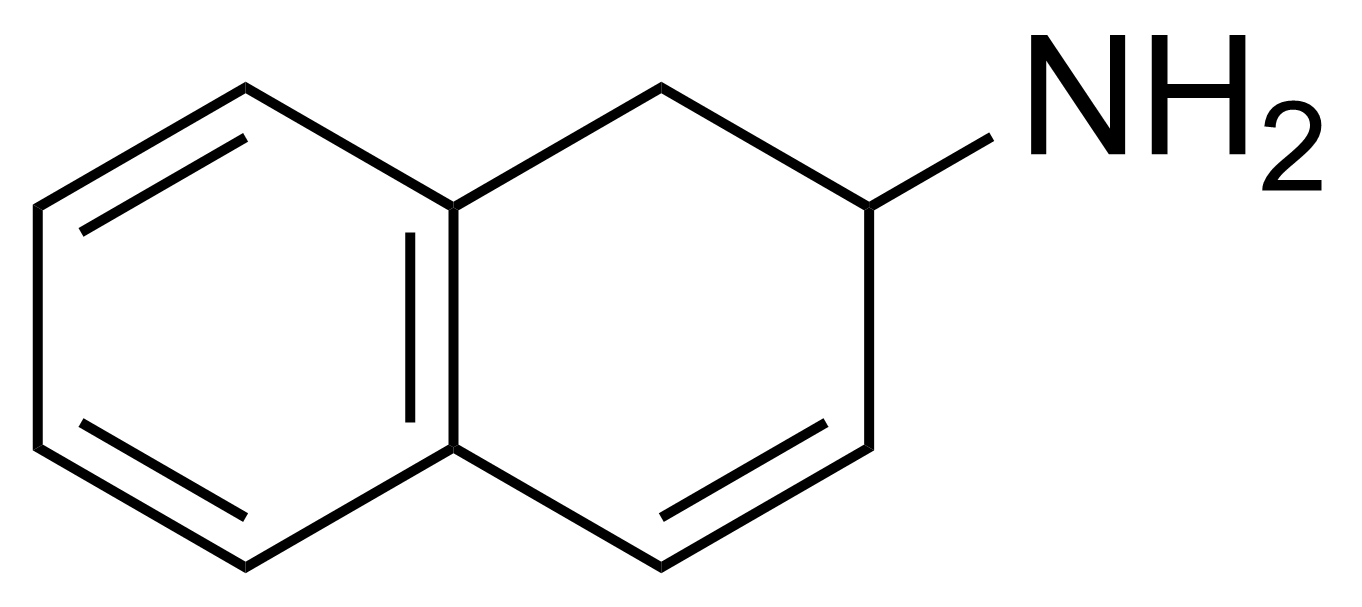
2-ADN

2C-B-PYR

2C-B-5-hemiFLY-α6

2CB7

2CBecca

2CJP

2CLisaB

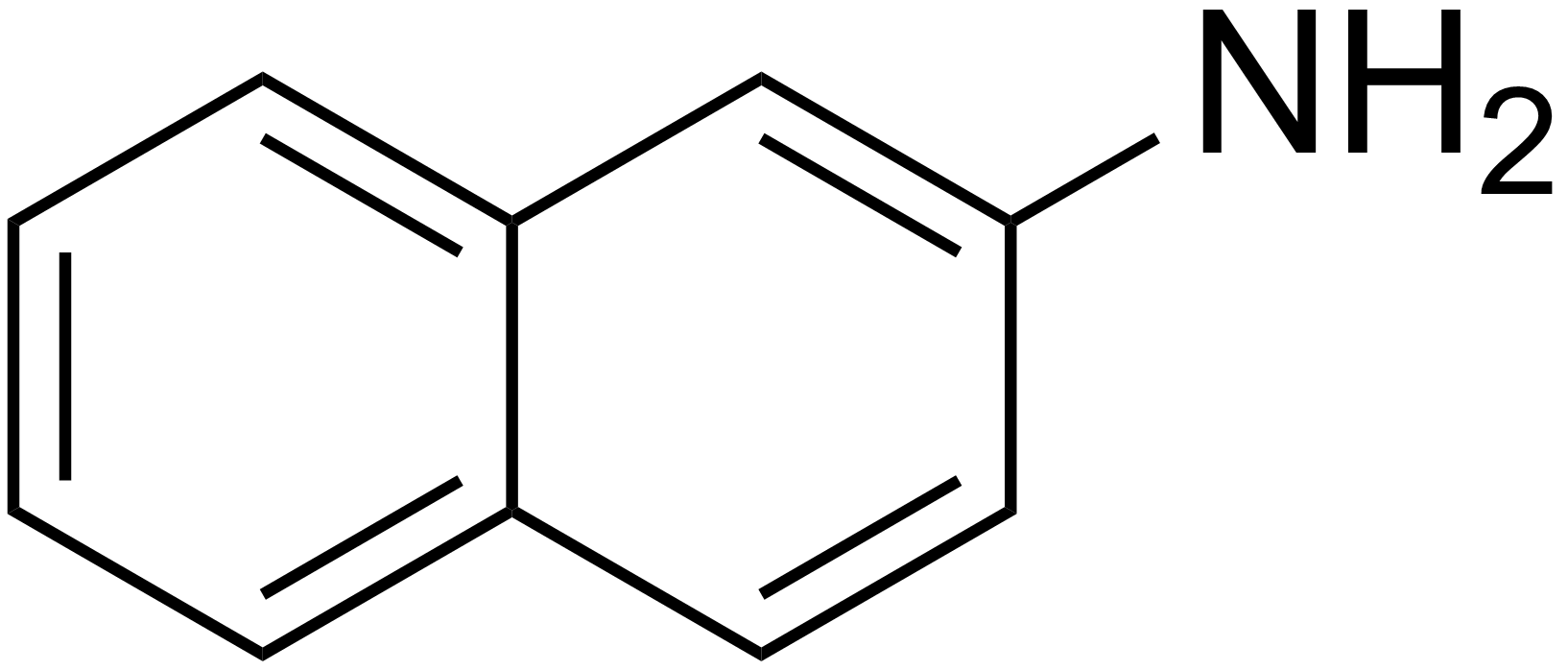
2-Naphthylamine

GYKI-52895

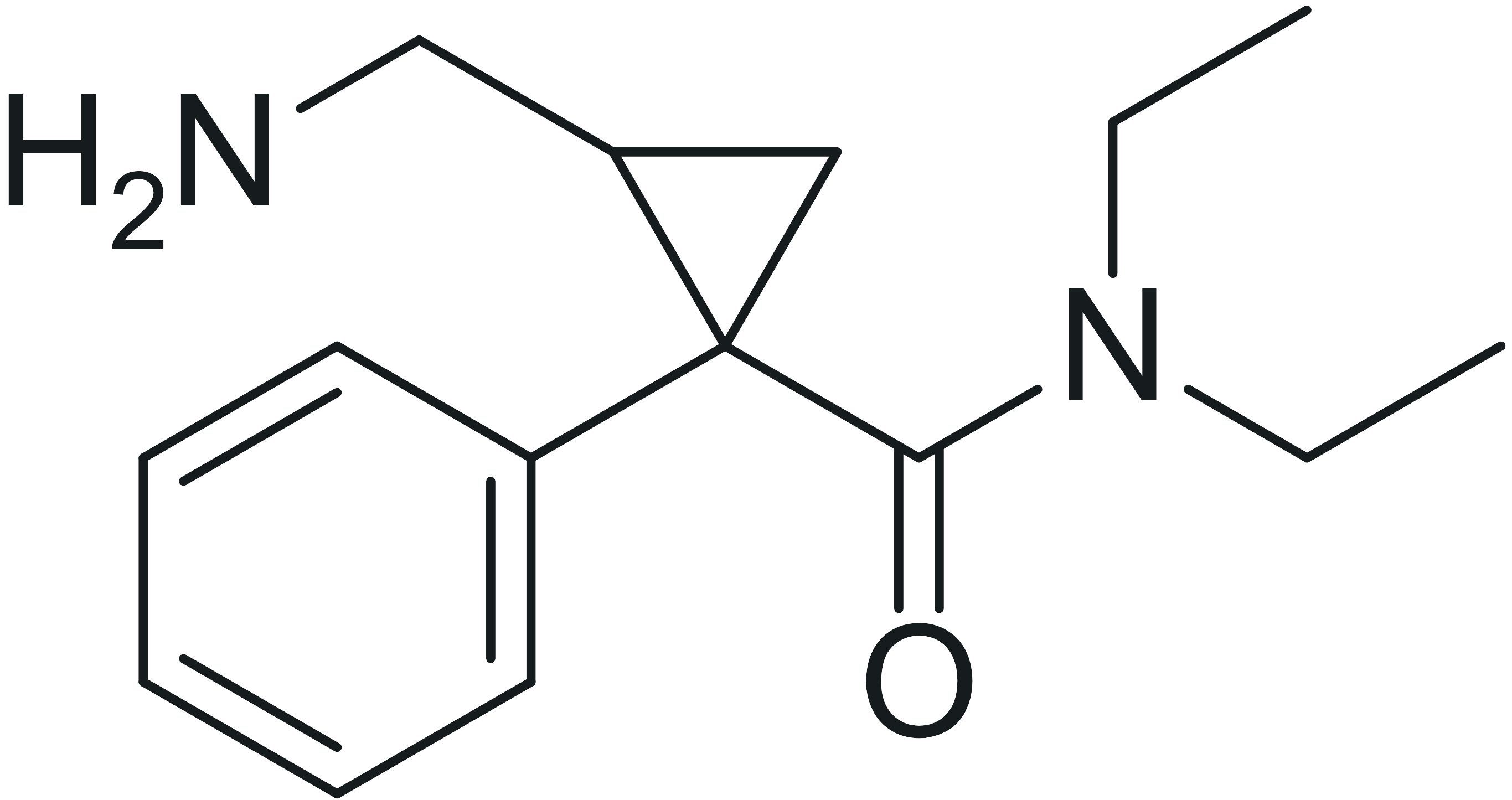
Milnacipran

Org 6582

ZC-B

1-Phenylpiperazine

1-Benzylpiperazine

4-Phenylpiperidine

== See also ==
- Arylalkylamine
- Substituted amphetamine
- Substituted methylenedioxyphenethylamine
- Substituted cathinone
- Substituted phenylmorpholine
- Substituted methoxyphenethylamine
- 2C, DOx, 4C, Ψ-PEA, scaline, 3C, 25-NB, FLY
- Substituted tryptamine
- PiHKAL
- The Shulgin Index
