= C18H27NO2 =

The molecular formula C_{18}H_{27}NO_{2} may refer to:

- Alifedrine, a partial beta-adrenergic agonist
- Caramiphen, an anticholinergic drug
- Dyclonine, an over-the-counter local anesthetic
- S33005, a serotonin–norepinephrine reuptake inhibitor
- WS-12
