= C12H15NO2 =

The molecular formula C_{12}H_{15}NO_{2} (molar mass: 205.2535 g/mol, exact mass: 205.1103 u) may refer to:

- 2C-YN
- APA-01
- MDMAT (6,7-methylenedioxy-N-methyl-2-aminotetralin)
- Mebfap
