= C13H19N =

The molecular formula C_{13}H_{19}N (molar mass: 189.30 g/mol, exact mass: 189.1517 u) may refer to:

- AC927 (phenethylpiperidine)
- Enefexine (4-(4-ethylphenyl)piperidine)
- MPEP (drug)
- 6-APT (6-(2-aminopropyl)tetralin)
- 5-MAPDI (indanylmethylaminopropane)
