= C17H24N2O3 =

The molecular formula C_{17}H_{24}N_{2}O_{3} (molar mass: 304.39 g/mol) may refer to:

- 3,4-MDO-U-47700
- N-Methylcarfentanil
- Tilisolol
