= 2C-V =

Psychedelic drug

Clinical data
- Other names: 2C-VI; 4-Ethenyl-2,5-dimethoxyphenethylamine; 4-Vinyl-2,5-dimethoxyphenethylamine; 2,5-Dimethoxy-4-ethenylphenethylamine; 2,5-Dimethoxy-4-vinylphenethylamine
- Routes of administration: Oral
- Drug class: Serotonergic psychedelic; Hallucinogen

Pharmacokinetic data
- Duration of action: 5 hours

Identifiers
- IUPAC name: 2-(4-ethenyl-2,5-dimethoxyphenyl)ethanamine
- CAS Number: 2888537-57-1
- PubChem CID: 57474284
- ChemSpider: 129433732
- UNII: F5U9H625TA
- CompTox Dashboard (EPA): DTXSID501337027

Chemical and physical data
- Formula: C_{12}H_{17}NO_{2}
- Molar mass: 207.273 g·mol^{−1}
- 3D model (JSmol): Interactive image
- SMILES: COc1cc(C=C)c(cc1CCN)OC
- InChI: InChI=1S/C12H17NO2/c1-4-9-7-12(15-3)10(5-6-13)8-11(9)14-2/h4,7-8H,1,5-6,13H2,2-3H3; Key:LGLJOVNOGICITR-UHFFFAOYSA-N

2C-V, or 2C-VI, also known as 4-ethenyl-2,5-dimethoxyphenethylamine, is a recreational designer drug from the substituted phenethylamine family, with psychedelic effects. It was first synthesised by Daniel Trachsel and colleagues in 2006. It is active at a dosage of 25 mg orally with a duration of around 5 hours. It is a controlled substance in Canada under phenethylamine blanket-ban language.

== See also ==
- 2C (psychedelics)
- 2C-AL
- 2C-CP
- 2C-E
- 2C-YN
