= 1-Aminomethylindane =

Names
- Preferred IUPAC name 1-(2,3-Dihydro-1H-inden-1-yl)methanamine
- Other names 1-AMI

Identifiers
CAS Number	54949-92-7
3D model (JSmol)	Interactive image
ChEMBL	ChEMBL4569715
ChemSpider	11365763
EC Number	832-793-1
PubChem CID	14348692
CompTox Dashboard (EPA)	DTXSID80559228
- InChI: InChI=1S/C10H13N/c11-7-9-6-5-8-3-1-2-4-10(8)9/h1-4,9H,5-7,11H2 Key: QBHALBZXAXQBOY-UHFFFAOYSA-N
- SMILES: C1CC2=CC=CC=C2C1CN

Properties
Chemical formula	C_{10}H_{13}N
Molar mass	147.221 g·mol^{−1}

Hazards
- GHS labelling
Pictograms	(GHS05: Corrosive) (GHS07: Exclamation mark)
Signal word	Danger
Hazard statements	H302, H315, H318, H335
Precautionary statements	P261, P264, P264+P265, P270, P271, P280, P301+P317, P302+P352, P304+P340, P305+P354+P338, P317, P319, P321, P330, P332+P317, P362+P364, P403+P233, P405, P501
- Except where otherwise noted, data are given for materials in their standard state (at 25 °C [77 °F], 100 kPa). Infobox references

1-Aminomethylindane (1-AMI) is a chemical compound and derivative of indane. It can also be thought of as a cyclized phenethylamine or β-phenethylamine derivative in which the side chain is cyclized with the benzene ring. 1-AMI is the parent compound of a group of psychedelic- and entactogen-related drugs that includes 1-aminomethyl-5-methoxyindane (1-AMMI; related to para-methoxyamphetamine (PMA)), 2CB-Ind (related to 2C-B), jimscaline (related to mescaline), and bromojimscaline (related to 2-bromomescaline).

== See also ==
- Cyclized phenethylamine
- 2-Aminoindane
