= C21H26BrNO3 =

The molecular formula C_{21}H_{26}BrNO_{3} (molar mass: 420.347 g/mol) may refer to:

- DMBMPP
- 2C-B-3PIP-NBOMe
