= 3-Phenylpiperidine =

Clinical data
- ATC code: None

Identifiers
- IUPAC name: 3-phenylpiperidine
- CAS Number: 3973-62-4
- PubChem CID: 107207
- ChemSpider: 96476
- UNII: R748VYP4TP
- ChEMBL: ChEMBL1196278
- CompTox Dashboard (EPA): DTXSID30871048
- ECHA InfoCard: 100.021.458

Chemical and physical data
- Formula: C_{11}H_{15}N
- Molar mass: 161.248 g·mol^{−1}
- 3D model (JSmol): Interactive image
- SMILES: C1CC(CNC1)C2=CC=CC=C2
- InChI: InChI=1S/C11H15N/c1-2-5-10(6-3-1)11-7-4-8-12-9-11/h1-3,5-6,11-12H,4,7-9H2; Key:NZYBILDYPCVNMU-UHFFFAOYSA-N

3-Phenylpiperidine is a chemical compound and cyclized phenethylamine. It can be thought of as β-phenethylamine with a propyl group connecting the amine and the β position.

According to Daniel Trachsel and colleagues in 2013, the pharmacology of 3-phenylpiperidine itself has not been reported, only its chemical synthesis has been described. 3-Phenylpiperidine was first described in the scientific literature by 1933.

== Derivatives ==
3-Phenylpiperidine is a parent compound of several drugs such as the psychedelic and related drugs LPH-5 ((S)-2C-TFM-3PIP), 2C-B-3PIP, 2C-B-3PIP-NBOMe, 2C-B-3PIP-POMe, 2T-2CTFM-3PIP, and Z3517967757 (Z7757), the antipsychotic OSU-6162, and the sigma receptor agonist 3-PPP.

Chemical structures of selected 3-phenylpiperidines
3-Phenylpiperidine

3-PPP

Preclamol ((–)-3-PPP)

OSU-6162 (PNU-96391)

2C-B-3PIP

2C-B-3PIP-NBOMe

2C-B-3PIP-POMe

LPH-5 ((S)-2C-TFM-3PIP)

2T-2CTFM-3PIP

Z3517967757 (Z7757)

== See also ==
- Phenylpiperidines
- 4-Phenylpiperidine
- 2-Methyl-3-phenylpiperidine
- Phenmetrazine
- Substituted phenylmorpholine
- 1-Phenylpiperazine
- Partial ergoline
- SKF-89145
- SKF-89626
