= C12H16BrNO3 =

The molecular formula C_{12}H_{16}BrNO_{3} (molar mass : 302.168 g/mol) may refer to:

- 2C-B-morpholine
- Bromotomscaline
