= 2C-AL =

Chemical compound

Clinical data
- Other names: 4-Allyl-2,5-dimethoxyphenethylamine; 2,5-Dimethoxy-4-allylphenethylamine
- Routes of administration: Unknown
- Drug class: Serotonin receptor modulator; Serotonin 5-HT_{2A} receptor agonist; Serotonergic psychedelic; Hallucinogen

Pharmacokinetic data
- Duration of action: Unknown

Identifiers
- IUPAC name: 2-(2,5-dimethoxy-4-prop-2-enylphenyl)ethanamine
- CAS Number: 2756686-02-7
- PubChem CID: 162430125
- ChemSpider: 129432010
- UNII: DY8B23CT6A

Chemical and physical data
- Formula: C_{13}H_{19}NO_{2}
- Molar mass: 221.300 g·mol^{−1}
- 3D model (JSmol): Interactive image
- SMILES: COC1=CC(=C(C=C1CCN)OC)CC=C
- InChI: InChI=1S/C13H19NO2/c1-4-5-10-8-13(16-3)11(6-7-14)9-12(10)15-2/h4,8-9H,1,5-7,14H2,2-3H3; Key:QNVPDGCJKPQARD-UHFFFAOYSA-N

2C-AL, also known as 4-allyl-2,5-dimethoxyphenethylamine, is a drug from the substituted phenethylamine family which acts as an agonist of the 5-HT_{2A} receptor, with an EC_{50} of 2.15 nM at 5-HT_{2A} vs. 77.71 nM at 5-HT_{2B}, and produces a head-twitch response in animal studies. It was first discussed as a hypothetical compound in Daniel Trachsel's 2013 review of the field after his successful synthesis of the related compounds 2C-V and 2C-YN, and finally synthesised by a team at Gilgamesh Pharmaceuticals in 2020 using a different synthetic route from that employed by Trachsel. It is a controlled substance in Canada under phenethylamine blanket-ban language.

== See also ==
- 2C (psychedelics)
- 2C-CP
- 2C-IP
- 2C-P
- 2C-T-16
- 2C-T-TFM
- Allylescaline
- 3C-AL
