= C15H15N =

The molecular formula C_{15}H_{15}N (molar mass: 209.28 g/mol, exact mass: 209.1204 u) may refer to:

- 9-Aminomethyl-9,10-dihydroanthracene (AMDA)
- Centanafadine (EB-1020)
