= C15H15NO4 =

The molecular formula C_{15}H_{15}NO_{4} (molar mass: 273.28 g/mol) may refer to:

- Thyronine
- Zelandopam
