= 2CBecca =

Clinical data
- Drug class: Serotonin receptor modulator
- ATC code: None

Identifiers
- IUPAC name: 4-(4-bromo-2,5-dimethoxyphenyl)-1,2,3,4-tetrahydroisoquinoline

Chemical and physical data
- Formula: C_{17}H_{18}BrNO_{2}
- Molar mass: 348.240 g·mol^{−1}
- 3D model (JSmol): Interactive image
- SMILES: COc1cc(Br)c(cc1C1CNCc2c1cccc2)OC
- InChI: InChI=1S/C17H18BrNO2/c1-20-16-8-15(18)17(21-2)7-13(16)14-10-19-9-11-5-3-4-6-12(11)14/h3-8,14,19H,9-10H2,1-2H3; Key:LRHOKFHXSNZVLA-UHFFFAOYSA-N

2CBecca, also known as 4-(4-bromo-2,5-dimethoxyphenyl)-1,2,3,4-tetrahydroisoquinoline, is a serotonin receptor modulator of the phenethylamine, 2C, and N-benzylphenethylamine families. It is a cyclized phenethylamine analogue of the serotonergic psychedelic 25B-NBOMe in which the N-benzylethylamine side chain has been cyclized to form a tetrahydroisoquinoline ring. The drug shows affinity for the serotonin 5-HT_{2A} and 5-HT_{2C} receptors (K_{i} = 39–71 nM and 267–850 nM, respectively). 2CBecca was first described in the scientific literature by Michael Robert Braden of the lab of David E. Nichols at Purdue University in 2007.

== See also ==
- Substituted methoxyphenethylamine
- Cyclized phenethylamine
- 2C-B-3PIP
- LPH-5
- DEMPDHPCA-2C-D
- Z3517967757
- 2CJP
- 2CLisaB
- 2C-B-3PIP-NBOMe
- 2C-B-3PIP-POMe
