= C16H22N2O3 =

The molecular formula C_{16}H_{22}N_{2}O_{3} (molar mass: 290.363 g/mol) may refer to:

- Procaterol
- GYKI-13380
