= 2CLisaB =

Clinical data
- Drug class: Serotonin receptor modulator
- ATC code: None

Identifiers
- IUPAC name: 2-[2-(4-bromo-2,5-dimethoxyphenyl)ethyl]-1,2,3,4-tetrahydroisoquinoline

Chemical and physical data
- Formula: C_{19}H_{22}BrNO_{2}
- Molar mass: 376.294 g·mol^{−1}
- 3D model (JSmol): Interactive image
- SMILES: COc1cc(Br)c(cc1CCN1CCc2c(C1)cccc2)OC
- InChI: InChI=1S/C19H22BrNO2/c1-22-18-12-17(20)19(23-2)11-15(18)8-10-21-9-7-14-5-3-4-6-16(14)13-21/h3-6,11-12H,7-10,13H2,1-2H3; Key:FUQOBJZWVZVGDO-UHFFFAOYSA-N

2CLisaB, also known as 2-[2-(4-bromo-2,5-dimethoxyphenyl)ethyl]-1,2,3,4-tetrahydroisoquinoline, is a serotonin receptor modulator of the phenethylamine, 2C, and 25-NB families. It is a cyclized phenethylamine analogue of the serotonergic psychedelic 25B-NBOMe in which the N-benzyl group has been cyclized with the amine to form a tetrahydroisoquinoline ring. The drug shows affinity for the serotonin 5-HT_{2A} and 5-HT_{2C} receptors (K_{i} = 45–1,580 nM and 270–77,680 nM, respectively). 2CLisaB was first described in the scientific literature by Michael Robert Braden of the lab of David E. Nichols at Purdue University in 2007.

The compound without the 4-bromo substitution is known as 2CLisaH. It shows much lower affinities for the serotonin 5-HT_{2A} and 5-HT_{2C} receptors (K_{i} = 690–1,158 nM and 1,303–1,404 nM, respectively).

== See also ==
- Substituted methoxyphenethylamine
- Cyclized phenethylamine
- 25-NB
- 2CBecca
- 2CJP
- 2C-B-3PIP-NBOMe
- 2C-B-3PIP-POMe
