= SKF-89,145 =

Chemical compound

Identifiers
- IUPAC name: 4-(6-methyl-5,7-dihydro-4H-thieno[2,3-c]pyridin-4-yl)benzene-1,2-diol
- CAS Number: 79599-97-6
- PubChem CID: 10061214
- ChemSpider: 8236766
- ChEMBL: ChEMBL1591046
- CompTox Dashboard (EPA): DTXSID201017993

Chemical and physical data
- Formula: C_{14}H_{15}NO_{2}S
- Molar mass: 261.34 g·mol^{−1}
- 3D model (JSmol): Interactive image
- SMILES: Oc1ccc(cc1O)C2CN(C)Cc3sccc23
- InChI: InChI=1S/C14H15NO2S/c1-15-7-11(10-4-5-18-14(10)8-15)9-2-3-12(16)13(17)6-9/h2-6,11,16-17H,7-8H2,1H3; Key:SYHALWYYSDMSLE-UHFFFAOYSA-N

SKF-89,145 is a drug which acts as a dopamine agonist selective for the D_{1} subtype. The N-desmethyl derivative SKF-89,626 is also a selective D_{1} agonist with similar potency and selectivity to SKF 89,145.
