= 1-Aminomethyl-6-methoxytetralin =

AMMT

Clinical data
- Other names: AMMT
- Drug class: Serotonin reuptake inhibitor
- ATC code: None

Identifiers
- IUPAC name: (6-methoxy-1,2,3,4-tetrahydronaphthalen-1-yl)methanamine
- CAS Number: 88631-10-1
- PubChem CID: 10797800
- ChemSpider: 8973106

Chemical and physical data
- Formula: C_{12}H_{17}NO
- Molar mass: 191.274 g·mol^{−1}
- 3D model (JSmol): Interactive image
- SMILES: COC1=CC2=C(C=C1)C(CCC2)CN
- InChI: InChI=1S/C12H17NO/c1-14-11-5-6-12-9(7-11)3-2-4-10(12)8-13/h5-7,10H,2-4,8,13H2,1H3; Key:PWCAWOYQXQCEEV-UHFFFAOYSA-N

1-Aminomethyl-6-methoxytetralin (AMMT) is a serotonin reuptake inhibitor (SRI) of the phenethylamine family. It is a cyclized phenethylamine and is an analogue of 1-aminomethyl-5-methoxyindane (AMMI). The drug shows weak affinity for the human serotonin transporter (SERT) (K_{i} = 7,000–18,000 nM). AMMT was first described in the scientific literature by David Lance Roman and David E. Nichols and colleagues at Purdue University by 2004.

== See also ==
- Cyclized phenethylamine
- 1-Aminomethyl-5-methoxyindane (AMMI)
- 9-Aminomethyl-9,10-dihydroanthracene (AMDA)
- 2CB7 (2C-B-5-hemiFLY-β7)
