= 2C-B-3PIP-POMe =

Clinical data
- Drug class: Serotonin receptor modulator; Serotonin 5-HT_{2} receptor agonist; Serotonin 5-HT_{2A} receptor agonist
- ATC code: None

Identifiers
- IUPAC name: 5-(4-bromo-2,5-dimethoxyphenyl)-2-(2-methoxyphenyl)piperidine
- PubChem CID: 156735247

Chemical and physical data
- Formula: C_{20}H_{24}BrNO_{3}
- Molar mass: 406.320 g·mol^{−1}
- 3D model (JSmol): Interactive image
- SMILES: COC1=CC=CC=C1C2CCC(CN2)C3=CC(=C(C=C3OC)Br)OC
- InChI: InChI=1S/C20H24BrNO3/c1-23-18-7-5-4-6-14(18)17-9-8-13(12-22-17)15-10-20(25-3)16(21)11-19(15)24-2/h4-7,10-11,13,17,22H,8-9,12H2,1-3H3; Key:BDZXVOHNVCEDNQ-UHFFFAOYSA-N

2C-B-3PIP-POMe is a serotonin receptor modulator of the phenethylamine, 2C, 3-phenylpiperidine (3PIP), and NBOMe families. It is a cyclized phenethylamine and along with 2C-B-3PIP-NBOMe is an NBOMe derivative of 2C-B-3PIP. The drug is a mixture of cis- and trans- isomers. Its isomers show weak affinity for the serotonin 5-HT_{2A} and 5-HT_{2C} receptors (K_{i} = 290–856 nM and 3,850–23,200 nM, respectively), with these affinities being profoundly reduced relative to those of 2C-B. The cis isomer is a low-potency agonist of the serotonin 5-HT_{2A} receptor (EC_{50} = 480–2,300 nM; E_{max} = 87–94%), the serotonin 5-HT_{2B} receptor (EC_{50} = 770 nM; E_{max} = 20%), and the serotonin 5-HT_{2C} receptor (EC_{50} = 170–2,000 nM; E_{max} = 80–82%), whereas the trans isomer is inactive as an agonist of these receptors even at very high concentrations. The chemical synthesis of 2C-B-3PIP-POMe has been described. 2C-B-3PIP-POMe was first described in the scientific literature by Martin Hansen in 2010.

== See also ==
- Cyclized phenethylamine
- Substituted 3-phenylpiperidine
- Partial ergoline
- 2C-B-3PIP and 2C-B-3PIP-NBOMe
- 25B-NBOMe and DMBMPP (juncosamine)
- 2CBecca, 2CLisaB, and 2CJP
