= SpAMDA =

Clinical data
- Other names: Spiro[9,10-dihydroanthracene]-9,3'-pyrrolidine
- Drug class: Serotonin 5-HT_{2A} receptor antagonist
- ATC code: None

Identifiers
- IUPAC name: spiro[9H-anthracene-10,3'-pyrrolidine]
- PubChem CID: 10236153
- ChemSpider: 8411641
- ChEMBL: ChEMBL307956

Chemical and physical data
- Formula: C_{17}H_{17}N
- Molar mass: 235.330 g·mol^{−1}
- 3D model (JSmol): Interactive image
- SMILES: C1CNCC12C3=CC=CC=C3CC4=CC=CC=C24
- InChI: InChI=1S/C17H17N/c1-3-7-15-13(5-1)11-14-6-2-4-8-16(14)17(15)9-10-18-12-17/h1-8,18H,9-12H2; Key:LKSUTFUZSGZMOS-UHFFFAOYSA-N

SpAMDA, also known as spiro-AMDA or as spiro[9,10-dihydroanthracene]-9,3'-pyrrolidine, is a serotonin 5-HT_{2A} receptor antagonist of the phenethylamine family. It is a tricyclic and spiro cyclized phenethylamine and is an analogue of AMDA.

The drug shows high affinity for the serotonin 5-HT_{2A} receptor (K_{i} = 4 nM) and has 5-fold higher affinity than AMDA. Its A_{2} value for serotonin 5-HT_{2A} receptor antagonism is 79 nM. In addition to the serotonin 5-HT_{2A} receptor, SpAMDA shows 6-fold lower affinity for the serotonin 5-HT_{2C} receptor (K_{i} = 24 nM), but no affinity for several other targets, such as the dopamine D_{2} receptor among others.

The chemical synthesis of SpAMDA has been described. Various analogues of SpAMDA have been described.

SpAMDA was first described in the scientific literature by Richard Glennon and Bryan L. Roth and colleagues in 2003.

== See also ==
- Cyclized phenethylamine
- Serotonin 5-HT_{2A} receptor antagonist
- AMDA
