= Tomscaline =

Clinical data
- Other names: Tomscalin
- Drug class: Serotonin receptor modulator
- ATC code: None

Identifiers
- IUPAC name: 1-(2,3,4-trimethoxybicyclo[4.2.0]octa-1,3,5-trien-7-yl)methanamine
- CAS Number: 1132076-86-8
- ChemSpider: 29339459

Chemical and physical data
- Formula: C_{12}H_{17}NO_{3}
- Molar mass: 223.272 g·mol^{−1}
- 3D model (JSmol): Interactive image
- SMILES: NCC1Cc2c1cc(c(c2OC)OC)OC
- InChI: InChI=1S/C12H17NO3/c1-14-10-5-8-7(6-13)4-9(8)11(15-2)12(10)16-3/h5,7H,4,6,13H2,1-3H3; Key:SEXAFWMJJMOSAF-UHFFFAOYSA-N

Tomscaline is a serotonin 5-HT_{2} receptor modulator of the phenethylamine and scaline families related to TCB-2. It is a cyclized phenethylamine and derivative of the psychedelic drug mescaline where the side chain has been cyclized with the benzene ring to form a benzocyclobutene ring system.

== Pharmacology ==
=== Pharmacodynamics ===
Tomscaline shows affinity for the serotonin 5-HT_{2A}, 5-HT_{2C}, and 5-HT_{1A} receptors. Its affinities (K_{i}) were 111 nM for the serotonin 5-HT_{2A} receptor, 56 nM for the serotonin 5-HT_{2C} receptor, and 160 nM for the serotonin 5-HT_{1A} receptor. Compared to mescaline, tomscaline showed 3.3-fold higher affinity for the serotonin 5-HT_{2A} receptor, 6.8-fold higher affinity for the serotonin 5-HT_{2C} receptor, and 18.4-fold higher affinity for the serotonin 5-HT_{1A} receptor. Its functional activities at these serotonin receptors and its effects in animals and humans do not appear to have been studied.

== Chemistry ==
=== Analogues ===
Analogues of tomscaline include TCB-2, 2CBCB-NBOMe, jimscaline, and bromotomscaline, among others. Bromotomscaline, which is a derivative of tomscaline, shows dramatically or more than 10-fold higher affinities for the serotonin 5-HT_{2A} and 5-HT_{2C} receptors than tomscaline itself.

== History ==
Tomscaline was first described in the scientific literature by Daniel Trachsel and colleagues in their 2013 book Phenethylamine: von der Struktur zur Funktion (Phenethylamines: From Structure to Function). It was originally synthesized and studied by David E. Nichols and colleagues at Purdue University, who provided information about tomscaline to Trachsel and colleagues via personal communication in 2010.

== Society and culture ==
=== Legal status ===
==== Canada ====
Tomscaline is not a controlled substance in Canada as of 2025.

== See also ==
- Substituted methoxyphenethylamine
- Cyclized phenethylamine
- Scaline
