= GYKI-13380 =

Clinical data
- Other names: GYKI13380; LS-79445; LS79445
- Drug class: Phosphodiesterase inhibitor; Possible other actions; Appetite suppressant
- ATC code: None

Identifiers
- IUPAC name: 4-[(3-cyclopentyloxy-4-methoxyphenyl)methyl]imidazolidin-2-one
- CAS Number: 75614-09-4
- PubChem CID: 3058801
- ChemSpider: 2319890
- ChEMBL: ChEMBL423743
- CompTox Dashboard (EPA): DTXSID90997056

Chemical and physical data
- Formula: C_{16}H_{22}N_{2}O_{3}
- Molar mass: 290.363 g·mol^{−1}
- 3D model (JSmol): Interactive image
- SMILES: COC1=C(C=C(C=C1)CC2CNC(=O)N2)OC3CCCC3
- InChI: InChI=1S/C16H22N2O3/c1-20-14-7-6-11(8-12-10-17-16(19)18-12)9-15(14)21-13-4-2-3-5-13/h6-7,9,12-13H,2-5,8,10H2,1H3,(H2,17,18,19); Key:YOFWLAASFMHLAD-UHFFFAOYSA-N

GYKI-13380 is an experimental appetite suppressant of the phenethylamine and amphetamine families which was never marketed. It is a cyclized phenethylamine, with the amine and α position of the side chain cyclized into an imidazolidinone moiety.

The drug potently suppresses appetite in rodents. It does not produce psychostimulant effects in rats, is not self-administered in rats, and does not produce pulmonary hypertension in dogs or cats. Instead, mild sedation was reported at relatively high doses. Accordingly, GYKI-13380 did not substitute for dextroamphetamine in rodent drug discrimination tests. On the other hand however, it fully substituted for fenfluramine in rodent drug discrimination tests. It is unclear whether GYKI-13380 and fenfluramine act via common mechanisms of action. It is known that GYKI-13380 may act in part as a phosphodiesterase inhibitor, but other potential actions of the drug, such as on the serotonin system, have not been evaluated.

GYKI-13380 was first described in the literature in 1978 and was further described up to 1982. Subsequently, it was characterized and described in greater detail in 2022.

== See also ==
- Substituted methoxyphenethylamine
- Cyclized phenethylamine
- APA-01 (PharmAla-1)
