= 2CBCB-NBOMe =

Chemical compound

Clinical data
- Other names: NBOMe-2CBCB; NBOMe-TCB-2; TCB-2-NBOMe
- Drug class: Serotonin receptor modulator; Serotonin 5-HT_{2A} receptor agonist

Legal status
- Legal status: DE: NpSG (Industrial and scientific use only); UK: Class A

Identifiers
- IUPAC name: 1-(3-bromo-2,5-dimethoxy-7-bicyclo[4.2.0]octa-1(6),2,4-trienyl)-N-[(2-methoxyphenyl)methyl]methanamine
- CAS Number: 1354634-09-5
- PubChem CID: 76541806
- ChemSpider: 64880593
- UNII: WGI3S41A26
- CompTox Dashboard (EPA): DTXSID501028189

Chemical and physical data
- Formula: C_{19}H_{22}BrNO_{3}
- Molar mass: 392.293 g·mol^{−1}
- 3D model (JSmol): Interactive image
- SMILES: COC1=CC=CC=C1CNCC2CC3=C2C(=CC(=C3OC)Br)OC
- InChI: InChI=1S/C19H22BrNO3/c1-22-16-7-5-4-6-12(16)10-21-11-13-8-14-18(13)17(23-2)9-15(20)19(14)24-3/h4-7,9,13,21H,8,10-11H2,1-3H3; Key:CLSBQRBXTFTLEX-UHFFFAOYSA-N

2CBCB-NBOMe, or NBOMe-TCB-2, is a serotonin receptor modulator and cyclized phenethylamine. It is the NBOMe derivative of the psychedelic drug TCB-2 (2C-BCB).

== Pharmacology ==
=== Pharmacodynamics ===
2CBCB-NBOMe acts as a potent and selective agonist of the serotonin 5-HT_{2A} and 5-HT_{2C} receptors, with an affinity (K_{i}) of 0.27 nM at the human serotonin 5-HT_{2A} receptor, similar to that of other drugs such as TCB-2, 25I-NBOMe, and Bromo-DragonFLY.

== History ==
2CB2CB-NBOMe was first described in the scientific literature by the lab of David E. Nichols and colleagues in 2007. It was part of an ongoing research program focused on mapping of the specific amino acid residues responsible for ligand binding to the serotonin 5-HT_{2A} receptor.

== Society and culture ==
=== Legal status ===
==== Canada ====
2CBCB-NBOMe is not a controlled substance in Canada as of 2025.

==== United Kingdom ====
This substance is a Class A drug in the United Kingdom as a result of the N-benzylphenethylamine catch-all clause in the Misuse of Drugs Act 1971.

==== United States ====
2CBCB-NBOMe is a controlled substance in Vermont as of January 2016.

== See also ==
- Cyclized phenethylamine
- Jimscaline
- TCB-2
- Tomscaline
