= 2CJP =

Clinical data
- ATC code: None

Identifiers
- IUPAC name: 4-(4-bromo-2,5-dimethoxyphenyl)-2,3,4,5-tetrahydro-1H-2-benzazepine

Chemical and physical data
- Formula: C_{18}H_{20}BrNO_{2}
- Molar mass: 362.267 g·mol^{−1}
- 3D model (JSmol): Interactive image
- SMILES: COc1cc(Br)c(cc1C1CNCc2c(C1)cccc2)OC
- InChI: InChI=1S/C18H20BrNO2/c1-21-17-9-16(19)18(22-2)8-15(17)14-7-12-5-3-4-6-13(12)10-20-11-14/h3-6,8-9,14,20H,7,10-11H2,1-2H3; Key:FQAXYSXGRJQKMV-UHFFFAOYSA-N

2CJP, also known as 4-(4-bromo-2,5-dimethoxyphenyl)-2,3,4,5-tetrahydro-1H-2-benzazepine, is a serotonin receptor modulator of the phenethylamine, 2C, and N-benzylphenethylamine families. It is a cyclized phenethylamine analogue of 25B-NBOMe in which the N-benzylethylamine side chain has been cyclized to form a tetrahydrobenzazepine ring. The drug shows affinity for the serotonin 5-HT_{2A} and 5-HT_{2C} receptors (K_{i} = 19–457 nM and 227–3,240 nM, respectively). 2CJP was first described in the scientific literature by Michael Robert Braden of the lab of David E. Nichols at Purdue University in 2007.

== See also ==
- Substituted methoxyphenethylamine
- Cyclized phenethylamine
- 25-NB
- 2CBecca
- 2CLisaB
- 2C-B-3PIP-NBOMe
- 2C-B-3PIP-POMe
