= 2-Methyl-3-phenylpiperidine =

Names
- Preferred IUPAC name 2-Methyl-3-phenylpiperidine

Identifiers
CAS Number	70769-67-4
3D model (JSmol)	Interactive image
ChemSpider	14447455
PubChem CID	12501432
UNII	SPN2CP4NLJ
CompTox Dashboard (EPA)	DTXSID101045747
- InChI: InChI=1S/C12H17N/c1-10-12(8-5-9-13-10)11-6-3-2-4-7-11/h2-4,6-7,10,12-13H,5,8-9H2,1H3 Key: KSUHZKBRVSSLDY-UHFFFAOYSA-N
- SMILES: CC1C(CCCN1)C2=CC=CC=C2

Properties
Chemical formula	C_{12}H_{17}N
Molar mass	175.275 g·mol^{−1}
- Except where otherwise noted, data are given for materials in their standard state (at 25 °C [77 °F], 100 kPa). Infobox references

2-Methyl-3-phenylpiperidine is an intermediate in the preparation of 3-aminopiperidine substance P antagonists.

== See also ==
- 3-Phenylpiperidine
