= 2C-YN =

Chemical compound

Clinical data
- Other names: 4-Ethynyl-2,5-dimethoxyphenethylamine; 2,5-Dimethoxy-4-ethynylphenethylamine
- Routes of administration: Oral
- Drug class: Serotonergic psychedelic; Hallucinogen

Legal status
- Legal status: UK: Class A

Pharmacokinetic data
- Duration of action: ~2 hours

Identifiers
- IUPAC name: 2-(4-ethynyl-2,5-dimethoxyphenyl)ethanamine
- CAS Number: 752982-24-4 633290-73-0
- PubChem CID: 12063400
- ChemSpider: 26234934
- UNII: 5L67256F94
- CompTox Dashboard (EPA): DTXSID00476741

Chemical and physical data
- Formula: C_{12}H_{15}NO_{2}
- Molar mass: 205.257 g·mol^{−1}
- 3D model (JSmol): Interactive image
- SMILES: COc1cc(CCN)c(OC)cc1C#C
- InChI: InChI=1S/C12H15NO2/c1-4-9-7-12(15-3)10(5-6-13)8-11(9)14-2/h1,7-8H,5-6,13H2,2-3H3; Key:MLJHHYIJBZVUEA-UHFFFAOYSA-N

2C-YN, also known as 4-ethynyl-2,5-dimethoxyphenethylamine, is an analogue of phenethylamine that can be synthesized from 2C-I.

== Use and effects ==
Daniel Trachsel lists 2C-YN as having a dosage of around 50 mg orally and a duration of around 2 hours, with relatively mild psychedelic effects.

== Society and culture ==
=== Legal status ===
==== Canada ====
As of October 31st, 2016; 2C-YN is a controlled substance (Schedule III) in Canada.

==== United States ====
2C-YN is not an explicitly controlled substance in the United States. However, it could be considered a controlled substance under the Federal Analogue Act if intended for human consumption.

== See also ==
- 2C (psychedelics)
- 2C-AL
- 2C-E
- 2C-CP
- 2C-V
