= Caramiphen =

Chemical compound

Clinical data
- Trade names: Carafen
- ATC code: None

Identifiers
- IUPAC name: 2-(Diethylamino)ethyl 1-phenylcyclopentanecarboxylate
- CAS Number: 77-22-5
- PubChem CID: 6472
- ChemSpider: 6228
- UNII: 97J7NP0XJY
- ChEMBL: ChEMBL61946
- CompTox Dashboard (EPA): DTXSID0022729
- ECHA InfoCard: 100.000.922

Chemical and physical data
- Formula: C_{18}H_{27}NO_{2}
- Molar mass: 289.419 g·mol^{−1}
- 3D model (JSmol): Interactive image
- SMILES: O=C(OCCN(CC)CC)C2(c1ccccc1)CCCC2
- InChI: InChI=1S/C18H27NO2/c1-3-19(4-2)14-15-21-17(20)18(12-8-9-13-18)16-10-6-5-7-11-16/h5-7,10-11H,3-4,8-9,12-15H2,1-2H3; Key:OFAIGZWCDGNZGT-UHFFFAOYSA-N

Caramiphen is an anticholinergic drug used in the treatment of Parkinson's disease. In combination with phenylpropanolamine it is used as a cough suppressant and nasal decongestant to treat symptoms associated with respiratory illnesses such as cold, allergies, hay fever, and sinusitis. It was added to the British National Formulary in 1963, with a dosage of 10 to 20 mg. Side effects include nausea, dizziness, and drowsiness.

It binds to the sigma-1 receptor with an IC_{50} value of 25 nM.
