= Jimscaline =

Chemical compound

Clinical data
- Other names: C-(4,5,6-Trimethoxyindan-1-yl)methanamine
- Drug class: Serotonin receptor modulator; Serotonin 5-HT_{2A} receptor agonist; Serotonergic psychedelic; Hallucinogen
- ATC code: None

Legal status
- Legal status: In general: uncontrolled

Identifiers
- IUPAC name: (4,5,6-trimethoxy-2,3-dihydro-1H-inden-1-yl)methanamine
- CAS Number: 890309-51-0
- PubChem CID: 44413589
- ChemSpider: 21376014
- UNII: EN7Y5Y6S8F
- ChEMBL: ChEMBL211309
- CompTox Dashboard (EPA): DTXSID30470414

Chemical and physical data
- Formula: C_{13}H_{19}NO_{3}
- Molar mass: 237.299 g·mol^{−1}
- 3D model (JSmol): Interactive image
- SMILES: COC1=C(C(=C2CCC(C2=C1)CN)OC)OC
- InChI: InChI=1S/C13H19NO3/c1-15-11-6-10-8(7-14)4-5-9(10)12(16-2)13(11)17-3/h6,8H,4-5,7,14H2,1-3H3; Key:AFTIZGHFDCOQFS-UHFFFAOYSA-N

Jimscaline, also known as C-(4,5,6-trimethoxyindan-1-yl)methanamine, is a conformationally-restricted derivative of the cactus-derived psychedelic drug mescaline, which was reported in 2006 by a team at Purdue University led by David E. Nichols. It acts as a potent agonist for the serotonin 5-HT_{2A} and 5-HT_{2C} receptors with the more active (R)-enantiomer having an affinity (K_{i}) of 69 nM at the human serotonin 5-HT_{2A} receptor, and around three times the potency of mescaline in drug discrimination tests in animals. This discovery that the side chain of the psychedelic phenethylamines could be constrained to give chiral ligands with increased activity then led to the later development of the highly-potent benzocyclobutene derivative TCB-2. Jimscaline is not a controlled substance in Canada as of 2025.

(R)-Jimscaline.

== See also ==
- Scaline
- AMMI
- 2CB-Ind
- Mescaline
- Tomscaline
