= Enefexine =

Abandoned antidepressant

Clinical data
- Other names: 4-(4-Ethylphenyl)piperidine
- Drug class: Antidepressant
- ATC code: None

Identifiers
- IUPAC name: 4-(4-ethylphenyl)piperidine
- CAS Number: 67765-04-2 67765-33-7 (hydrochloride)
- PubChem CID: 208916
- ChemSpider: 181012
- UNII: 2JMM46GA2V
- ChEMBL: ChEMBL2106188
- CompTox Dashboard (EPA): DTXSID8057803

Chemical and physical data
- Formula: C_{13}H_{19}N
- Molar mass: 189.302 g·mol^{−1}
- 3D model (JSmol): Interactive image
- SMILES: CCC1=CC=C(C=C1)C2CCNCC2
- InChI: InChI=1S/C13H19N/c1-2-11-3-5-12(6-4-11)13-7-9-14-10-8-13/h3-6,13-14H,2,7-10H2,1H3; Key:NDPOGPAZKKPOPV-UHFFFAOYSA-N

Enefexine (INN), also known as 4-(4-ethylphenyl)piperidine, is a drug of the phenylpiperidine group which is described as an antidepressant but was never marketed. It was first described in the literature by 1983. The drug was developed by Ciba-Geigy.

== See also ==
- Budipine
- (+)-CPCA
- Femoxetine
- Gamfexine
- Paroxetine
