= 9-Aminomethyl-9,10-dihydroanthracene =

Chemical compound

AMDA

Clinical data
- Other names: 9-Aminomethyl-9,10-dihydroanthracene
- Drug class: Serotonin 5-HT_{2A} receptor antagonist
- ATC code: None

Identifiers
- IUPAC name: 1-(9,10-dihydroanthracen-9-yl)methanamine
- CAS Number: 22136-76-1
- PubChem CID: 10398175
- ChemSpider: 8573613
- UNII: JG5GX32FDE
- ChEMBL: ChEMBL47482
- CompTox Dashboard (EPA): DTXSID80439253

Chemical and physical data
- Formula: C_{15}H_{15}N
- Molar mass: 209.292 g·mol^{−1}
- 3D model (JSmol): Interactive image
- SMILES: c3cccc1c3Cc2ccccc2C1CN
- InChI: InChI=1S/C15H15N/c16-10-15-13-7-3-1-5-11(13)9-12-6-2-4-8-14(12)15/h1-8,15H,9-10,16H2; Key:GEICAQNIOJFRQN-UHFFFAOYSA-N

AMDA, also known as 9-aminomethyl-9,10-dihydroanthracene, is a tricyclic compound and cyclized phenethylamine which acts as a potent and selective antagonist for the 5-HT_{2A} receptor (K_{i} = 20 nM). It has been used to help study the shape of the 5-HT_{2A} protein, and develop a large family of related derivatives with even higher potency and/or selectivity.

AMDH structure.

Another related compound is AMDH, in which the central cyclohexane ring of AMDA has instead been expanded into a cycloheptane ring. As with AMDA, AMDH shows good affinity for the serotonin 5-HT_{2A} receptor (K_{i} = 112 nM).

== See also ==
- Cyclized phenethylamine
- Serotonin 5-HT_{2A} receptor antagonist
- SpAMDA
- 4-PhPr-PEA
- FLY (psychedelics)
- Atherosperminine
- AMMT
