= Phenylpiperidines =

Class of chemical compounds in which a phenyl group is directly attached to piperidine

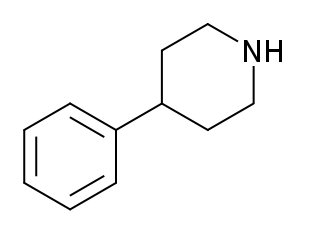
Chemical structure of 4-phenylpiperidine.

Phenylpiperidines are chemical compounds with a phenyl moiety directly attached to piperidine. Of particular interest are a variety of derivatives of 4-phenylpiperidine, which have pharmacological effects including morphine-like activity or other central nervous system effects.

4-Phenylpiperidine derivatives
Compound	N	4-position	3-position	4'-position	Type of pharmacology
MPPP	Me	Ph	H	–OCOEt	Opioid analgesic
Prodine	Me	Ph	Me	–OCOEt	Opioid analgesic
PEPAP	CH_{2}CH_{2}Ph	Ph	H	–OCOMe	Opioid analgesic
Pethidine	Me	Ph	H	–CO_{2}Et	Opioid analgesic with monoamine reuptake inhibitor activity
Budipine	t-Bu	Ph	H	Ph	Antiparkinsonian agent
Prodipine	iPr	Ph	H	Ph	Antiparkinsonian agent
Ketobemidone	Me	3-HO–Ph	H	–COEt	Opioid analgesic and NMDA receptor antagonist
Paroxetine	H	4-F–Ph	–CH_{2}OAr (Note: Ar denotes an aryl group; here specifically being benzodioxol-3-yl.)	H	Selective serotonin reuptake inhibitor
Enefexine	H	4-Et–Ph	H	H	Antidepressant
Femoxetine	Me	Ph	–CH_{2}O(4-MeOPh)	H	Selective serotonin reuptake inhibitor
CPCA	Me	4-Cl–Ph	–CO_{2}Me	H	Monoamine reuptake inhibitor

Some of the butyrophenone antipsychotics, including aceperone, bromperidol, haloperidol, moperone, and trifluperidol, as well as the related diphenylbutylpiperidine antipsychotic penfluridol, are also 4-phenylpiperidine derivatives.

Certain other opioids, including alvimopan, loperamide, and diphenoxylate, are 4-phenylpiperidine derivatives as well.

== See also ==
- 2-Phenylpiperidine
- 3-Phenylpiperidine
- Benzylpiperidine
- Phenylpiperazine
