= 2C-B-3PIP =

Clinical data
- Other names: 3-(4-Bromo-2,5-dimethoxyphenyl)piperidine; β,N-Trimethylene-2C-B
- Drug class: Serotonin receptor modulator; Serotonin 5-HT_{2A} receptor agonist
- ATC code: None

Identifiers
- IUPAC name: 3-(4-bromo-2,5-dimethoxyphenyl)piperidine
- CAS Number: 1282697-96-4
- PubChem CID: 82135182
- ChemSpider: 25749717

Chemical and physical data
- Formula: C_{13}H_{18}BrNO_{2}
- Molar mass: 300.196 g·mol^{−1}
- 3D model (JSmol): Interactive image
- SMILES: COC1=CC(=C(C=C1C2CCCNC2)OC)Br
- InChI: InChI=1S/C13H18BrNO2/c1-16-12-7-11(14)13(17-2)6-10(12)9-4-3-5-15-8-9/h6-7,9,15H,3-5,8H2,1-2H3; Key:ULJHXMHMDJQESG-UHFFFAOYSA-N

2C-B-3PIP, also known as 3-(4-bromo-2,5-dimethoxyphenyl)piperidine, is a serotonin receptor modulator of the phenethylamine, 2C, and 3-phenylpiperidine (3PIP) families related to the psychedelic drug LPH-5 ((S)-2C-TFM-3PIP). It is a cyclized phenethylamine and is the derivative of 2C-B in which the β position has been connected to the amine to form a piperidine ring.

== Pharmacology ==
=== Pharmacodynamics ===
The drug is a racemic mixture of (R)- and (S)- enantiomers. The eutomer or (S)- enantiomer is a serotonin 5-HT_{2A} receptor partial agonist with an EC_{50} of 69 nM and an E_{max} of 37%, whereas this enantiomer was inactive as an agonist of the serotonin 5-HT_{2C} receptor (EC_{50} = >50,000 nM) and instead showed low-potency antagonism at this receptor with an IC_{50} of 640 nM. The distomer or (R)- enantiomer is a serotonin 5-HT_{2A} receptor partial agonist with an EC_{50} of 370 nM and E_{max} of 67% as well as a serotonin 5-HT_{2C} receptor partial agonist with an EC_{50} of 1,900 nM and E_{max} of 34%. The enantiomers are both dramatically less potent as serotonin 5-HT_{2A} and 5-HT_{2C} receptor agonists than 2C-B, which had an EC_{50} (E_{max}) of 1.6 nM (68%) at the serotonin 5-HT_{2A} receptor and an EC_{50} (E_{max}) of 4.1 nM (74%) at the serotonin 5-HT_{2C} receptor. 2C-B-3PIP and its enantiomers were not assessed in animal behavioral studies and it is unknown whether they produce psychedelic-type effects.

== Chemistry ==
The chemical synthesis of 2C-B-3PIP has been described. Derivatives of 2C-B-3PIP include the NBOMe-like 2C-B-3PIP-NBOMe and 2C-B-3PIP-POMe. Some notable analogues of 2C-B-3PIP include 2C-B, LPH-5 ((S)-2C-TFM-3PIP), 2C-B-PYR, ZC-B (2C-B-AZET), 2C-B-morpholine (2C-B-MOR), 2C-B-aminorex (2C-B-AR), 2C-B-PP, and DMBMPP, among others.

== History ==
2C-B-3PIP was first described in the scientific literature by Martin Hansen in 2010. Its pharmacology was subsequently described by Emil Märcher-Rørsted and colleagues in association with Lophora in the 2020s. The closely related drug LPH-5, which is a selective serotonin 5-HT_{2A} receptor agonist and psychedelic drug, is under development by Lophora for the treatment of major depressive disorder.

== See also ==
- Cyclized phenethylamine
- Substituted 3-phenylpiperidine
- Partial ergoline
