= Bromotomscaline =

Clinical data
- Other names: Bromotomscalin; 5-Bromotomscaline
- Drug class: Serotonin receptor modulator; Serotonin 5-HT_{2} receptor modulator
- ATC code: None

Identifiers
- IUPAC name: 1-(5-bromo-2,3,4-trimethoxybicyclo[4.2.0]octa-1,3,5-trien-7-yl)methanamine

Chemical and physical data
- Formula: C_{12}H_{16}BrNO_{3}
- Molar mass: 302.168 g·mol^{−1}
- 3D model (JSmol): Interactive image
- SMILES: NCC1Cc2c1c(Br)c(c(c2OC)OC)OC
- InChI: InChI=1S/C12H16BrNO3/c1-15-10-7-4-6(5-14)8(7)9(13)11(16-2)12(10)17-3/h6H,4-5,14H2,1-3H3; Key:FGAILPHQFDPSQN-UHFFFAOYSA-N

Bromotomscaline, or 5-bromotomscaline, is a serotonin 5-HT_{2} receptor modulator of the phenethylamine and scaline families related to TCB-2. It is the 5-bromo derivative tomscaline, a cyclized phenethylamine analogue of mescaline with a benzocyclobutene ring system. Bromotomscaline shows more than 10-fold higher affinities for the serotonin 5-HT_{2A} and 5-HT_{2C} receptors than tomscaline. It was developed by David E. Nichols and colleagues at Purdue University and was subsequently reported by Daniel Trachsel in 2013, who obtained the information via personal communication with Nichols in 2010. It is not a controlled substance in Canada as of 2025.

== See also ==
- Substituted methoxyphenethylamine
- Cyclized phenethylamine
- Bromojimscaline
- 2-Bromomescaline
