= 2C-B-3PIP-NBOMe =

Clinical data
- Drug class: Serotonin receptor modulator
- ATC code: None

Identifiers
- IUPAC name: 3-(4-bromo-2,5-dimethoxyphenyl)-1-[(2-methoxyphenyl)methyl]piperidine

Chemical and physical data
- Formula: C_{21}H_{26}BrNO_{3}
- Molar mass: 420.347 g·mol^{−1}
- 3D model (JSmol): Interactive image
- SMILES: COc1cc(Br)c(cc1C1CCCN(C1)Cc1ccccc1OC)OC
- InChI: InChI=1S/C21H26BrNO3/c1-24-19-9-5-4-7-16(19)14-23-10-6-8-15(13-23)17-11-21(26-3)18(22)12-20(17)25-2/h4-5,7,9,11-12,15H,6,8,10,13-14H2,1-3H3; Key:XCBPFHGQWYIAJG-UHFFFAOYSA-N

2C-B-3PIP-NBOMe is a serotonin receptor modulator of the phenethylamine, 2C, 3-phenylpiperidine (3PIP), and NBOMe families. It is a cyclized phenethylamine and along with 2C-B-3PIP-POMe is an NBOMe derivative of 2C-B-3PIP. The drug shows very weak affinity for the serotonin 5-HT_{2A} and 5-HT_{2C} receptors (K_{i} = 2,150 nM and 5,880 nM, respectively), with its affinities being profoundly reduced relative to those of 2C-B. The chemical synthesis of 2C-B-3PIP-NBOMe has been described. 2C-B-3PIP-NBOMe was first described in the scientific literature by Martin Hansen in 2010.

== See also ==
- Cyclized phenethylamine
- Substituted 3-phenylpiperidine
- Partial ergoline
- 2C-B-3PIP and 2C-B-3PIP-POMe
- 25B-NBOMe and DMBMPP (juncosamine)
- 2CBecca, 2CLisaB, and 2CJP
