= S33005 =

Chemical compound

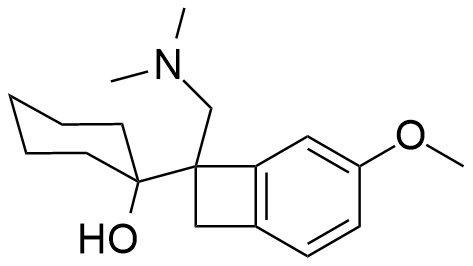

Clinical data
- Other names: (–)-1-(1-dimethylaminomethyl) 5-methoxybenzocyclobutan-1-yl) cyclohexanol

Identifiers
- IUPAC name: 1-[7-[(dimethylamino)methyl]-4-methoxy-7-bicyclo[4.2.0]octa-1(6),2, 4-trienyl]cyclohexan-1-ol
- CAS Number: 242473-60-5
- PubChem CID: 9925999
- ChemSpider: 8101634
- UNII: C53PYU3EBT
- CompTox Dashboard (EPA): DTXSID001030367

Chemical and physical data
- Formula: C_{18}H_{27}NO_{2}
- Molar mass: 289.419 g·mol^{−1}
- 3D model (JSmol): Interactive image
- SMILES: CN(C)CC1(CC2=C1C=C(C=C2)OC)C3(CCCCC3)O
- InChI: InChI=1S/C18H27NO2/c1-19(2)13-17(18(20)9-5-4-6-10-18)12-14-7-8-15(21-3)11-16(14)17/h7-8,11,20H,4-6,9-10,12-13H2,1-3H3; Key:UBIQMAFTTDZGEX-UHFFFAOYSA-N

S33005 is a serotonin–norepinephrine reuptake inhibitor (SNRI) that was under development by Servier for the treatment of depression and related disorders. It is structurally related to venlafaxine but has a more complex molecular structure. Venlafaxine appears to be a sigma modulator, but it is not known if S33005 shares this activity.

== Synthesis ==
"The 1-cyano-benzocyclobutenes used as starting material are obtained, for example, by subjecting a β-[orthohalogeno-phenyl]-propionitrile to intramolecular condensation in the presence of potassium amide, or by brominating a benzocyclobutene in position 1 with N-bromosuccinimide, followed by exchange of the bromine atom for a cyano group by means of sodium cyanide."

== See also ==
- Milnacipran
