= N-Methylnorcarfentanil =

Opioid analgesic

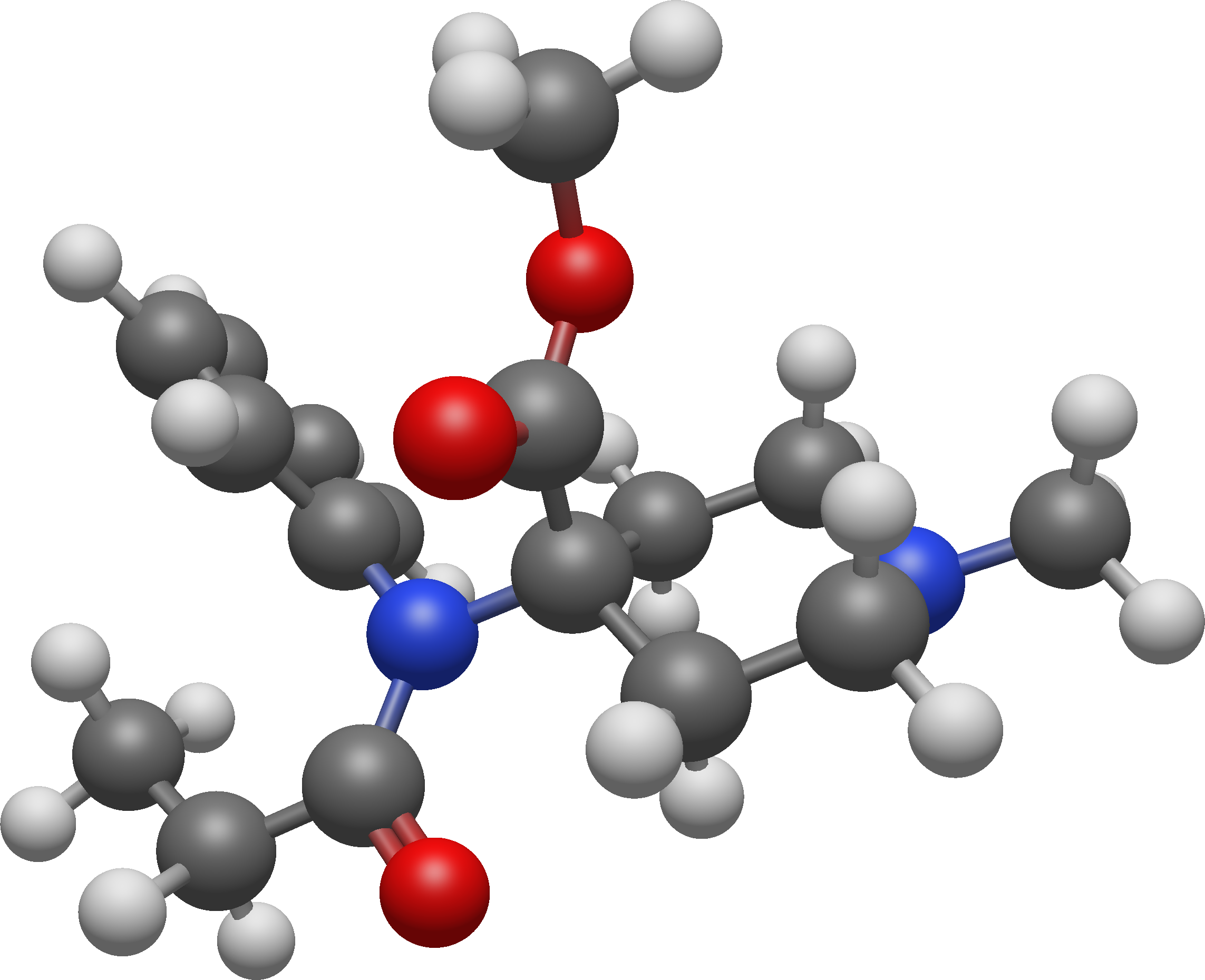

Legal status
- Legal status: CA: Schedule I; UK: Class A

Identifiers
- IUPAC name: methyl 1-methyl-4-(N-phenylpropanamido)piperidine-4-carboxylate
- CAS Number: 59708-50-8
- PubChem CID: 12298013
- ChemSpider: 26231037
- UNII: 85WEL251JZ
- CompTox Dashboard (EPA): DTXSID501029751

Chemical and physical data
- Formula: C_{17}H_{24}N_{2}O_{3}
- Molar mass: 304.390 g·mol^{−1}
- 3D model (JSmol): Interactive image
- SMILES: O=C(OC)C1(N(C2=CC=CC=C2)C(CC)=O)CCN(C)CC1
- InChI: InChI=1S/C17H24N2O3/c1-4-15(20)19(14-8-6-5-7-9-14)17(16(21)22-3)10-12-18(2)13-11-17/h5-9H,4,10-13H2,1-3H3; Key:KKEVIELPQLXPRR-UHFFFAOYSA-N

N-Methylnorcarfentanil (R-32395) is an opioid analgesic drug related to the highly potent animal tranquilizer carfentanil, but several thousand times weaker, being only slightly stronger than morphine. It was first synthesised by a team of chemists at Janssen Pharmaceutica led by Paul Janssen, who were investigating the structure-activity relationships of the fentanyl family of drugs. They found that replacing the phenethyl group attached to the piperidine nitrogen of fentanyl with a smaller methyl group made it so much weaker that it was inactive as an analgesic in animals. However the same change made to the more potent analogue carfentanil retained reasonable opioid receptor activity, reflecting the higher binding affinity produced by the 4-carbomethoxy group.

Side effects of fentanyl analogs are similar to those of fentanyl itself, which include itching, nausea and potentially serious respiratory depression, which can be life-threatening. Fentanyl analogs have killed hundreds of people throughout Europe and the former Soviet republics since the most recent resurgence in use began in Estonia in the early 2000s, and novel derivatives continue to appear.
