= N,N-Dimethyl-2-aminoindane =

Pharmaceutical compound

Clinical data
- Drug class: dopaminergic agent; cholinergic agent
- ATC code: none

Identifiers
- IUPAC name: N,N-Dimethyl-2,3-dihydro-1H-inden-2-amine
- CAS Number: 51864-45-0
- PubChem CID: 3016704
- ChemSpider: 2284609
- ChEMBL: ChEMBL1193475
- CompTox Dashboard (EPA): DTXSID40199826

Chemical and physical data
- Formula: C_{11}H_{15}N
- Molar mass: 161.248 g·mol^{−1}
- 3D model (JSmol): Interactive image
- SMILES: JHJKWSLLPQWCDF-UHFFFAOYSA-N
- InChI: InChI=1S/C11H15N/c1-12(2)11-7-9-5-3-4-6-10(9)8-11/h3-6,11H,7-8H2,1-2H3; Key:JHJKWSLLPQWCDF-UHFFFAOYSA-N

N,N-Dimethyl-2-aminoindane (NNDMAI) is a dopaminergic agent and a cholinergic agent.

== Pharmacology ==
=== Pharmacodynamics ===
NNDMAI exerts a nicotinic-like cholinergic effect, causing contractions of the ileum in in vitro testing of guinea pig samples.
