= APA-01 =

Clinical data
- Other names: APA01; APA-001; APA001; PharmAla-1; P-1; (R)-2-[(2H-1,3-benzodioxol-5-yl)methyl]pyrrolidine
- Drug class: Entactogen
- ATC code: None

Identifiers
- IUPAC name: (2R)-2-(1,3-benzodioxol-5-ylmethyl)pyrrolidine
- CAS Number: 35667-14-2 (racemic)
- PubChem CID: 94680847
- ChemSpider: 34501404

Chemical and physical data
- Formula: C_{12}H_{15}NO_{2}
- Molar mass: 205.257 g·mol^{−1}
- 3D model (JSmol): Interactive image
- SMILES: C1C[C@@H](NC1)CC2=CC3=C(C=C2)OCO3
- InChI: InChI=1S/C12H15NO2/c1-2-10(13-5-1)6-9-3-4-11-12(7-9)15-8-14-11/h3-4,7,10,13H,1-2,5-6,8H2/t10-/m1/s1; Key:IRWQJDYJIAIJSC-SNVBAGLBSA-N

APA-01, also known as PharmAla-1, is an entactogen of the phenethylamine, amphetamine, and MDxx families related to MDMA which is under development for potential medical use. It is a cyclized phenethylamine and is a derivative of MDMA in which the α position has been cyclized with the amine via a propyl group to form a pyrrolidine ring.

The drug is predicted to interact with the monoamine transporters and with the serotonin 5-HT_{2} receptors. In contrast to MDMA, it does not produce hyperthermia in rodents, instead producing dose-dependent hypothermia. In addition, unlike MDMA, neither APA-01 nor the corresponding (S)- enantiomer showed hyperlocomotion in rodents. Both APA-01 and the (S)- enantiomer produced sympathomimetic cardiovascular effects in rodents, but APA-01 had reduced impact compared to the (S)- enantiomer and relative to MDMA and dextromethamphetamine. APA-01 showed prosocial effects in rodents similarly to MDMA, but with greater potency. The drug is said to have improved safety compared to MDMA.

The chemical synthesis of APA-01 has been described.

APA-01 is under development by PharmAla Biotech. As of April 2026, it is in the preclinical research stage of development. Possible medical applications of APA-01 include treatment of post-traumatic stress disorder (PTSD) and neurological conditions like traumatic brain injury (TBI) and stroke. The drug was first described in the scientific literature, in a conference presentation, by 2024.

== See also ==
- Substituted methylenedioxyphenethylamine
- Cyclized phenethylamine
- List of investigational hallucinogens and entactogens
- GYKI-13380
- 2-Benzylpiperidine
- MDPPP
- Non-racemic MDMA (ALA-002)
