= 1-Aminomethyl-5-methoxyindane =

Chemical compound

AMMI

Clinical data
- Other names: AMMI
- Drug class: Selective serotonin releasing agent (SSRA); Possible entactogen
- ATC code: None

Legal status
- Legal status: In general: uncontrolled

Identifiers
- IUPAC name: (5-Methoxy-2,3-dihydro-1H-inden-1-yl)methanamine
- CAS Number: 691876-69-4 1415750-28-5 (hydrochloride)
- PubChem CID: 45091234
- ChemSpider: 24205063
- UNII: 585V6BDH9X
- CompTox Dashboard (EPA): DTXSID801029881

Chemical and physical data
- Formula: C_{11}H_{15}NO
- Molar mass: 177.247 g·mol^{−1}
- 3D model (JSmol): Interactive image
- SMILES: NCC1CCc2c1ccc(OC)c2
- InChI: InChI=1S/C11H15NO/c1-13-10-4-5-11-8(6-10)2-3-9(11)7-12/h4-6,9H,2-3,7,12H2,1H3; Key:WPBKCMLYKMDWRD-UHFFFAOYSA-N

1-Aminomethyl-5-methoxyindane (AMMI), is a drug developed by a team led by David E. Nichols at Purdue University, which acts as a selective serotonin releasing agent (SSRA) and binds to the serotonin transporter (SERT) with similar affinity relative to DFMDA (K_{i} = 2,000 nM).

== See also ==
- Cyclized phenethylamine
- 1-Aminomethylindane (1-AMI)
- 2CB-Ind
- 1-Aminomethyl-6-methoxytetralin (AMMT)
- para-Methoxyamphetamine (PMA)
