= Benzocyclobutene =

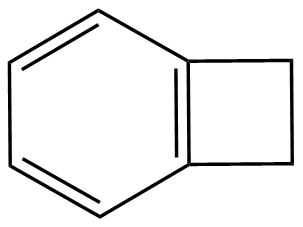

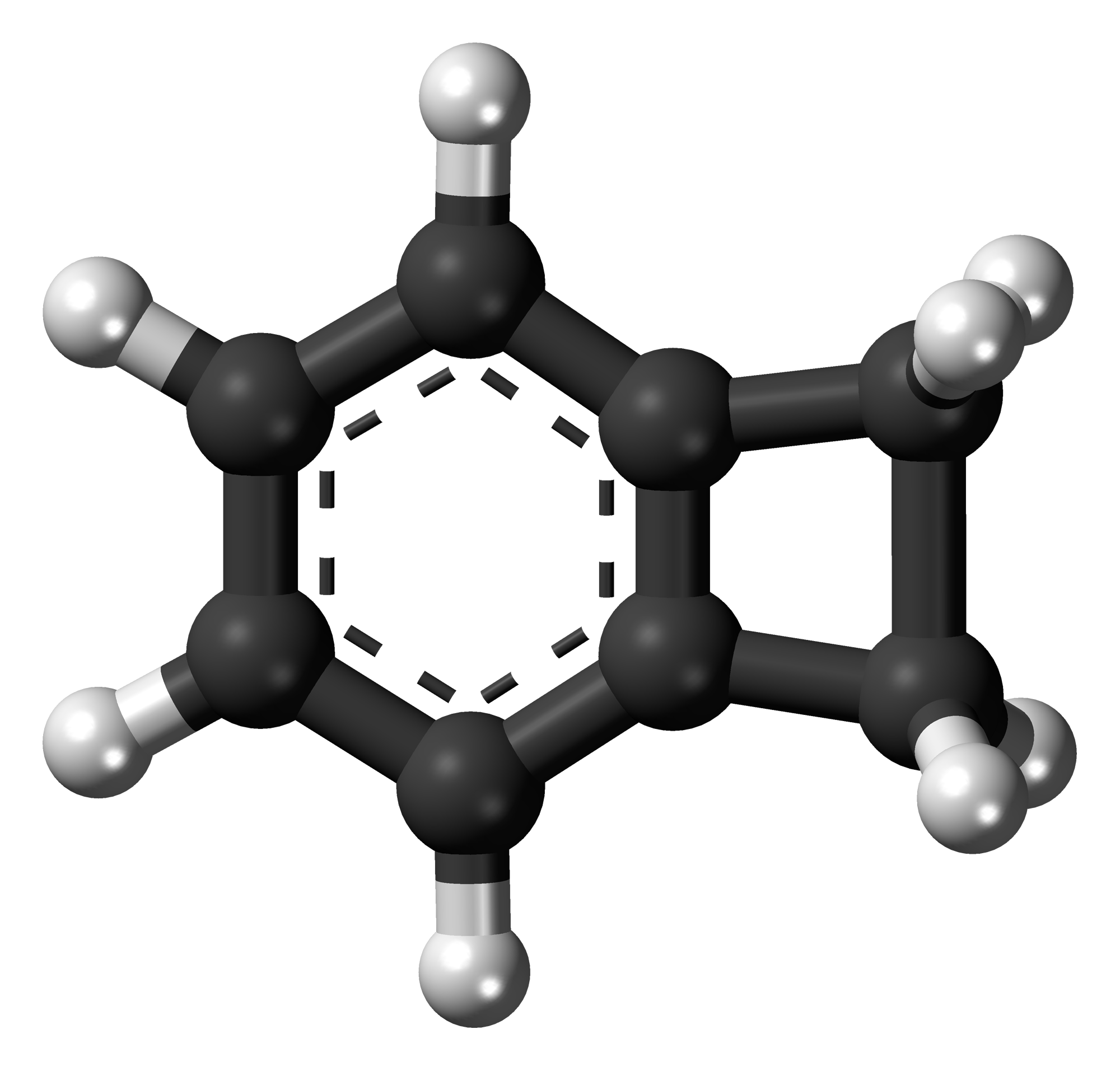

Names
- Preferred IUPAC name Bicyclo[4.2.0]octa-1,3,5-triene
- Other names Benzocyclobutane; BCB; Benzocyclobutene (not in accordance with IUPAC nomenclature)

Identifiers
CAS Number	694-87-1
3D model (JSmol)	Interactive image
ChEBI	CHEBI:87328
ChemSpider	62868
ECHA InfoCard	100.161.355
PubChem CID	69667
UNII	MF7U8F3YLB
CompTox Dashboard (EPA)	DTXSID3073927
- InChI: InChI=1S/C8H8/c1-2-4-8-6-5-7(8)3-1/h1-4H,5-6H2 Key: UMIVXZPTRXBADB-UHFFFAOYSA-N; InChI=1/C8H8/c1-2-4-8-6-5-7(8)3-1/h1-4H,5-6H2 Key: UMIVXZPTRXBADB-UHFFFAOYAR
- SMILES: C12=CC=CC=C1CC2

Properties
Chemical formula	C_{8}H_{8}
Molar mass	104.152 g·mol^{−1}
Density	0.957 g/cm^{3}
Boiling point	150 °C (302 °F; 423 K)
Refractive index (n_{D})	1.541
- Except where otherwise noted, data are given for materials in their standard state (at 25 °C [77 °F], 100 kPa). verify (what is ?) Infobox references

Benzocyclobutene (BCB) is a benzene ring fused to a cyclobutane ring. It has chemical formula C_{8}H_{8}.

BCB is frequently used to create photosensitive polymers. BCB-based polymer dielectrics may be spun on or applied to various substrates for use in Micro Electro-Mechanical Systems (MEMS) and microelectronics processing. Applications include wafer bonding, optical interconnects, low-κ dielectrics, or even intracortical neural implants.

== Reactions ==
Benzocyclobutene is a strained system which, upon heating to approximately 180 °C, causes the cyclobutene to undergo a conrotatory ring-opening reaction, forming o-xylylene. Since this process destroys the aromaticity of the benzene ring, the reverse reaction is highly favored.

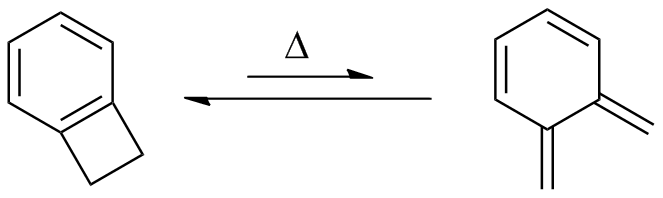
Thermal generation of o-xylylene from benzocyclobutene

o-Xylylenes generated in this way have been used prolifically in cycloaddition reactions, which restore the aromaticity to the benzene ring, while forming a new annulated species.

== Derivatives ==
Cyclized phenethylamine psychedelic drugs containing the benzocyclobutene ring system, including TCB-2, tomscaline, bromotomscaline, and 2CBCB-NBOMe (NBOMe-TCB-2), have been described. A benzocyclobutene-derived amphetamine has been patented as well, and a benzocyclobutene containing designer drug, the substituted cathinone derivative 3,4-EtPV, has been sold in Europe. The benzocyclobutene derivative 2C-G-2 has also been claimed in a patent as an antiinflammatory, but no synthesis or activity data is provided so it is unclear if it has actually been made.

The benzocyclobutene moiety also appears in the FDA approved medication ivabradine.

== See also ==
- Benzocyclobutadiene
