= SKF-89626 =

Clinical data
- Other names: SKF89626; SKF-89,626; SK&F-89626; SK&F-89,626
- Drug class: Dopamine D_{1} receptor agonist
- ATC code: None

Identifiers
- IUPAC name: 4-[(4S)-4,5,6,7-tetrahydrothieno[2,3-c]pyridin-4-yl]benzene-1,2-diol
- CAS Number: 79599-96-5
- PubChem CID: 6604005
- ChemSpider: 5036311
- ChEMBL: ChEMBL407489

Chemical and physical data
- Formula: C_{13}H_{13}NO_{2}S
- Molar mass: 247.31 g·mol^{−1}
- 3D model (JSmol): Interactive image
- SMILES: C1[C@H](C2=C(CN1)SC=C2)C3=CC(=C(C=C3)O)O
- InChI: InChI=1S/C13H13NO2S/c15-11-2-1-8(5-12(11)16)10-6-14-7-13-9(10)3-4-17-13/h1-5,10,14-16H,6-7H2/t10-/m0/s1; Key:QDKUSZZMIFQVPN-JTQLQIEISA-N

SKF-89626 is a highly selective full agonist of the dopamine D_{1} receptor of the thienopyridine family. However, the drug only weakly crosses the blood–brain barrier. SKF-89615 and SKF-89626 were the first selective and full-efficacy dopamine D_{1} receptor agonists to be discovered. They were first described in the scientific literature by David E. Nichols and colleagues in 1985.

== See also ==
- SKF-89,145
