= Zelandopam =

Abandoned D1-like receptor agonist

Clinical data
- Other names: Selandopam; (–)-(S)-7,8-Dihydroxy-4-(3,4-dihydroxyphenyl)-1,2,3,4-tetrahydroisoquinoline; 7,8-DDPTI; YM-435; YM435; MYD-37; MYD37
- Routes of administration: Intravenous administration
- Drug class: Dopamine D_{1}-like receptor agonists

Identifiers
- IUPAC name: (4S)-4-(3,4-dihydroxyphenyl)-1,2,3,4-tetrahydroisoquinoline-7,8-diol
- CAS Number: 139233-53-7 138086-00-7 (hydrochloride)
- PubChem CID: 3078105
- ChemSpider: 2336394
- UNII: IR6XYD8SAX
- ChEMBL: ChEMBL2105532
- CompTox Dashboard (EPA): DTXSID2048820

Chemical and physical data
- Formula: C_{15}H_{15}NO_{4}
- Molar mass: 273.288 g·mol^{−1}
- 3D model (JSmol): Interactive image
- SMILES: C1[C@H](C2=C(CN1)C(=C(C=C2)O)O)C3=CC(=C(C=C3)O)O
- InChI: InChI=1S/C15H15NO4/c17-12-3-1-8(5-14(12)19)10-6-16-7-11-9(10)2-4-13(18)15(11)20/h1-5,10,16-20H,6-7H2/t10-/m0/s1; Key:FULLEMQICAKPOE-JTQLQIEISA-N

Zelandopam (INN; developmental code names YM-435, MYD-37) is a selective dopamine D_{1}-like receptor agonist related to fenoldopam which was under development in Japan for the treatment of hypertension and heart failure but was never marketed. The drug was being developed for use by intravenous administration. The development of zelandopam appears to have been discontinued by the early 2000s. It was first described in the scientific literature by 1991.
