= Tilisolol =

Chemical compound

Clinical data
- AHFS/Drugs.com: International Drug Names
- Routes of administration: Oral
- ATC code: none

Legal status
- Legal status: In general: ℞ (Prescription only)

Identifiers
- IUPAC name: (RS)-4-[3-(tert-butylamino)-2-hydroxypropoxy]-2-methylisoquinolin-1-one
- CAS Number: 85136-71-6 62774-96-3 (hydrochloride)
- PubChem CID: 5474
- ChemSpider: 5275
- UNII: QUF41MF56G
- KEGG: D08598
- CompTox Dashboard (EPA): DTXSID0043846

Chemical and physical data
- Formula: C_{17}H_{24}N_{2}O_{3}
- Molar mass: 304.390 g·mol^{−1}
- 3D model (JSmol): Interactive image
- Chirality: Racemic mixture
- SMILES: CC(C)(C)NCC(COC1=CN(C(=O)C2=CC=CC=C21)C)O
- InChI: InChI=1S/C17H24N2O3/c1-17(2,3)18-9-12(20)11-22-15-10-19(4)16(21)14-8-6-5-7-13(14)15/h5-8,10,12,18,20H,9,11H2,1-4H3; Key:TWVUMMQUXMYOOH-UHFFFAOYSA-N

Tilisolol (INN, trade name Selecal) is a beta blocker.

== Synthesis ==
Thieme ChemDrug Synthesis: Patent: Precursor: Sino: HPLC:

The methanolysis of Phthalic anhydride [85-44-9] (1) gives Methyl hydrogen phthalate [4376-18-5] (2). Schotten-Baumann amidation with Methyl sarcosinate [5473-12-1] (3) gives Methyl 2-[(2-methoxy-2-oxoethyl)-methylcarbamoyl]benzoate, PC11644670 (4). Intramolecular lactamization with sodium methoxide afforded Methyl 4-hydroxy-2-methyl-1-oxoisoquinoline-3-carboxylate, PC54684295 (5). In lye saponification followed by decarboxylation occurred to give 4-hydroxy-2-methylisoquinolin-1(2H)-one [30236-50-1] (6). Treatment with Epichlorhydrin [106-89-8] (7) in the presence of base led to 2-Methyl-4-[(oxiran-2-yl)methoxy]isoquinolin-1(2H)-one [62775-08-0] (8). Opening of the oxirane ring with tert-Butylamine [75-64-9] (9) completed the synthesis of Tilisolol (10).
