= AC927 =

Chemical compound

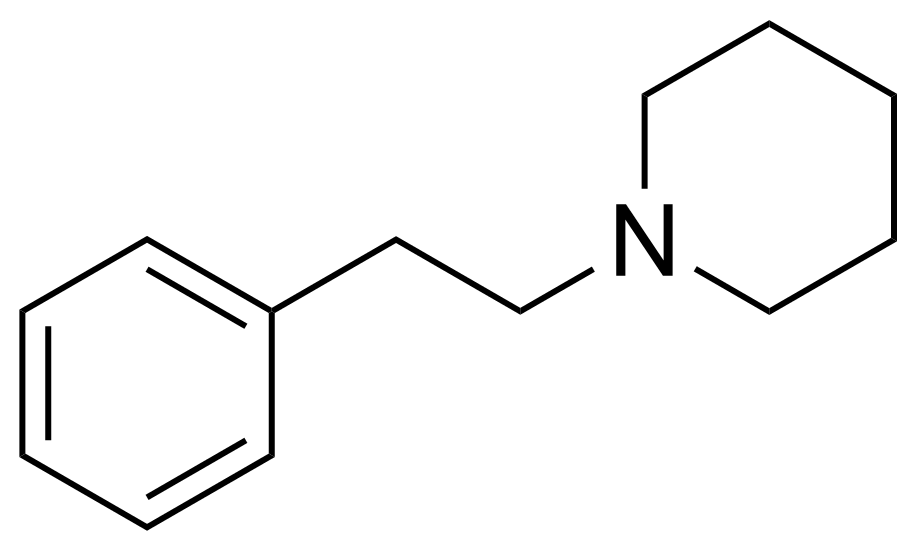

Clinical data
- Other names: 1-Phenethylpiperidine; pip-PEA; Phenylethylpiperidine

Identifiers
- IUPAC name: 1-(2-phenylethyl)piperidine or N-phenethyl-piperidine
- CAS Number: 332-14-9
- ChemSpider: 9141
- UNII: 5TY7C52M7F
- CompTox Dashboard (EPA): DTXSID5059822
- ECHA InfoCard: 100.005.785

Chemical and physical data
- Formula: C_{13}H_{19}N
- Molar mass: 189.302 g·mol^{−1}

AC927 or 1-(2-phenylethyl)piperidine is a selective sigma receptor antagonist, with reported binding affinity of K_{i} = 30 ± 2 nM for the sigma-1 receptor and K_{i} = 138 ± 18 nM for the sigma-2 receptor, and negligible binding affinity for other major central nervous system receptors, transporters, and ion channels.

AC927 is reported to attenuate the locomotor stimulation induced by methamphetamine in mice.
