= 4-Phenylpiperidine =

Names
- Preferred IUPAC name 4-Phenylpiperidine

Identifiers
CAS Number	771-99-3
3D model (JSmol)	Interactive image; Interactive image
ChEMBL	ChEMBL20969
ChemSpider	63068
ECHA InfoCard	100.011.130
PubChem CID	69873
UNII	8V8IM567WT
CompTox Dashboard (EPA)	DTXSID40227890
- InChI: InChI=1S/C11H15N/c1-2-4-10(5-3-1)11-6-8-12-9-7-11/h1-5,11-12H,6-9H2 Key: UTBULQCHEUWJNV-UHFFFAOYSA-N; InChI=1/C11H15N/c1-2-4-10(5-3-1)11-6-8-12-9-7-11/h1-5,11-12H,6-9H2 Key: UTBULQCHEUWJNV-UHFFFAOYAO
- SMILES: c1cc(ccc1)C2CCNCC2; c1ccc(cc1)C2CCNCC2

Properties
Chemical formula	C_{11}H_{15}N
Molar mass	161.248 g·mol^{−1}
- Except where otherwise noted, data are given for materials in their standard state (at 25 °C [77 °F], 100 kPa). verify (what is ?) Infobox references

4-Phenylpiperidine is a chemical compound. It features a benzene ring bound to a piperidine ring.

4-Phenylpiperidine is the base structure for a variety of opioids, such as pethidine (meperidine), ketobemidone, alvimopan, loperamide, and diphenoxylate.

== See also ==
- MPTP
- Phenylpiperidine
