= 25-NB =

Family of serotonergic psychedelics

25I-NBOMe, the most well-known 25-NB derivative.

The 25-NB (25x-NBx) series, or NBOMe series, also known as the N-benzylphenethylamines, is a family of serotonergic psychedelics. They are substituted phenethylamines and were derived from the 2C family. The most commonly encountered NBOMe drugs are 25I-NBOMe, 25B-NBOMe, and 25C-NBOMe.

The NBOMe drugs act as selective agonists of the serotonin 5-HT_{2} receptors. The 25-NB family is unique relative to other classes of psychedelics in that they are, generally speaking, extremely potent and quite selective for the 5-HT_{2} receptors.

Use of NBOMe series drugs has caused many deaths and hospitalisations since the drugs' popularisation in the 2010s. This is primarily due to their high potency, unpredictable pharmacokinetics, and sellers passing off the compounds in the series as LSD.

== Use and effects ==
The 25-NB drugs are inactive orally and instead are typically used sublingually, buccally, by insufflation, or sometimes via inhalation. They are typically employed at doses in the range of 50 to 1,500 μg, variable depending on the specific drug, and have durations in the range of 3 to 12 hours. The table below provides an overview of the major 25-NB drugs and their properties.

Conventionally, 25-NB have been known to be orally inactive due to extensive first-pass metabolism. However, an orally active N-benzylphenethylamine with an atypical chemical structure known as BMB-202 has since been identified and is under development for potential medical use. It is predicted to have a fast onset and a short duration of 1 to 2 hours in humans.

Doses and durations of 25-NB or NBOMe drugs
Compound	Chemical name	Dose	Duration
25B-NBOMe	N-(2-Methoxybenzyl)-4-bromo-2,5-dimethoxyphenethylamine	50–700+ μg	8–12 hours
25C-NBOMe	N-(2-Methoxybenzyl)-4-chloro-2,5-dimethoxyphenethylamine	50–1,250+ μg	3–10 hours
25D-NBOMe	N-(2-Methoxybenzyl)-4-methyl-2,5-dimethoxyphenethylamine	300–1,200+ μg	Unknown
25E-NBOMe	N-(2-Methoxybenzyl)-4-ethyl-2,5-dimethoxyphenethylamine	50–800 μg	5–10 hours
25H-NBOMe	N-(2-Methoxybenzyl)-2,5-dimethoxyphenethylamine	Unknown	Unknown
25I-NBOMe	N-(2-Methoxybenzyl)-4-iodo-2,5-dimethoxyphenethylamine	50–1,200 μg	4–10 hours
25N-NBOMe	N-(2-Methoxybenzyl)-4-nitro-2,5-dimethoxyphenethylamine	100–1,300+ μg	5–10 hours
25P-NBOMe	N-(2-Methoxybenzyl)-4-propyl-2,5-dimethoxyphenethylamine	100–1,500 μg	Unknown
25T2-NBOMe	N-(2-Methoxybenzyl)-4-ethylthio-2,5-dimethoxyphenethylamine	100–1,000 μg	Unknown
25T4-NBOMe	N-(2-Methoxybenzyl)-4-isopropylthio-2,5-dimethoxyphenethylamine	150–1,200 μg	Unknown
25T7-NBOMe	N-(2-Methoxybenzyl)-4-propylthio-2,5-dimethoxyphenethylamine	Unknown	Unknown
Notes: The route of administration is sublingual, insufflation, and/or buccal. They may also be smoked. NBOMe drugs have very low oral bioavailability. Refs:

== Toxicity and harm potential ==
NBOMe compounds are often associated with life-threatening toxicity and death. Studies on NBOMe family of compounds demonstrated that the substances exhibit neurotoxic and cardiotoxic activity. Reports of autonomic dysfunction remains prevalent with NBOMe compounds, with most individuals experiencing sympathomimetic toxicity such as vasoconstriction, hypertension and tachycardia in addition to hallucinations. Other symptoms of toxidrome include agitation or aggression, seizure, hyperthermia, diaphoresis, hypertonia, rhabdomyolysis, and death. Researchers report that NBOMe intoxication frequently display signs of serotonin syndrome. The likelihood of seizure is higher in NBOMes compared to other psychedelics.

NBOMe and NBOHs are regularly sold as LSD in blotter papers, which have a bitter taste and different safety profiles. Despite high potency, recreational doses of LSD have only produced low incidents of acute toxicity. Fatalities involved in NBOMe intoxication suggest that a significant number of individuals ingested the substance which they believed was LSD, and researchers report that "users familiar with LSD may have a false sense of security when ingesting NBOMe inadvertently". While most fatalities are due to the physical effects of the drug, there have also been reports of death due to self-harm and suicide under the influence of the substance.

Given limited documentation of NBOMe consumption, the long-term effects of the substance remain unknown. NBOMe compounds are not active orally, (Note: The potency of N-benzylphenethylamines via buccal, sublingual, or nasal absorption is 50- to 100-fold greater (by weight) than oral route compared to the parent 2C-x compounds. Researchers hypothesize the low oral metabolic stability of N-benzylphenethylamines is likely causing the low bioavailability on the oral route, although the metabolic profile of this compounds remains unpredictable; therefore researchers state that the fatalities linked to these substances may partly be explained by differences in the metabolism between individuals.) and are usually taken sublingually. When NBOMes are administered sublingually, numbness of the tongue and mouth followed by a metallic chemical taste was observed, and researchers describe this physical side effect as one of the main discriminants between NBOMe compounds and LSD.

=== Neurotoxic and cardiotoxic actions ===
Many of the NBOMe compounds have high potency agonist activity at additional 5-HT receptors and prolonged activation of 5-HT_{2B} can cause cardiac valvulopathy in high doses and chronic use. 5-HT_{2B} receptors have been strongly implicated in causing drug-induced valvular heart disease. The high affinity of NBOMe compounds for adrenergic α_{1} receptor has been reported to contribute to the stimulant-type cardiovascular effects.

In vitro studies, 25C-NBOMe has been shown to exhibit cytotoxicity on neuronal cell lines SH-SY5Y, PC12, and SN471, and the compound was more potent than methamphetamine at reducing the visibility of the respective cells; the neurotoxicity of the compound involves activation of MAPK/ERK cascade and inhibition of Akt/PKB signaling pathway. 25C-NBOMe, including the other derivative 25D-NBOMe, reduced the visibility of cardiomyocytes H9c2 cells, and both substances downregulated expression level of p21 (CDC24/RAC)-activated kinase 1 (PAK1), an enzyme with documented cardiac protective effects.

Preliminary studies on 25C-NBOMe have shown that the substance is toxic to development, heart health, and brain health in zebrafish, rats, and Artemia salina, a common organism for studying potential drug effects on humans, but more research is needed on the topic, the doses, and if the toxicology results apply to humans. Researchers of the study also recommended further investigation of the drug's potential in damaging pregnant women and their fetus due to the substance's damaging effects to development.

=== Emergency treatment ===
At present, there are no specific antidotes for NBOMes, and all acute intoxication is managed by symptomatic treatments, such as administration of benzodiazepines, antipsychotic drugs, and antiarrhythmic agents, such as beta blockers; some emergency interventions are intended to specifically treat rhabdomyolysis, which may lead to critical complications such as metabolic acidosis and acute kidney injury.

== Interactions ==
2C drugs like 2C-I are metabolized by the monoamine oxidase (MAO) enzymes, including both MAO-A and MAO-B. As a result, 2C drugs may be potentiated by monoamine oxidase inhibitors (MAOIs), such as phenelzine, tranylcypromine, moclobemide, and selegiline. This has the potential to lead to overdose and serious toxicity. In contrast to 2C drugs, 25I-NBOMe has been found not to be metabolized by MAO-A or MAO-B and instead only by cytochrome P450 enzymes. Other 25-NB drugs besides 25I-NBOMe were not assessed.

== Pharmacology ==
=== Pharmacodynamics ===
==== Actions ====
The NBOMe drugs are highly potent and selective agonists of the serotonin 5-HT_{2} receptors, including of the 5-HT_{2A}, 5-HT_{2B}, and 5-HT_{2C} receptors. However, they are much less potent and efficacious at the serotonin 5-HT_{2B} receptor compared to the serotonin 5-HT_{2A} and 5-HT_{2C} receptors. The drugs are highly selective for the serotonin 5-HT_{2} receptors over other serotonin receptors and over a variety of other biological targets. They are likewise inactive as monoamine reuptake inhibitors and releasing agents. Many of the NBOMe drugs are partial agonists of the rat and mouse trace amine-associated receptor 1 (TAAR1), but they are inactive as agonists of the human TAAR1.

==== Effects ====
In accordance with their psychedelic effects, NBOMe drugs induce the head-twitch response, a behavioral proxy of psychedelic effects, in rodents. They have also been found to produce hyperlocomotion at low doses and hypolocomotion at high doses in rodents.

Unlike most other serotonergic psychedelics, the NBOMe drugs 25B-NBOMe and 25N-NBOMe have been found to produce reinforcing effects in rodents, and hence may have misuse potential. Relatedly, 25B-NBOMe robustly increased dopamine levels in the nucleus accumbens similarly to methamphetamine. The reinforcing effects of 25B-NBOMe were not blocked by serotonin 5-HT_{2A} receptor antagonism, and it is unclear how they are produced. However, some NBOMe drugs, such as 25N-NBOMe, have been found to increase phosphorylation of the dopamine transporter (DAT) in the striatum similarly to methamphetamine in rodents. DAT phosphorylation is associated with dopamine reverse transport and efflux, which in turn increases extracellular dopamine levels.

Similarly to other psychedelics like DOI and 2C-T-7, tolerance has been found to gradually develop to the head-twitch response induced by 25I-NBOMe with chronic administration in rodents.

No human clinical data exist on the pharmacology of NBOMe derivatives as of 2020.

== Chemistry ==
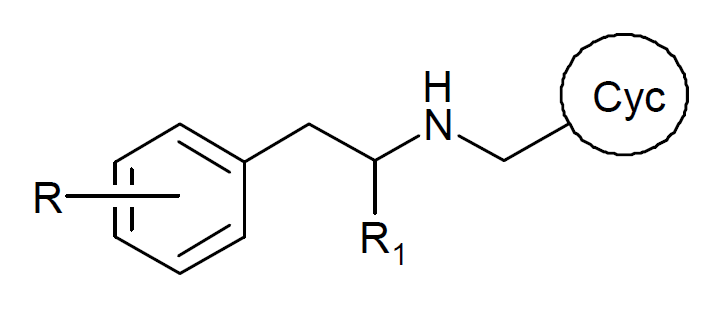
General structure of 25-NB derivatives, where R is usually 2,5-dimethoxy-4-(alkyl or halogen), R_{1} is usually H but rarely methyl, and Cyc is usually 2-substituted phenyl but can be other heterocycles.

The 25-NB compounds are mostly N-benzylphenethylamines, though in some cases the phenyl ring of the N-benzyl group is replaced by other heterocycles such as thiophene, pyridine, furan, tetrahydrofuran, benzodioxole or naphthalene, among others.

Generally speaking, they have methoxy groups at the 2 and 5 positions of the phenyl ring, a substitution such as a halogen or alkyl group at the 4 position of the phenyl ring, and a methoxy or other substitution (e.g., hydroxyl, fluoro) at the 2 position of the N-benzyl ring. More rarely, other substitution patterns may be present (see e.g. NBOMe-mescaline, 2,4,6-TMPEA-NBOMe, 25G-NBOMe, 2CBFly-NBOMe, 25C-NB3OMe). They differ from the 2C series by the presence of the N-benzyl moiety.

Rarely an alpha-methyl group is present making them N-benzyl amphetamines rather than N-benzyl phenethylamines, but this greatly reduces potency and activity. However in some cases where a side chain methyl group is cyclised back to the ring (e.g. in 2CBCB-NBOMe) or links the two alpha positions (e.g. in DMBMPP), this can improve selectivity for the 5-HT_{2A} receptor subtype.

== History ==
2C-B, the first major 2C drug and an analogue of mescaline, was first described by Alexander Shulgin in the 1970s. Richard Glennon and colleagues synthesized and described 25B-NB (N-benzyl-2C-B) along with a variety of other 25-NB derivatives in 1994. It was observed at the time that 25B-NB had slightly higher affinity for the serotonin 5-HT_{2A} receptor than 2C-B and that other 25-NB derivatives with substituents on the benzyl ring showed very high affinity for the receptor, though functional data were not reported.

N-Benzyl derivatives of the ketanserin-related quinazolinedione EZS-8, such as RH-34, were first described by Heinz Pertz, Sigurd Elz, and Ralf Heim by 1996 or 1998. NBOMe-mescaline and NBOMe-escaline were first described by Pertz and colleagues by 1999, while 25B-NBOMe was first described by Heim and colleagues in 1999. 25I-NBOMe and other 25-NB compounds such as 25TFM-NBOMe and 2CBFly-NBOMe were described by Heim and colleagues by 2000. 25I-NBOMe and other 25-NB drugs were subsequently further described by Heim in his dissertation in 2003. 25C-NBOMe was not described in the literature until 2010. The discovery of the 25-NB compounds by Heim and colleagues has been described by David E. Nichols as structurally remarkable, since N-alkylation of psychedelic phenethylamines, for instance Beatrice (N-methyl-DOM), has otherwise invariably abolished the hallucinogenic effects of this class of compounds.

The NBOMe drugs, primarily 25I-NBOMe, were encountered as novel recreational drugs by 2010, and by 2012 had eclipsed other psychedelics like LSD and psilocybin-containing mushrooms in popularity, at least for a time. Various NBOMes, such as 25I-NBOMe, became Schedule I controlled substances in the United States in 2013.

== Society and culture ==
=== Legal status ===
==== Canada ====
The 2C-NBOMe family are controlled substances in Canada.

==== United Kingdom ====
A large number of substances in the 25-NB class are Class A drugs in the United Kingdom as a result of the N-benzylphenethylamine catch-all clause in the Misuse of Drugs Act 1971 or are otherwise covered by the Psychoactive Substances Act 2016.

== List of 25-NB compounds ==
=== By chemical class ===
Group	Compounds
25x-NB	25B-NB • 25C-NB • 25I-NB
25x-NB3OMe	25B-NB3OMe • 25C-NB3OMe • 25D-NB3OMe • 25E-NB3OMe • 25H-NB3OMe • 25I-NB3OMe • 25N-NB3OMe • 25P-NB3OMe • 25T2-NB3OMe • 25T4-NB3OMe • 25T7-NB3OMe • 25TFM-NB3OMe
25x-NB4OMe	25B-NB4OMe • 25C-NB4OMe • 25D-NB4OMe • 25E-NB4OMe • 25H-NB4OMe • 25I-NB4OMe • 25N-NB4OMe • 25P-NB4OMe • 25T2-NB4OMe • 25T4-NB4OMe • 25T7-NB4OMe • 25TFM-NB4OMe
25x-NBF	25B-NBF • 25C-NBF • 25D-NBF • 25E-NBF • 25H-NBF • 25I-NBF • 25P-NBF • 25T2-NBF • 25T7-NBF • 25TFM-NBF
25x-NBOH	25B-NBOH • 25C-NBOH • 25CN-NBOH • 25D-NBOH • 25E-NBOH • 25F-NBOH • 25H-NBOH • 25I-NBOH • 25P-NBOH • 25T2-NBOH • 25T7-NBOH • 25TFM-NBOH
25x-NBOMe	25B-NBOMe • 25C-NBOMe • 25CN-NBOMe • 25D-NBOMe • 25E-NBOMe • 25F-NBOMe • 25G-NBOMe • 25H-NBOMe • 25I-NBOMe • 25iP-NBOMe • 25N-NBOMe • 25O-NBOMe • 25P-NBOMe • 25T-NBOMe • 25T2-NBOMe • 25T4-NBOMe • 25T7-NBOMe • 25TFM-NBOMe
25x-NBMD	25B-NBMD • 25C-NBMD • 25D-NBMD • 25E-NBMD • 25F-NBMD • 25H-NBMD • 25I-NBMD • 25P-NBMD • 25T2-NBMD • 25T7-NBMD • 25TFM-NBMD
Atypical 25-NB structures	2,4,6-TMPEA-NBOMe • 25B-N1POMe • 25B-NAcPip • 25B-NB23DM • 25B-NB25DM • 25C-NBCl • 25C-NBOEt • 25C-NBOiPr • 25I-N2Nap1OH • 25I-N3MT2M • 25I-N4MT3M • 25I-NB34MD • 25I-NBAm • 25I-NBBr • 25I-NBMeOH • 25I-NBTFM • 2C2-NBOMe • 2CBCB-NBOMe • 2CBFly-NBOMe 4-EA-NBOMe • 5-APB-NBOMe • 5MT-NBOMe • 5MT-NB3OMe • C30-NBOMe • DOB-NBOMe • DOI-NBOMe • DOM-NBOMe • FECIMBI-36 • MDPEA-NBOMe • NBOMe-escaline • NBOMe-mescaline (3,4,5-TMPEA-NBOMe) • PEA-NBOMe • ZDCM-04

=== By individual compound ===
This list includes notable compounds representative of most of the structural variations that have been explored in this series, but is by no means exhaustive. Many derivatives invented for scientific study into the structure-activity relationships of 5-HT_{2} receptor agonists have never appeared as designer drugs, while conversely some derivatives that have appeared as designer drugs are structurally novel and of unknown pharmacological activity (e.g. C30-NBOMe, 5-APB-NBOMe).

Structure	Name	Chemical name	CAS #	R	R_{1}	Cyc
	25B-NB	N-benzyl-1-(2,5-dimethoxy-4-bromophenyl)-2-aminoethane	155639-26-2	2,5-dimethoxy-4-bromo	H	phenyl
	25C-NB	N-benzyl-1-(2,5-dimethoxy-4-chlorophenyl)-2-aminoethane	1391487-65-2	2,5-dimethoxy-4-chloro	H	phenyl
	25I-NB	N-benzyl-1-(2,5-dimethoxy-4-iodophenyl)-2-aminoethane	919797-18-5	2,5-dimethoxy-4-iodo	H	phenyl
	25I-NMeTh	N-[(thiophen-2-yl)methyl]-1-(2,5-dimethoxy-4-iodophenyl)-2-aminoethane	1391499-03-8	2,5-dimethoxy-4-iodo	H	thiophen-2-yl
	25B-NMePyr	N-[(pyridin-2-yl)methyl]-1-(2,5-dimethoxy-4-bromophenyl)-2-aminoethane	1391499-21-0	2,5-dimethoxy-4-bromo	H	pyridin-2-yl
	25I-NMeFur	N-[(furan-2-yl)methyl]-1-(2,5-dimethoxy-4-iodophenyl)-2-aminoethane	1391498-93-3	2,5-dimethoxy-4-iodo	H	furan-2-yl
	25I-NMeTHF	N-[(tetrahydrofuran-2-yl)methyl]-1-(2,5-dimethoxy-4-iodophenyl)-2-aminoethane		2,5-dimethoxy-4-iodo	H	tetrahydrofuran-2-yl
	25B-NBF	N-(2-fluorobenzyl)-1-(2,5-dimethoxy-4-bromophenyl)-2-aminoethane	1539266-17-5	2,5-dimethoxy-4-bromo	H	2-fluorophenyl
	25B-NBOH	N-(2-hydroxybenzyl)-1-(2,5-dimethoxy-4-bromophenyl)-2-aminoethane	1335331-46-8	2,5-dimethoxy-4-bromo	H	2-hydroxyphenyl
	25B-NBOMe	N-(2-methoxybenzyl)-1-(2,5-dimethoxy-4-bromophenyl)-2-aminoethane	1026511-90-9	2,5-dimethoxy-4-bromo	H	2-methoxyphenyl
	25B-NB23DM	N-(2,3-dimethoxybenzyl)-1-(2,5-dimethoxy-4-bromophenyl)-2-aminoethane	1391493-68-7	2,5-dimethoxy-4-bromo	H	2,3-dimethoxyphenyl
	25B-NB25DM	N-(2,5-dimethoxybenzyl)-1-(2,5-dimethoxy-4-bromophenyl)-2-aminoethane		2,5-dimethoxy-4-bromo	H	2,5-dimethoxyphenyl
	25B-NMe7BF	N-[(benzofuran-7-yl)methyl]-1-(2,5-dimethoxy-4-bromophenyl)-2-aminoethane	1391492-46-8	2,5-dimethoxy-4-bromo	H	benzofuran-7-yl
	25B-NMe7DHBF	N-[(2,3-dihydrobenzofuran-7-yl)methyl]-1-(2,5-dimethoxy-4-bromophenyl)-2-aminoethane	1391492-40-2	2,5-dimethoxy-4-bromo	H	2,3-dihydrobenzofuran-7-yl
	25B-NMe7BT	N-[(benzothiophen-7-yl)methyl]-1-(2,5-dimethoxy-4-bromophenyl)-2-aminoethane	1391492-59-3	2,5-dimethoxy-4-bromo	H	benzothiophen-7-yl
	25B-NMe7Box	N-[(benzoxazol-7-yl)methyl]-1-(2,5-dimethoxy-4-bromophenyl)-2-aminoethane	1391498-73-9	2,5-dimethoxy-4-bromo	H	benzoxazol-7-yl
	25B-NMe7Ind	N-[(indol-7-yl)methyl]-1-(2,5-dimethoxy-4-bromophenyl)-2-aminoethane	1391498-28-4	2,5-dimethoxy-4-bromo	H	indol-7-yl
	25B-NMe7Indz	N-[(indazol-7-yl)methyl]-1-(2,5-dimethoxy-4-bromophenyl)-2-aminoethane	1391498-43-3	2,5-dimethoxy-4-bromo	H	indazol-7-yl
	25B-NMe7Bim	N-[(benzimidazol-7-yl)methyl]-1-(2,5-dimethoxy-4-bromophenyl)-2-aminoethane	1391498-62-6	2,5-dimethoxy-4-bromo	H	benzimidazol-7-yl
	FECIMBI-36	N-[(2-fluoroethoxy)benzyl]-1-(2,5-dimethoxy-4-bromophenyl)-2-aminoethane		2,5-dimethoxy-4-bromo	H	2-(2-fluoroethoxy)phenyl
	DOB-NBOMe	N-(2-methoxybenzyl)-1-(2,5-dimethoxy-4-bromophenyl)-2-aminopropane		2,5-dimethoxy-4-bromo	methyl	2-methoxyphenyl
	25C-NB3OMe	N-(3-methoxybenzyl)-1-(2,5-dimethoxy-4-chlorophenyl)-2-aminoethane	1566571-34-3	2,5-dimethoxy-4-chloro	H	3-methoxyphenyl
	25C-NB4OMe	N-(4-methoxybenzyl)-1-(2,5-dimethoxy-4-chlorophenyl)-2-aminoethane	1566571-35-4	2,5-dimethoxy-4-chloro	H	4-methoxyphenyl
	C30-NBOMe	N-(3,4,5-trimethoxybenzyl)-1-(2,5-dimethoxy-4-chlorophenyl)-2-aminoethane	1445574-98-0	2,5-dimethoxy-4-chloro	H	3,4,5-trimethoxyphenyl
	25C-NBF	N-(2-fluorobenzyl)-1-(2,5-dimethoxy-4-chlorophenyl)-2-aminoethane	1539266-21-1	2,5-dimethoxy-4-chloro	H	2-fluorophenyl
	25C-NBCl	N-(2-chlorobenzyl)-1-(2,5-dimethoxy-4-chlorophenyl)-2-aminoethane		2,5-dimethoxy-4-chloro	H	2-chlorophenyl
	25C-NBOH	N-(2-hydroxybenzyl)-1-(2,5-dimethoxy-4-chlorophenyl)-2-aminoethane	1391488-16-6	2,5-dimethoxy-4-chloro	H	2-hydroxyphenyl
	25C-NBOMe	N-(2-methoxybenzyl)-1-(2,5-dimethoxy-4-chlorophenyl)-2-aminoethane	1227608-02-7	2,5-dimethoxy-4-chloro	H	2-methoxyphenyl
	25C-NBOEt	N-(2-ethoxybenzyl)-1-(2,5-dimethoxy-4-chlorophenyl)-2-aminoethane		2,5-dimethoxy-4-chloro	H	2-ethoxyphenyl
	25C-NBOiPr	N-(2-isopropoxybenzyl)-1-(2,5-dimethoxy-4-chlorophenyl)-2-aminoethane		2,5-dimethoxy-4-chloro	H	2-isopropoxyphenyl
	25F-NBOMe	N-(2-methoxybenzyl)-1-(2,5-dimethoxy-4-fluorophenyl)-2-aminoethane	1373917-84-0	2,5-dimethoxy-4-fluoro	H	2-methoxyphenyl
	25CN-NBOH	N-(2-hydroxybenzyl)-1-(2,5-dimethoxy-4-cyanophenyl)-2-aminoethane	1539266-32-4	2,5-dimethoxy-4-cyano	H	2-hydroxyphenyl
	25CN-NBOMe	N-(2-methoxybenzyl)-1-(2,5-dimethoxy-4-cyanophenyl)-2-aminoethane	1354632-16-8	2,5-dimethoxy-4-cyano	H	2-methoxyphenyl
	25D-NBOMe	N-(2-methoxybenzyl)-1-(2,5-dimethoxy-4-methylphenyl)-2-aminoethane	1354632-02-2	2,5-dimethoxy-4-methyl	H	2-methoxyphenyl
	25D-NBOH	N-(2-hydroxybenzyl)-1-(2,5-dimethoxy-4-methylphenyl)-2-aminoethane	1391488-44-0	2,5-dimethoxy-4-methyl	H	2-hydroxyphenyl
	DOM-NBOMe	N-(2-methoxybenzyl)-4-methyl-2,5-dimethoxy-2-aminopropane	2836395-73-2	2,5-dimethoxy-4-methyl	methyl	2-methoxyphenyl
	25E-NBOMe	N-(2-methoxybenzyl)-1-(2,5-dimethoxy-4-ethylphenyl)-2-aminoethane	1354632-14-6	2,5-dimethoxy-4-ethyl	H	2-methoxyphenyl
	25E-NBOH	N-(2-hydroxybenzyl)-1-(2,5-dimethoxy-4-ethylphenyl)-2-aminoethane	1391489-79-4	2,5-dimethoxy-4-ethyl	H	2-hydroxyphenyl
	25G-NBOMe	N-(2-methoxybenzyl)-1-(2,5-dimethoxy-3,4-dimethylphenyl)-2-aminoethane	1354632-65-7	2,5-dimethoxy-3,4-dimethyl	H	2-methoxyphenyl
	25H-NBOMe	N-(2-methoxybenzyl)-1-(2,5-dimethoxyphenyl)-2-aminoethane	1566571-52-5	2,5-dimethoxy	H	2-methoxyphenyl
	25I-NB34MD	N-(3,4-methylenedioxybenzyl)-1-(2,5-dimethoxy-4-iodophenyl)-2-aminoethane	1391497-81-6	2,5-dimethoxy-4-iodo	H	3,4-methylenedioxyphenyl
	25I-NB3OMe	N-(3-methoxybenzyl)-1-(2,5-dimethoxy-4-iodophenyl)-2-aminoethane	1566571-40-1	2,5-dimethoxy-4-iodo	H	3-methoxyphenyl
	25I-NB4OMe	N-(4-methoxybenzyl)-1-(2,5-dimethoxy-4-iodophenyl)-2-aminoethane	1566571-41-2	2,5-dimethoxy-4-iodo	H	4-methoxyphenyl
	25I-NBF	N-(2-fluorobenzyl)-1-(2,5-dimethoxy-4-iodophenyl)-2-aminoethane	919797-21-0	2,5-dimethoxy-4-iodo	H	2-fluorophenyl
	25I-NBBr	N-(2-bromobenzyl)-1-(2,5-dimethoxy-4-iodophenyl)-2-aminoethane	1648649-98-2	2,5-dimethoxy-4-iodo	H	2-bromophenyl
	25I-NBTFM	N-[2-(trifluoromethyl)benzyl]-1-(2,5-dimethoxy-4-iodophenyl)-2-aminoethane		2,5-dimethoxy-4-iodo	H	2-(trifluoromethyl)phenyl
	25I-NBMD	N-(2,3-methylenedioxybenzyl)-1-(2,5-dimethoxy-4-iodophenyl)-2-aminoethane	919797-25-4	2,5-dimethoxy-4-iodo	H	2,3-methylenedioxyphenyl
	25B-NBMD	N-(2,3-methylenedioxybenzyl)-1-(2,5-dimethoxy-4-bromophenyl)-2-aminoethane	1354632-19-1	2,5-dimethoxy-4-bromo	H	2,3-methylenedioxyphenyl
	25C-NBMD	N-(2,3-methylenedioxybenzyl)-1-(2,5-dimethoxy-4-chlorophenyl)-2-aminoethane	1373879-26-5	2,5-dimethoxy-4-chloro	H	2,3-methylenedioxyphenyl
	25D-NBMD	N-(2,3-methylenedioxybenzyl)-1-(2,5-dimethoxy-4-methylphenyl)-2-aminoethane	1391488-97-3	2,5-dimethoxy-4-methyl	H	2,3-methylenedioxyphenyl
	25I-NBOH	N-(2-hydroxybenzyl)-1-(2,5-dimethoxy-4-iodophenyl)-2-aminoethane	919797-20-9	2,5-dimethoxy-4-iodo	H	2-hydroxyphenyl
	25I-NBOMe	N-(2-methoxybenzyl)-1-(2,5-dimethoxy-4-iodophenyl)-2-aminoethane	919797-19-6	2,5-dimethoxy-4-iodo	H	2-methoxyphenyl
	DOI-NBOMe	N-(2-methoxybenzyl)-1-(2,5-dimethoxy-4-iodophenyl)-2-aminopropane		2,5-dimethoxy-4-iodo	methyl	2-methoxyphenyl
	25I-NBMeOH	N-[2-(hydroxymethyl)benzyl]-1-(2,5-dimethoxy-4-iodophenyl)-2-aminoethane	1391494-71-5	2,5-dimethoxy-4-iodo	H	2-(hydroxymethyl)phenyl
	25I-NBAm	N-[2-(carbamoyl)benzyl]-1-(2,5-dimethoxy-4-iodophenyl)-2-aminoethane	1391494-85-1	2,5-dimethoxy-4-iodo	H	2-(carbamoyl)phenyl
	25I-NMe7DHBF	N-[(2,3-dihydrobenzofuran-7-yl)methyl]-1-(2,5-dimethoxy-4-iodophenyl)-2-aminoethane		2,5-dimethoxy-4-iodo	H	2,3-dihydrobenzofuran-7-yl
	25I-N2Nap1OH	N-[(1-hydroxynaphthalen-2-yl)methyl]-1-(2,5-dimethoxy-4-iodophenyl)-2-aminoethane		2,5-dimethoxy-4-iodo	H	1-hydroxynaphthalen-2-yl
	25I-N3MT2M	N-[(3-methoxythiophen-2-yl)methyl]-1-(2,5-dimethoxy-4-iodophenyl)-2-aminoethane	1354632-66-8	2,5-dimethoxy-4-iodo	H	3-methoxythiophen-2-yl
	25I-N4MT3M	N-[(4-methoxythiophen-3-yl)methyl]-1-(2,5-dimethoxy-4-iodophenyl)-2-aminoethane	1354632-73-7	2,5-dimethoxy-4-iodo	H	4-methoxythiophen-3-yl
	25iP-NBOMe	N-(2-methoxybenzyl)-1-(2,5-dimethoxy-4-isopropylphenyl)-2-aminoethane	1391487-83-4	2,5-dimethoxy-4-isopropyl	H	2-methoxyphenyl
	25N-NBOMe	N-(2-methoxybenzyl)-1-(2,5-dimethoxy-4-nitrophenyl)-2-aminoethane	1354632-03-3	2,5-dimethoxy-4-nitro	H	2-methoxyphenyl
	25N-NBOEt	N-(2-ethoxybenzyl)-1-(2,5-dimethoxy-4-nitrophenyl)-2-aminoethane		2,5-dimethoxy-4-nitro	H	2-ethoxyphenyl
	25N-NB-2-OH-3-Me	N-(2-hydroxy-3-methylbenzyl)-1-(2,5-dimethoxy-4-nitrophenyl)-2-aminoethane		2,5-dimethoxy-4-nitro	H	2-hydroxy-3-methylphenyl
	25N-NBOCF2H	N-(2-difluoromethoxybenzyl)-1-(2,5-dimethoxy-4-nitrophenyl)-2-aminoethane		2,5-dimethoxy-4-nitro	H	2-difluoromethoxyphenyl
	25N-NBPh	N-[(2-phenyl)benzyl]-1-(2,5-dimethoxy-4-nitrophenyl)-2-aminoethane		2,5-dimethoxy-4-nitro	H	o-biphenyl
	25N-N1-Nap	N-[(naphthalen-1-yl)methyl]-1-(2,5-dimethoxy-4-nitrophenyl)-2-aminoethane	2865185-31-3	2,5-dimethoxy-4-nitro	H	1-naphthyl
	25P-NBOMe	N-(2-methoxybenzyl)-1-(2,5-dimethoxy-4-propylphenyl)-2-aminoethane	1391489-07-8	2,5-dimethoxy-4-propyl	H	2-methoxyphenyl
	25P-NBOH	N-(2-hydroxybenzyl)-1-(2,5-dimethoxy-4-propylphenyl)-2-aminoethane	1391490-34-8	2,5-dimethoxy-4-propyl	H	2-hydroxyphenyl
	25TFM-NBOMe	N-(2-methoxybenzyl)-1-[2,5-dimethoxy-4-(trifluoromethyl)phenyl]-2-aminoethane	1027161-33-6	2,5-dimethoxy-4-(trifluoromethyl)	H	2-methoxyphenyl
	25O-NBOMe	N-(2-methoxybenzyl)-1-[2,5-dimethoxy-4-methoxyphenyl]-2-aminoethane	?	2,5-dimethoxy-4-methoxy	H	2-methoxyphenyl
	25O-NBcP	N-(2-cyclopropylbenzyl)-1-(2,4,5-trimethoxyphenyl)-2-aminoethane		2,4,5-trimethoxy	H	2-cyclopropylphenyl
	RS130-180	N-(2-propargyloxy)-2,5-dimethoxy-4-(dimethylamino)phenethylamine		4-(N,N-dimethylamino)	H	2-(prop-2-yn-1-yloxy)phenyl
	25T-NBOMe	N-(2-methoxybenzyl)-1-[2,5-dimethoxy-4-(methylthio)phenyl]-2-aminoethane	1539266-47-1	2,5-dimethoxy-4-(methylthio)	H	2-methoxyphenyl
	25T2-NBOMe	N-(2-methoxybenzyl)-1-[2,5-dimethoxy-4-(ethylthio)phenyl]-2-aminoethane	1539266-51-7	2,5-dimethoxy-4-(ethylthio)	H	2-methoxyphenyl
	25T4-NBOMe	N-(2-methoxybenzyl)-1-[2,5-dimethoxy-4-(isopropylthio)phenyl]-2-aminoethane	1354632-17-9	2,5-dimethoxy-4-(isopropylthio)	H	2-methoxyphenyl
	25T7-NBOMe	N-(2-methoxybenzyl)-1-[2,5-dimethoxy-4-(propylthio)phenyl]-2-aminoethane	1539266-55-1	2,5-dimethoxy-4-(propylthio)	H	2-methoxyphenyl
	25T7-NBOH	N-(2-hydroxybenzyl)-1-[2,5-dimethoxy-4-(propylthio)phenyl]-2-aminoethane	1354632-41-9	2,5-dimethoxy-4-(propylthio)	H	2-hydroxyphenyl
	25T-TFM-NCPM	N-cyclopropylmethyl-1-[2,5-dimethoxy-4-(trifluoromethylthio)phenyl]-2-aminoethane		2,5-dimethoxy-4-(trifluoromethylthio)	H	cyclopropylmethyl
	25MSIO-NBOMe	N-(2-methoxybenzyl)-1-[2,5-dimethoxy-4-(S-methanesulfonimidoyl)phenyl]-2-aminoethane		2,5-dimethoxy-4-(S-methanesulfonimidoyl)	H	2-methoxyphenyl
	25AM-NBOMe	N-(2-methoxybenzyl)-1-[2,5-dimethoxy-4-pentylphenyl]-2-aminoethane		2,5-dimethoxy-4-(n-pentyl)	H	2-methoxyphenyl
	NBOMe-mescaline	N-(2-methoxybenzyl)-1-(3,4,5-trimethoxyphenyl)-2-aminoethane	1354632-01-1	3,4,5-trimethoxy	H	2-methoxyphenyl
	NBOMe-escaline	N-(2-methoxybenzyl)-1-(3,5-dimethoxy-4-ethoxyphenyl)-2-aminoethane	1027079-85-1	3,5-dimethoxy-4-ethoxy	H	2-methoxyphenyl
	NBOMe-thiobuscaline	N-(2-methoxybenzyl)-1-(3,5-dimethoxy-4-butylthiophenyl)-2-aminoethane		3,5-dimethoxy-4-(n-butylthio)	H	2-methoxyphenyl
	2,4,6-TMPEA-NBOMe	N-(2-methoxybenzyl)-1-(2,4,6-trimethoxyphenyl)-2-aminoethane		2,4,6-trimethoxy	H	2-methoxyphenyl
	MDPEA-NBOMe	N-(2-methoxybenzyl)-1-(3,4-methylenedioxyphenyl)-2-aminoethane		3,4-methylenedioxy	H	2-methoxyphenyl
	Lophophine-NBOMe (MMDPEA-NBOMe)	N-(2-methoxybenzyl)-1-(3-methoxy-4,5-methylenedioxyphenyl)-2-aminoethane		3-methoxy-4,5-methylenedioxy	H	2-methoxyphenyl
	2C2-NBOMe (MMDPEA-2-NBOMe)	N-(2-methoxybenzyl)-1-(2-methoxy-4,5-methylenedioxyphenyl)-2-aminoethane		2-methoxy-4,5-methylenedioxy	H	2-methoxyphenyl
	MDBZ	N-benzyl-1-(3,4-methylenedioxyphenyl)-2-aminopropane	65033-29-6	3,4-methylenedioxy	methyl	phenyl
	Clobenzorex	N-(2-chlorobenzyl)-1-phenyl-2-aminopropane	13364-32-4	H	methyl	2-chlorophenyl
	4-EA-NBOMe	N-(2-methoxybenzyl)-1-(4-ethylphenyl)-2-aminopropane	2055108-04-6	4-ethyl	methyl	2-methoxyphenyl
	PEA-NBOMe	N-(2-methoxybenzyl)phenethylamine	3241-03-0	H	H	2-methoxyphenyl
	5-APB-NBOMe	N-(2-methoxybenzyl)-1-(benzofuran-5-yl)-2-aminopropane		benzofuran-5-yl instead of phenyl	methyl	2-methoxyphenyl

Additional naphthyl derivatives have also been described, such as 2C-T-N1-Nap.

==== Related compounds ====
Similar compounds with related structures are also known including:

Structure	Name	Chemical name	CAS #
	5-DM-25B-NBOMe	2-bromo-4-methoxy-5-(2-{[(2-methoxyphenyl)methyl]amino}ethyl)phenol	?
	25B-N1POMe	N-[1-(2-methoxyphenyl)ethyl]-2,5-dimethoxy-4-bromophenethylamine	1335331-49-1 (R); 1335331-51-5 (S)
	25CN-NαcPrBOH (Compound 7)	N-{[1-(2-hydroxyphenyl)-1-cyclopropyl]methyl}-2,5-dimethoxy-4-cyanophenethylamine	
	3-MeO-NBOMe (3-MPEA-NBOMe; 3-MeO-PEA-NBOMe)	N-(2-methoxybenzyl)-3-methoxyphenethylamine	1176460-16-4
	24H-NBOMe	N-(2-methoxybenzyl)-2,4-dimethoxyphenethylamine	?
	24H-NBF	N-(2-fluorobenzyl)-2,4-dimethoxyphenethylamine	?
	"Compound 109" in patent WO2023/130181 (see BMB-202)	N-(2-methylthiobenzyl)-2-hydroxy-4-cyanophenethylamine	
	"Compound 93" in patent WO2023/130181	N-(2-hydroxybenzyl)-2-methoxy-4-trifluoromethylphenethylamine	
	Compound 88	N-(2-chlorobenzyl)-2-methoxy-4-cyanophenethylamine	
	TGF-8027	N-[1-(2-hydroxyphenyl)ethyl]-2,5-dimethoxy-4-cyanophenethylamine	?
	2C-B-AN	2-phenyl-2-[2-(2,5-dimethoxy-4-bromophenyl)ethylamino]acetonitrile	
	25B-N(BOMe)2	2-(4-Bromo-2,5-dimethoxyphenyl)-N,N-bis(2-methoxybenzyl)ethan-1-amine	
	25CN-N3DHBF	4-(2-[(2,3-dihydro-1-benzofuran-3-yl)amino]ethyl)-2,5-dimethoxybenzonitrile	3035280-33-9
	25B-6DBFM2OH	N-[(2-hydroxydibenzo[b,d]furan)methyl]-2,5-dimethoxy-4-bromophenethylamine	
	2CBCB-NBOMe	N-[(3-bromo-2,5-dimethoxy-bicyclo[4,2,0]octa-1,3,5-trien-7-yl)methyl]-1-(2-methoxyphenyl)methanamine	1354634-09-5
	2CBFly-NBOMe	N-(2-methoxybenzyl)-1-(8-bromo-2,3,6,7-tetrahydrobenzo[1,2-b:4,5-b']difuran-4-yl)-2-aminoethane	1335331-42-4
	2C-B-FLY-NBOH	N-(2-hydroxybenzyl)-1-(8-bromo-2,3,6,7-tetrahydrobenzo[1,2-b:4,5-b']difuran-4-yl)-2-aminoethane	
	2C-B-DRAGONFLY-NBOH	N-(2-hydroxybenzyl)-1-(8-bromobenzo[1,2-b:4,5-b']difuran-4-yl)-2-aminoethane	1335331-45-7
	2C-B-FLY-NB2EtO5Cl	N-(2-ethoxy-5-chlorobenzyl)-1-(8-bromo-2,3,6,7-tetrahydrobenzo[1,2-b:4,5-b']difuran-4-yl)-2-aminoethane	
	DMBMPP (juncosamine)	(S,S)-2-(2,5-dimethoxy-4-bromobenzyl)-6-(2-methoxyphenyl)piperidine	1391499-52-7
	2CLisaB	2-[2-(4-bromo-2,5-dimethoxyphenyl)ethyl]-1,2,3,4-tetrahydroisoquinoline	
	2C-B-3PIP-NBOMe	3-(4-bromo-2,5-dimethoxyphenyl)-1-[(2-methoxyphenyl)methyl]piperidine	
	2C-B-3PIP-POMe	5-(4-bromo-2,5-dimethoxyphenyl)-2-(2-methoxyphenyl)piperidine	
	2CBecca	4-(4-bromo-2,5-dimethoxyphenyl)-1,2,3,4-tetrahydroisoquinoline	
	2CJP	4-(4-bromo-2,5-dimethoxyphenyl)-2,3,4,5-tetrahydro-1H-2-benzazepine	
	25D-NM-NDEAOP	3-[2-(2,5-dimethoxy-4-methylphenyl)ethyl-methylamino]-N,N-diethylpropanamide	
	25B-NAcPip	2-{[2-(4-bromo-2,5-dimethoxyphenyl)ethyl]amino}-1-(piperidin-1-yl)ethanone	
	ZDCM-04 (DOC-fenethylline)	1,3-dimethyl-7-{2-[1-(2,5-dimethoxy-4-chlorophenyl)propan-2-ylamino]ethyl}purine-2,6-dione	
	IHCH-2330		
	RH-34 (EZS-8-NBOMe)	3-[2-(2-methoxybenzylamino)ethyl]-1H-quinazoline-2,4-dione	1028307-48-3
	WL567	7-(2-{[(2-methoxyphenyl)methyl]amino}ethyl)quinolin-2(1H)-one	
	N-Benzyltryptamine (NBnT)	N-benzyltryptamine	15741-79-4
	4-HO-NBnT	4-Hydroxy-N-benzyltryptamine	
	5-MeO-NBnT	5-Methoxy-N-benzyltryptamine	25100-31-6
	T-NBOMe	N-(2-methoxybenzyl)tryptamine	418781-81-4
	5-MeO-T-NBOMe	N-(2-methoxybenzyl)-5-methoxytryptamine	1335331-37-7
	5MT-NB3OMe	N-(3-methoxybenzyl)-5-methoxytryptamine	1648553-42-7
	NEtPhOH-THPI	3-(1-(2-hydroxyphenylethyl)-1,2,3,6-tetrahydropyridin-5-yl)-1H-indole	
	NBOMe-LAD (LSD-NBOMe)	N,N-diethyl-6-[(2-methoxyphenyl)methyl]-9,10-didehydroergoline-8β-carboxamide	?
	PHENETH-LAD	N,N-Diethyl-6-(2-phenylethyl)-9,10-didehydroergoline-8β-carboxamide	?

== See also ==
- Substituted methoxyphenethylamine
- 4-Substituted 2,5-dimethoxyphenethylamines (2Cs)
- 4-Substituted 2,5-dimethoxyamphetamines (DOx)
- 4-Substituted 2,5-dimethoxy-α-ethylphenethylamines (4Cs)
- List of miscellaneous 5-HT_{2A} receptor agonists
