= 25C-NBOH =

Chemical compound

Clinical data
- Other names: 2C-C-NBOH; NBOH-2CC
- Routes of administration: Sublingual
- Drug class: Serotonergic psychedelic; Hallucinogen

Legal status
- Legal status: BR: Class F2 (Prohibited psychotropics); DE: NpSG (Industrial and scientific use only); UK: Class A

Pharmacokinetic data
- Onset of action: Up to 45 minutes

Identifiers
- IUPAC name: 2-({[2-(4-chloro-2,5-dimethoxyphenyl)ethyl]amino}methyl)phenol
- CAS Number: 1391488-16-6
- PubChem CID: 125181419
- ChemSpider: 58191432
- UNII: P8BP3X5EBR

Chemical and physical data
- Formula: C_{17}H_{20}ClNO_{3}
- Molar mass: 321.80 g·mol^{−1}
- 3D model (JSmol): Interactive image
- SMILES: COc1cc(Cl)c(OC)cc1CCNCc2ccccc2O
- InChI: InChI=1S/C17H20ClNO3/c1-21-16-10-14(18)17(22-2)9-12(16)7-8-19-11-13-5-3-4-6-15(13)20/h3-6,9-10,19-20H,7-8,11H2,1-2H3; Key:VHWXICYYQMMZCW-UHFFFAOYSA-N

25C-NBOH (2C-C-NBOH, NBOH-2CC) is a psychedelic drug and derivative of the phenethylamine derived hallucinogen 2C-C. It has similar serotonin receptor affinity to the better-known compound 25C-NBOMe. The drug has been encountered as a novel designer drug.

== Use and effects ==
25C-NBOH is said to have a dose of 100 to 750 μg sublingually and an onset of up to 45 minutes.

== Chemistry ==
=== Analogues and derivatives ===
- 25C-NBF
- 25C-NBMD
- 25C-NBOH
- 25C-NBOMe (NBOMe-2CC)
- 25C-NB3OMe
- 25C-NB4OMe
- 25I-NBOH
- 25B-NBOH
- 25E-NBOH
- 25H-NBOH

=== Analytical chemistry ===
25C-NBOH undergoes degradation under routine Gas Chromatography (GC) conditions, as well as other NBOH's substances, into 2C-C. An alternative method proposed for reliable identification of 25I-NBOH using GC/MS may be used for 25C-NBOH analysis.

== Society and culture ==
=== Legal status ===
==== Canada ====
25C-NBOH is a controlled substance in Canada under phenethylamine blanket-ban language.

==== United Kingdom ====
This substance is a Class A drug in the United Kingdom as a result of the N-benzylphenethylamine catch-all clause in the Misuse of Drugs Act 1971.

== See also ==
- 25-NB (psychedelics)
