= C18H22INO3 =

The molecular formula C_{18}H_{22}INO_{3} (molar mass: 427.277 g/mol, exact mass: 427.0644 u) may refer to:

- 25I-NB3OMe
- 25I-NB4OMe
- 25I-NBOMe
