= C18H22ClNO3 =

The molecular formula C_{18}H_{22}ClNO_{3} (molar mass: 335.83 g/mol, exact mass: 335.1288 u) may refer to:

- 25C-NB3OMe
- 25C-NB4OMe
- 25C-NBOMe
