= 25B-NB =

Chemical compound

Clinical data
- Other names: N-Benzyl-4-bromo-2,5-dimethoxyphenethylamine; N-Benzyl-2C-B; NB-2C-B
- Drug class: Serotonin 5-HT_{2} receptor agonist; Serotonergic psychedelic; Hallucinogen

Legal status
- Legal status: In general Unscheduled

Identifiers
- IUPAC name: N-benzyl-2-(4-bromo-2,5-dimethoxyphenyl)ethanamine
- CAS Number: 155639-26-2
- PubChem CID: 10360487
- ChemSpider: 8535936
- UNII: 2D6Q55542W
- ChEMBL: ChEMBL292692
- CompTox Dashboard (EPA): DTXSID701337023

Chemical and physical data
- Formula: C_{17}H_{20}BrNO_{2}
- Molar mass: 350.256 g·mol^{−1}
- 3D model (JSmol): Interactive image
- SMILES: COC1=CC(=C(C=C1CCNCC2=CC=CC=C2)OC)Br
- InChI: InChI=1S/C17H20BrNO2/c1-20-16-11-15(18)17(21-2)10-14(16)8-9-19-12-13-6-4-3-5-7-13/h3-7,10-11,19H,8-9,12H2,1-2H3; Key:XXLRSXIQVKHKPM-UHFFFAOYSA-N

25B-NB, also known as N-benzyl-4-bromo-2,5-dimethoxyphenethylamine (N-benzyl-2C-B or NB-2C-B), is a recreational designer drug from the 25-NB subgroup of the substituted phenethylamine family, with psychedelic effects. It has a binding affinity (K_{i}) of 16 nM at the serotonin receptor 5-HT_{2A} and 90 nM at 5-HT_{2C} and reportedly has a potency in between that of 2C-B and 25B-NBOMe (NBOMe-2C-B). 25B-NB was first synthesized and described by Richard Glennon and colleagues in 1994. It was the first drug of the 25-NB family to be developed. Subsequently, modification of 25B-NB led to the development of the more well-known 25-NB family drugs such as 25I-NBOMe. 25B-NB is a controlled substance in Canada under phenethylamine blanket-ban language.

== See also ==
- 25-NB
- N-Methyl-2C-B
- N-Ethyl-2C-B
- 25B-NBF
- 25B-NBOH
