= C18H20INO4 =

The molecular formula C_{18}H_{20}INO_{4} (molar mass: 441.260 g/mol, exact mass: 441.0437 u) may refer to:

- 25I-NB34MD (NB34MD-2C-I)
- 25I-NBMD
