= C21H27NO3 =

The molecular formula C_{21}H_{27}NO_{3} may refer to:

- Metamizil
- Propafenone
- 25O-NBcP
