= 25I =

25I may refer to any of the following novel phenethylamine compounds:

- 2C-I
- 25I-NBOMe (2C-I-NBOMe)
- 25I-NBOH
- 25I-NBF
- 25I-NBMD
