= C20H27NO3 =

The molecular formula C_{20}H_{27}NO_{3} (molar mass: 329.433 g/mol) may refer to:

- A-77636, a selective dopamine receptor D_{1} agonist
- 2C-E-NBOMe, a designer drug
- DOM-NBOMe
- 25G-NBOMe
- Tralkoxydim
- Trilostane, an inhibitor of 3 β-hydroxysteroid dehydrogenase used in the treatment of Cushing's syndrome
