= C20H26ClNO5 =

The molecular formula C_{20}H_{26}ClNO_{5} (molar mass: 395.88 g/mol) may refer to:

- Cloricromen
- C30-NBOMe
