= 2C2-NBOMe =

Chemical compound

Clinical data
- Other names: NBOMe-MMDPEA-2; MMDPEA-2-NBOMe; 2C-MMDA-2-NBOMe; 2C-2-NBOMe; N-(2-Methoxybenzyl)-2-methoxy-4,5-methylenedioxyphenethylamine
- Drug class: Serotonin 5-HT_{2} receptor agonist; Serotonergic psychedelic; Hallucinogen
- ATC code: None

Identifiers
- IUPAC name: N-(2-methoxybenzyl)-1-(2-methoxy-4,5-methylenedioxyphenyl)-2-aminoethane
- CAS Number: 3121586-74-8
- PubChem CID: 177841592

Chemical and physical data
- Formula: C_{18}H_{21}NO_{4}
- Molar mass: 315.369 g·mol^{−1}
- 3D model (JSmol): Interactive image
- SMILES: COc1ccccc1CNCCc1cc2OCOc2cc1OC
- InChI: InChI=1S/C18H21NO4/c1-20-15-6-4-3-5-14(15)11-19-8-7-13-9-17-18(23-12-22-17)10-16(13)21-2/h3-6,9-10,19H,7-8,11-12H2,1-2H3; Key:XPZZCRFMAACBFQ-UHFFFAOYSA-N

2C2-NBOMe, also known as 2C-MMDA-2-NBOMe or NBOMe-MMDPEA-2, is a phenethylamine derivative from the 25-NB (NBOMe) family. It is the NBOMe derivative of 2C-MMDA-2 (MMDPEA-2).

It acts as a potent agonist at the serotonin 5-HT_{2A} receptor with weaker activity at 5-HT_{2B} and 5-HT_{2C}, and produces a head-twitch response in animal studies which often correlates with potential for psychedelic effects in humans.

It is related in structure to psychedelic phenethylamine derivatives such as MMDA-2 and lophophine (MMDPEA) and is the first phenethylamine derivative with a methylenedioxy substitution on the phenyl ring but no alkyl substitution on the alpha carbon, that has been shown to produce psychedelic-appropriate responding in animals.

The drug was first described in the literature by Jason Wallach and colleagues in 2022 and 2023. It is a controlled substance in Canada under phenethylamine blanket-ban language. The drug is not an explicitly controlled substance in the United States, but could be considered a controlled substance under the Federal Analogue Act if intended for human consumption.

== See also ==
- Substituted methoxyphenethylamine
- 25-NB
- 25C-NBOMe (NBOMe-2C-C)
- DMMDA
- MMDA (drug)
- MDPEA
- NBOMe-mescaline
- 2,4,6-TMPEA-NBOMe
- 5-APB-NBOMe
