= 25I-NB34MD =

Derivative of the phenethylamine hallucinogen 2C-I

Clinical data
- Other names: NB34MD-2C-I
- ATC code: None

Legal status
- Legal status: UK: Class A

Identifiers
- IUPAC name: N-[(2H-1,3-benzodioxol-5-yl)methyl]-2-(4-iodo-2,5-dimethoxyphenyl)ethan-1-amine
- CAS Number: 1391497-81-6
- ChemSpider: 58191429
- UNII: R7X848UW5A

Chemical and physical data
- Formula: C_{18}H_{20}INO_{4}
- Molar mass: 441.265 g·mol^{−1}
- 3D model (JSmol): Interactive image
- SMILES: O1C2=C(OC1)C=C(C=C2)CNCCC3=C(C=C(C(=C3)OC)I)OC
- InChI: InChI=1S/C18H20INO4/c1-21-16-9-14(19)17(22-2)8-13(16)5-6-20-10-12-3-4-15-18(7-12)24-11-23-15/h3-4,7-9,20H,5-6,10-11H2,1-2H3; Key:FWEBGKDUEZRMRQ-UHFFFAOYSA-N

25I-NB34MD (NB34MD-2C-I) is a derivative of the phenethylamine hallucinogen 2C-I, which acts as a potent partial agonist for the human 5-HT_{2A} receptor, and presumably has similar properties to 2C-I. It has a binding affinity of 0.67nM at the human 5-HT_{2A} receptor, making it several times weaker than its positional isomer 25I-NBMD and a similar potency to 25I-NBF.

== Society and culture ==
=== Legal status ===
==== Hungary ====
Illegal.

==== Japan ====
Illegal.

==== Sweden ====
The Riksdag added 25I-NB34MD to Narcotic Drugs Punishments Act under Swedish schedule I ("substances, plant materials and fungi which normally do not have medical use") as of June 9, 2015, published by Medical Products Agency (MPA) in regulation LVFS 2015:4 listed as 25I-NB34MD, and 2-(4-jodo-2,5-dimetoxifenyl)-N-[(3,4-metylendioxifenyl)metyl]etanamin.

==== United Kingdom ====
This substance is a Class A drug in the United Kingdom as a result of the N-benzylphenethylamine catch-all clause in the Misuse of Drugs Act 1971.

== See also ==
- 25-NB (psychedelics)
