= 4-Ethylamphetamine =

Substituted amphetamine designer drug

Clinical data
- Other names: 4-EA
- ATC code: None

Legal status
- Legal status: UK: Under Psychoactive Substances Act

Identifiers
- IUPAC name: 1-(4-ethylphenyl)propan-2-amine
- CAS Number: 800400-50-4 (racemic) 1334811-39-0 ( (S) enantiomer)
- PubChem CID: 18070465
- ChemSpider: 16826008
- UNII: FKH92S67ZV
- CompTox Dashboard (EPA): DTXSID001028865

Chemical and physical data
- Formula: C_{11}H_{17}N
- Molar mass: 163.264 g·mol^{−1}
- 3D model (JSmol): Interactive image
- SMILES: CCC1=CC=C(C=C1)CC(C)N
- InChI: InChI=1S/C11H17N/c1-3-10-4-6-11(7-5-10)8-9(2)12/h4-7,9H,3,8,12H2,1-2H3; Key:VHFLVGIMDGXALR-UHFFFAOYSA-N

4-Ethylamphetamine (4-EA) is a substituted amphetamine derivative which has been sold as a designer drug. It is mainly known as a synthetic intermediate used as a building block to manufacture larger molecules, but 4-EA is closely related in chemical structure to designer drugs such as 4-methylamphetamine and 4-ethylmethcathinone, and is both a synthetic precursor and a metabolite of the 25-NB derivative 4-EA-NBOMe.

== See also ==
- Substituted amphetamine
- 25E-NBOMe
- 4-Et-PVP
- Amfepentorex
- DOET
- RTI-83
