= PEA-NBOMe =

Clinical data
- Other names: NBOMe; NBOMe-PEA; N-(2-Methoxybenzyl)phenethylamine
- ATC code: None

Identifiers
- IUPAC name: N-[(2-methoxyphenyl)methyl]-2-phenylethanamine
- CAS Number: 3241-03-0
- PubChem CID: 1618894
- ChemSpider: 1300700
- CompTox Dashboard (EPA): DTXSID00364619

Chemical and physical data
- Formula: C_{16}H_{19}NO
- Molar mass: 241.334 g·mol^{−1}
- 3D model (JSmol): Interactive image
- SMILES: COC1=CC=CC=C1CNCCC2=CC=CC=C2
- InChI: InChI=1S/C16H19NO/c1-18-16-10-6-5-9-15(16)13-17-12-11-14-7-3-2-4-8-14/h2-10,17H,11-13H2,1H3; Key:UTYSBUBGYZSUPZ-UHFFFAOYSA-N

PEA-NBOMe, also known as N-(2-methoxybenzyl)phenethylamine, is a drug of the phenethylamine and N-benzylphenethylamine (NB; NBOMe) families related to phenethylamine (PEA). It is the N-(2-methoxybenzyl) derivative of phenethylamine. The drug is a parent compound of the NBOMe family of psychedelic drugs, such as 25I-NBOMe. No data on the pharmacology or toxicity of PEA-NBOMe are available. In any case, based on structure–activity relationships, PEA-NBOMe might produce stimulant and/or hallucinogenic effects. The drug was encountered as a novel designer drug online in 2024. It is not a controlled substance in Canada as of 2025.

== See also ==
- Substituted phenethylamine
- 25-NB (psychedelics)
- Benzphetamine
- 4-EA-NBOMe
- Clobenzorex
- 25H-NBOMe
- PEA-NDEPA
- N-DEAOP-NMPEA
- 4-PhPr-PEA
