= DOB-NBOMe =

Clinical data
- Other names: NBOMe-DOB; N-(2-Methoxybenzyl)-4-bromo-2,5-dimethoxyamphetamine; 4-Bromo-2,5-dimethoxy-N-(2-methoxybenzyl)amphetamine
- Drug class: Serotonin 5-HT_{2A} receptor partial agonist; Possible serotonergic psychedelic or hallucinogen
- ATC code: None

Identifiers
- IUPAC name: 1-(4-bromo-2,5-dimethoxyphenyl)-N-[(2-methoxyphenyl)methyl]propan-2-amine
- CAS Number: 1335331-54-8
- PubChem CID: 169776410

Chemical and physical data
- Formula: C_{19}H_{24}BrNO_{3}
- Molar mass: 394.309 g·mol^{−1}
- 3D model (JSmol): Interactive image
- SMILES: COc1cc(Br)c(cc1CC(NCc1ccccc1OC)C)OC
- InChI: InChI=1S/C19H24BrNO3/c1-13(21-12-14-7-5-6-8-17(14)22-2)9-15-10-19(24-4)16(20)11-18(15)23-3/h5-8,10-11,13,21H,9,12H2,1-4H3; Key:VIURPEKIEYLSKF-UHFFFAOYSA-N

DOB-NBOMe, or NBOMe-DOB, also known as N-(2-methoxybenzyl)-4-bromo-2,5-dimethoxyamphetamine, is a serotonin 5-HT_{2A} receptor agonist and possible psychedelic drug of the phenethylamine, DOx, and 25-NB (NBOMe) families. It is the N-(2-methoxybenzyl) derivative of DOB and the amphetamine (i.e., α-methyl) analogue of 25B-NBOMe.

== Pharmacology ==
The drug is a potent serotonin 5-HT_{2A} receptor partial agonist, with an EC_{50} of 7.94 nM and an E_{max} of 20% in the employed assay. As an agonist of the serotonin 5-HT_{2A} receptor, DOB-NBOMe had about the same potency as DOB but had greatly reduced efficacy in comparison in vitro (with DOB having an EC_{50} of 10.2 nM and an E_{max} of 71%). Compared to 25B-NBOMe, the corresponding NBOMe analogue of 2C-B, DOB-NBOMe had about 30-fold lower potency as a serotonin 5-HT_{2A} receptor agonist and about half the activational efficacy. Whereas the potency of 2Cs can be dramatically increased by N-(2-methoxybenzyl) substitution, this has not been the case with the DOx series of psychedelics, where activity has been negatively impacted.

== History ==
DOB-NBOMe was first described in the scientific literature by Ralf Heim by 2003.

== See also ==
- DOI-NBOMe
- DOM-NBOMe
- DMBMPP
- 25-NB
- DOx
