= 4-Ethylmethcathinone =

Simulant designer drug and entactogen

Legal status
- Legal status: DE: Anlage I (Authorized scientific use only); UK: Class B

Identifiers
- IUPAC name: 1-(4-ethylphenyl)-2-(methylamino)propan-1-one
- CAS Number: 1225622-14-9
- PubChem CID: 71316576
- ChemSpider: 25630253
- UNII: 3I378P59DJ
- CompTox Dashboard (EPA): DTXSID401030383

Chemical and physical data
- Formula: C_{12}H_{17}NO
- Molar mass: 191.274 g·mol^{−1}
- 3D model (JSmol): Interactive image
- SMILES: C(C(C)NC)(=O)C1=CC=C(C=C1)CC
- InChI: InChI=1S/C12H17NO/c1-4-10-5-7-11(8-6-10)12(14)9(2)13-3/h5-9,13H,4H2,1-3H3; Key:FUYPDKFWOHBUFT-UHFFFAOYSA-N

4-Ethylmethcathinone (4-EMC) is a recreational designer drug of the stimulant and entactogen class. It is a structural isomer of 4-MEC and 3,4-DMMC. It has been identified in many countries around the world, initially in Europe but was first found in Australia in 2020.

== Legal status ==
In the United States 4-EMC is considered a Schedule I controlled substance as a positional isomer of 4-methylethcathinone (4-MEC).

4-Ethylmethcathinone is a controlled substance in the US state of Vermont as of January 2016. It is also covered by analogue provisions in many other jurisdictions.

== See also ==
- 4-Ethylamphetamine
- 4-Et-PVP
- RTI-83
