= 25T-NBOMe =

Clinical data
- Other names: 2C-T-NBOMe; NBOMe-2C-T; N-(2-Methoxybenzyl)-4-methylthio-2,5-dimethoxyphenethylamine
- Drug class: Serotonin 5-HT_{2} receptor agonist; Possible serotonergic psychedelic; Possible hallucinogen
- ATC code: None

Identifiers
- IUPAC name: 2-(2,5-dimethoxy-4-methylsulfanylphenyl)-N-[(2-methoxyphenyl)methyl]ethanamine
- CAS Number: 1391491-68-1
- PubChem CID: 124518722
- ChemSpider: 129557542
- CompTox Dashboard (EPA): DTXSID601344510

Chemical and physical data
- Formula: C_{19}H_{25}NO_{3}S
- Molar mass: 347.47 g·mol^{−1}
- 3D model (JSmol): Interactive image
- SMILES: COC1=CC=CC=C1CNCCC2=CC(=C(C=C2OC)SC)OC
- InChI: InChI=1S/C19H25NO3S/c1-21-16-8-6-5-7-15(16)13-20-10-9-14-11-18(23-3)19(24-4)12-17(14)22-2/h5-8,11-12,20H,9-10,13H2,1-4H3; Key:ZWPIZVVOKGWMFW-UHFFFAOYSA-N

25T-NBOMe, also known as 2C-T-NBOMe or NBOMe-2C-T as well as N-(2-methoxybenzyl)-4-methylthio-2,5-dimethoxyphenethylamine, is a serotonin 5-HT_{2} receptor agonist and possible serotonergic psychedelic of the phenethylamine, 2C, and 25-NB (NBOMe) families. It is the NBOMe (N-(2-methoxybenzyl)) derivative of 2C-T.

== Pharmacology ==
=== Pharmacodynamics ===
25T-NBOMe activities
Target	Affinity (K_{i}, nM)
5-HT_{1A}	ND
5-HT_{1B}	3,385
5-HT_{1D}	ND
5-HT_{1E}	ND
5-HT_{1F}	ND
5-HT_{2A}	0.54 (K_{i}); 2.0–4.2 (EC_{50}); 86–179% (E_{max})
5-HT_{2B}	0.91 (K_{i}); ND (EC_{50}); ND (E_{max})
5-HT_{2C}	7.4 (K_{i}) (rat); 21.4 (EC_{50}); 103% (E_{max})
5-HT_{3}	ND
5-HT_{4}	ND
5-HT_{5A}	ND
5-HT_{6}	117
5-HT_{7}	ND
α_{1A}–α_{1D}	ND
α_{2A}–α_{2C}	ND
β_{1}–β_{3}	ND
D_{1}–D_{5}	ND
H_{1}–H_{4}	ND
M_{1}–M_{5}	ND
I_{1}	ND
σ_{1}, σ_{2}	ND
ORs	ND
TAAR1	ND
SERT	ND (K_{i}); ND (IC_{50}); ND (EC_{50})
NET	ND (K_{i}); ND (IC_{50}); ND (EC_{50})
DAT	ND (K_{i}); ND (IC_{50}); ND (EC_{50})
Notes: The smaller the value, the more avidly the drug binds to the site. All proteins are human unless otherwise specified. Refs:

25T-NBOMe acts as a potent agonist of the serotonin 5-HT_{2A} and 5-HT_{2C} receptors and also shows interactions with certain other targets, such as the serotonin 5-HT_{2B} receptor.

== History ==
25T-NBOMe was first described in the scientific literature by 2010.

== Society and culture ==
=== Legal status ===
==== Canada ====
25T-NBOMe is a controlled substance in Canada under phenethylamine blanket-ban language.

== See also ==
- 25-NB
- 25T2-NBOMe
- 25T4-NBOMe
- 25T7-NBOMe
