= 2C-B-FLY-NBOH =

Clinical data
- Other names: NBOH-2C-B-FLY; 25B-FLY-NBOH
- Drug class: Serotonin receptor modulator; 5-HT_{2A} receptor agonist; putative psychedelic
- ATC code: None

Identifiers
- IUPAC name: 2-({[2-(8-Bromo-2,3,6,7-tetrahydrobenzo[1,2-b:4,5-b′]difuran-4-yl)ethyl]amino}methyl)phenol
- PubChem CID: 177500739

Chemical and physical data
- Formula: C_{19}H_{20}BrNO_{3}
- Molar mass: 390.277 g·mol^{−1}
- 3D model (JSmol): Interactive image
- SMILES: C1COC2=C(C3=C(C(=C21)CCNCC4=CC=CC=C4O)OCC3)Br
- InChI: InChI=1S/C19H20BrNO3/c20-17-15-7-10-23-18(15)13(14-6-9-24-19(14)17)5-8-21-11-12-3-1-2-4-16(12)22/h1-4,21-22H,5-11H; Key:JOZZRHOKSVYSOI-UHFFFAOYSA-N

2C-B-FLY-NBOH it is a putative psychedelic drug from the FLY family and, to some extent, 25x-NBOH (part of the 25-NB family); it is a potent serotonin 5-HT_{2A} receptor agonist but exhibits a weak biological response.

== Pharmacology ==
=== Pharmacodynamics ===
2C-B-FLY-NBOH acts as a partial agonist at the serotonin 5-HT_{2A} receptor, with an EC₅₀ of 9.87 nM and a maximum effect (E_{max}) of 34 ± 2 per cent.

== History ==
2C-B-FLY-NBOH was first described in Ralph Heim’s original German doctoral thesis.

== See also ==
- 25-NB (psychedelics)
- FLY (psychedelics)
