= 4-EA-NBOMe =

Substituted amphetamine designer drug

Clinical data
- Drug class: Psychoactive drug
- ATC code: None

Legal status
- Legal status: UK: Under Psychoactive Substances Act

Identifiers
- IUPAC name: 1-(4-ethylphenyl)-N-[(2-methoxyphenyl)methyl]propan-2-amine
- CAS Number: 2055108-04-6
- PubChem CID: 132280994
- ChemSpider: 52085382
- UNII: 5EI642XE6U
- CompTox Dashboard (EPA): DTXSID301337102

Chemical and physical data
- Formula: C_{19}H_{25}NO
- Molar mass: 283.415 g·mol^{−1}
- 3D model (JSmol): Interactive image
- SMILES: CCC1=CC=C(C=C1)CC(C)NCC2=CC=CC=C2OC
- InChI: InChI=1S/C19H25NO/c1-4-16-9-11-17(12-10-16)13-15(2)20-14-18-7-5-6-8-19(18)21-3/h5-12,15,20H,4,13-14H2,1-3H3; Key:WWWBFWRUWWKJIJ-UHFFFAOYSA-N

4-EA-NBOMe is a substituted amphetamine and 25-NB derivative which has been sold as a designer drug. It was first identified by a forensic laboratory in Germany in 2014, but while its analytical properties and metabolism have been studied, its pharmacology remains unknown.

== See also ==
- Substituted amphetamine
- 25-NB
- 25E-NBOMe
- 4-Ethylamphetamine
- Benzphetamine
- Clobenzorex
- PEA-NBOMe
