= 25TFM-NBOMe =

Chemical compound

Clinical data
- Other names: NBOMe-2C-TFM; 2C-TFM-NBOMe; Cimbi-138
- Drug class: Serotonin 5-HT_{2} receptor agonist; Serotonergic psychedelic; Hallucinogen

Identifiers
- IUPAC name: 2-(4-trifluoromethyl-2,5-dimethoxyphenyl)-N-[(2-methoxyphenyl)methyl]ethanamine
- CAS Number: 1027161-33-6
- PubChem CID: 10067667
- ChemSpider: 8243207
- UNII: X3V8LI2TUV
- CompTox Dashboard (EPA): DTXSID40435135

Chemical and physical data
- Formula: C_{19}H_{22}F_{3}NO_{3}
- Molar mass: 369.384 g·mol^{−1}
- 3D model (JSmol): Interactive image
- SMILES: FC(F)(F)c1c(OC)cc(c(OC)c1)CCNCc2ccccc2OC
- InChI: InChI=1S/C19H22F3NO3/c1-24-16-7-5-4-6-14(16)12-23-9-8-13-10-18(26-3)15(19(20,21)22)11-17(13)25-2/h4-7,10-11,23H,8-9,12H2,1-3H3; Key:FBHVTQIAHOTPAM-UHFFFAOYSA-N

25TFM-NBOMe (also known as NBOMe-2C-TFM, 2C-TFM-NBOMe, and Cimbi-138) is a derivative of the phenethylamine hallucinogen 2C-TFM, discovered by Ralf Heim at the Free University of Berlin by 2000. It can be taken to produce psychedelic effects similar to 25I-NBOMe and 25D-NBOMe.

== Pharmacology ==
=== Pharmacodynamics ===
25TFM-NBOMe activities
Target	Affinity (K_{i}, nM)
5-HT_{1A}	ND
5-HT_{1B}	ND
5-HT_{1D}	1,817
5-HT_{1E}	ND
5-HT_{1F}	ND
5-HT_{2A}	0.35–0.49 (K_{i}); 0.96–2.0 (EC_{50}); 80–92% (E_{max})
5-HT_{2B}	1.1 (K_{i}); ND (EC_{50}); ND (E_{max})
5-HT_{2C}	2.7 (K_{i}) (rat); 11.5 (EC_{50}); 110% (E_{max})
5-HT_{3}	ND
5-HT_{4}	ND
5-HT_{5A}	8,128
5-HT_{6}	23.4
5-HT_{7}	5,974
α_{1A}–α_{1D}	ND
α_{2A}–α_{2C}	ND
β_{1}–β_{3}	ND
D_{1}–D_{5}	ND
H_{1}–H_{4}	ND
M_{1}–M_{5}	ND
I_{1}	ND
σ_{1}, σ_{2}	ND
ORs	ND
TAAR1	ND
SERT	ND (K_{i}); ND (IC_{50}); ND (EC_{50})
NET	ND (K_{i}); ND (IC_{50}); ND (EC_{50})
DAT	ND (K_{i}); ND (IC_{50}); ND (EC_{50})
Notes: The smaller the value, the more avidly the drug binds to the site. All proteins are human unless otherwise specified. Refs:

25TFM-NBOMe acts as a potent partial agonist for the serotonin 5-HT_{2A} receptor, though its relative potency is disputed, with some studies finding it to be of lower potency than 25I-NBOMe, while others show it to be of similar or higher potency, possibly because of differences in the assay used.

== Chemistry ==
=== Analogues ===
Analogues of 25TFM-NBOMe include 2C-TFM, DOTFM, and TFMFly (DOTFM-FLY), among others.

== History ==
25TFM-NBOMe was first described in the scientific literature by Ralf Heim and colleagues at the Free University of Berlin by 2000.

== Society and culture ==
=== Legal status ===
==== Canada ====
25TFM-NBOMe is a controlled substance in Canada under phenethylamine blanket-ban language.

==== United Kingdom ====
This substance is a Class A drug in the United Kingdom as a result of the N-benzylphenethylamine catch-all clause in the Misuse of Drugs Act 1971.

== See also ==
- 25-NB (psychedelics)
