= 25T2-NBOMe =

Clinical data
- Other names: 2C-T-2-NBOMe; NBOMe-2C-T-2; N-(2-Methoxybenzyl)-4-ethylthio-2,5-dimethoxyphenethylamine
- Routes of administration: Sublingual
- Drug class: Serotonin 5-HT_{2} receptor agonist; Serotonergic psychedelic; Hallucinogen
- ATC code: None

Identifiers
- IUPAC name: 2-(4-ethylsulfanyl-2,5-dimethoxyphenyl)-N-[(2-methoxyphenyl)methyl]ethanamine
- CAS Number: 1391492-27-5
- PubChem CID: 129514317
- CompTox Dashboard (EPA): DTXSID301342515

Chemical and physical data
- Formula: C_{20}H_{27}NO_{3}S
- Molar mass: 361.50 g·mol^{−1}
- 3D model (JSmol): Interactive image
- SMILES: CCSC1=C(C=C(C(=C1)OC)CCNCC2=CC=CC=C2OC)OC
- InChI: InChI=1S/C20H27NO3S/c1-5-25-20-13-18(23-3)15(12-19(20)24-4)10-11-21-14-16-8-6-7-9-17(16)22-2/h6-9,12-13,21H,5,10-11,14H2,1-4H3; Key:OZEBFZPAWCXEGK-UHFFFAOYSA-N

25T2-NBOMe, also known as N-(2-methoxybenzyl)-4-ethylthio-2,5-dimethoxyphenethylamine, is a serotonergic psychedelic of the 25-NB (NBOMe) family. It is the NBOMe analogue of 2C-T-2.

== Use and effects ==
25T2-NBOMe's reported active dose range in humans has been described as 100 to 1,000 μg, with a typical dose estimate of 500 μg. The route is sublingual administration.

== Pharmacology ==
=== Pharmacodynamics ===
25T2-NBOMe activities
Target	Affinity (K_{i}, nM)
5-HT_{1A}	2,200
5-HT_{1B}	ND
5-HT_{1D}	ND
5-HT_{1E}	ND
5-HT_{1F}	ND
5-HT_{2A}	0.56–0.6 (K_{i}); 4.37–100 (EC_{50}); 38–81% (E_{max})
5-HT_{2B}	0.85 (K_{i}); 40 (EC_{50}); 31% (E_{max})
5-HT_{2C}	6.5 (K_{i}); 12.0 (EC_{50}); 103% (E_{max})
5-HT_{3}	ND
5-HT_{4}	ND
5-HT_{5A}	ND
5-HT_{6}	84.9
5-HT_{7}	ND
α_{1A}	550
α_{1B}, α_{1D}	ND
α_{2A}	450
α_{2B}, α_{2C}	ND
β_{1}–β_{3}	ND
D_{1}	7,700
D_{2}	1,600
D_{3}	3,000
D_{4}, D_{5}	ND
H_{1}	490
H_{2}–H_{4}	ND
M_{1}–M_{5}	ND
I_{1}	ND
σ_{1}, σ_{2}	ND
ORs	ND
TAAR1	4,200 (K_{i}) (mouse); 350 (K_{i}) (rat); 2,900 (EC_{50}) (mouse); 930 (EC_{50}) (rat) >10,000 (EC_{50}) (human); 30% (E_{max}) (mouse); 24% (E_{max}) (rat)
SERT	5,000 (K_{i}); 20,000 (IC_{50}); ND (EC_{50})
NET	5,900 (K_{i}); 25,000 (IC_{50}); ND (EC_{50})
DAT	8,600 (K_{i}); 67,000 (IC_{50}); ND (EC_{50})
Notes: The smaller the value, the more avidly the drug binds to the site. All proteins are human unless otherwise specified. Refs:

25T2-NBOMe acts as a highly potent and selective agonist of the serotonin 5-HT_{2} receptors. Its affinities and activities at a variety of other receptors and transporters have also been described.

== History ==
25T2-NBOMe was first described in the scientific literature by at least 2012.

== Society and culture ==
=== Legal status ===
==== Canada ====
25T2-NBOMe is a controlled substance in Canada under phenethylamine blanket-ban language.

== See also ==
- 25-NB
- 25T-NBOMe
- 25T4-NBOMe
- 25T7-NBOMe
