= 25T4-NBOMe =

Clinical data
- Other names: 2C-T-4-NBOMe; NBOMe-2C-T-4; N-(2-Methoxybenzyl)-4-isopropylthio-2,5-dimethoxyphenethylamine
- Routes of administration: Sublingual
- Drug class: Serotonin 5-HT_{2} receptor agonist; Serotonergic psychedelic; Hallucinogen
- ATC code: None

Identifiers
- IUPAC name: 2-(2,5-dimethoxy-4-propan-2-ylsulfanylphenyl)-N-[(2-methoxyphenyl)methyl]ethanamine
- CAS Number: 1354632-17-9
- PubChem CID: 125181243
- CompTox Dashboard (EPA): DTXSID101342533

Chemical and physical data
- Formula: C_{21}H_{29}NO_{3}S
- Molar mass: 375.53 g·mol^{−1}
- 3D model (JSmol): Interactive image
- SMILES: CC(C)SC1=C(C=C(C(=C1)OC)CCNCC2=CC=CC=C2OC)OC
- InChI: InChI=1S/C21H29NO3S/c1-15(2)26-21-13-19(24-4)16(12-20(21)25-5)10-11-22-14-17-8-6-7-9-18(17)23-3/h6-9,12-13,15,22H,10-11,14H2,1-5H3; Key:BOWHVFJVXBVJCU-UHFFFAOYSA-N

25T4-NBOMe, also known as N-(2-methoxybenzyl)-4-isopropylthio-2,5-dimethoxyphenethylamine, is a serotonergic psychedelic of the 25-NB (NBOMe) family. It is the NBOMe analogue of 2C-T-4.

== Use and effects ==
25T4-NBOMe's reported active dose range has been described as 150 to 1,200 μg, with a typical dose estimate of 500 μg. The route is sublingual administration.

== Pharmacology ==
=== Pharmacodynamics ===
25T4-NBOMe activities
Target	Affinity (K_{i}, nM)
5-HT_{1A}	2,500
5-HT_{1B}	ND
5-HT_{1D}	ND
5-HT_{1E}	ND
5-HT_{1F}	ND
5-HT_{2A}	1.6 (K_{i}); 1.3–130 (EC_{50}); 46% (E_{max})
5-HT_{2B}	ND (K_{i}); 200 (EC_{50}); 27% (E_{max})
5-HT_{2C}	16 (K_{i}); ND (EC_{50}); ND (E_{max})
5-HT_{3}	ND
5-HT_{4}	ND
5-HT_{5A}	ND
5-HT_{6}	ND
5-HT_{7}	ND
α_{1A}	580
α_{1B}, α_{1D}	ND
α_{2A}	260
α_{2B}, α_{2C}	ND
β_{1}–β_{3}	ND
D_{1}	4,900
D_{2}	1,700
D_{3}	1,900
D_{4}, D_{5}	ND
H_{1}	5,400
H_{2}–H_{4}	ND
M_{1}–M_{5}	ND
I_{1}	ND
σ_{1}, σ_{2}	ND
ORs	ND
TAAR1	1,500–1,600 (K_{i}) (mouse); 120 (K_{i}) (rat); 4,700 (EC_{50}) (mouse); 1,100 (EC_{50}) (rat) >10,000 (EC_{50}) (human); 33% (E_{max}) (mouse); 31% (E_{max}) (rat)
SERT	8,100 (K_{i}); 14,000 (IC_{50}); ND (EC_{50})
NET	4,300 (K_{i}); 28,000 (IC_{50}); ND (EC_{50})
DAT	6,200 (K_{i}); 58,000 (IC_{50}); ND (EC_{50})
Notes: The smaller the value, the more avidly the drug binds to the site. All proteins are human unless otherwise specified. Refs:

25T4-NBOMe acts as a highly potent and selective agonist of the serotonin 5-HT_{2} receptors. Its affinities and activities at a variety of other receptors and transporters have also been described.

== History ==
25T4-NBOMe was first described in the scientific literature by at least 2012.

== Society and culture ==
=== Legal status ===
==== Canada ====
25T4-NBOMe is a controlled substance in Canada under phenethylamine blanket-ban language.

== See also ==
- 25-NB
- 25T-NBOMe
- 25T2-NBOMe
- 25T7-NBOMe
