= DOI-NBOMe =

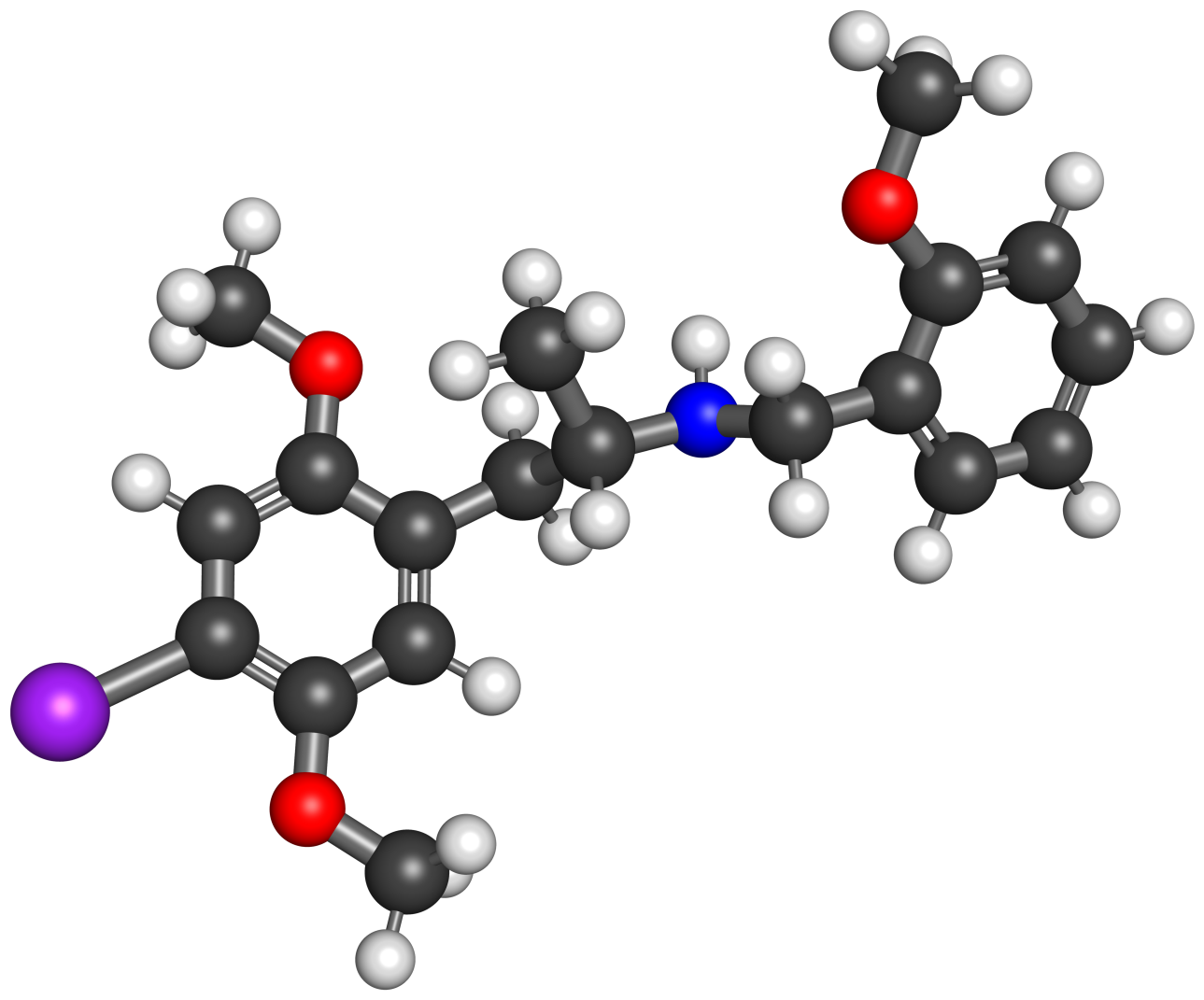

Clinical data
- Other names: NBOMe-DOI; N-(2-Methoxybenzyl)-4-iodo-2,5-dimethoxyamphetamine; 4-Iodo-2,5-dimethoxy-N-(2-methoxybenzyl)amphetamine
- Drug class: Non-hallucinogenic serotonin 5-HT_{2A} receptor agonist
- ATC code: None

Identifiers
- IUPAC name: 1-(4-iodo-2,5-dimethoxyphenyl)-N-[(2-methoxyphenyl)methyl]propan-2-amine
- CAS Number: 919797-13-0
- PubChem CID: 169776666
- PDB ligand: A1ELA (PDBe, RCSB PDB)

Chemical and physical data
- Formula: C_{19}H_{24}INO_{3}
- Molar mass: 441.309 g·mol^{−1}
- 3D model (JSmol): Interactive image
- SMILES: CC(CC1=CC(=C(C=C1OC)I)OC)NCC2=CC=CC=C2OC
- InChI: InChI=1S/C19H24INO3/c1-13(21-12-14-7-5-6-8-17(14)22-2)9-15-10-19(24-4)16(20)11-18(15)23-3/h5-8,10-11,13,21H,9,12H2,1-4H3; Key:XRQNUXKKHOVYIR-UHFFFAOYSA-N

DOI-NBOMe, or NBOMe-DOI, also known as N-(2-methoxybenzyl)-4-iodo-2,5-dimethoxyamphetamine, is a non-hallucinogenic serotonin 5-HT_{2A} receptor biased agonist of the phenethylamine, DOx, and 25-NB (NBOMe) families. It is the N-(2-methoxybenzyl) derivative of DOI and the amphetamine (i.e., α-methyl) analogue of 25I-NBOMe.

== Pharmacology ==
=== Pharmacodynamics ===
DOI-NBOMe is a potent serotonin 5-HT_{2A} receptor partial agonist, with an affinity (K_{i}) of 0.78 to 1.08 nM, an EC_{50} of 36.1 nM, and an E_{max} of 43% in the employed assay. As an agonist of the serotonin 5-HT_{2A} receptor, DOI-NBOMe had about half the affinity and potency of DOI and a little more than half the efficacy in comparison in vitro (with DOI having a K_{i} of 0.58–0.64 nM, an EC_{50} of 19.2 nM, and an E_{max} of 77%). Compared to 25I-NBOMe, the corresponding NBOMe analogue of 2C-I, DOI-NBOMe had about 14.4-fold lower potency as a serotonin 5-HT_{2A} receptor agonist and slightly more than half the activational efficacy. Whereas the potency of 2Cs can be dramatically increased by N-(2-methoxybenzyl) substitution, this has not been the case with the DOx series of psychedelics, where activity has been negatively impacted.

Besides the serotonin 5-HT_{2A} receptor, DOI-NBOMe has also been shown to bind to the serotonin 5-HT_{2C} receptor, with an affinity (K_{i}) of 21.0 nM. This was about 33-fold lower than the affinity of DOI. As such, DOI-NBOMe appears to show increased selectivity for the serotonin 5-HT_{2A} receptor over the serotonin 5-HT_{2C} receptor compared to DOI. For comparison, 25I-NBOMe had increased affinities for both the serotonin 5-HT_{2A} receptor and to a lesser extent the serotonin 5-HT_{2C} receptor compared to 2C-I.

Subsequent to its earlier discovery and characterization, DOI-NBOMe was found to be a biased agonist of the serotonin 5-HT_{2A} receptor, with robust G_{q} activation comparable to DOI but minor efficacy on G_{i} signaling. In addition, it was selective for the serotonin 5-HT_{2A} receptor, with much less or no agonism of the 5-HT_{1A}, 5-HT_{2B}, or 5-HT_{2C} receptors. The EC_{50} (E_{max}) values were 10 nM (103%) at the serotonin 5-HT_{2A} receptor (G_{q}) and 603 nM (145%) at the serotonin 5-HT_{2C} receptor. Values for G_{q}, G_{i}, and β-arrestin2 signaling at the serotonin 5-HT_{2A} receptor were also reported. DOI-NBOMe failed to produce the head-twitch response in rodents. Moreover, DOI-NBOMe antagonized the head-twitch response induced by DOI or LSD. The drug was found to produce rapid and sustained antidepressant-like effects in the forced swim test (FST) in rodents. In addition, it produced sustained anxiolytic-like effects in the marble-burying test. It was concluded that serotonin 5-HT_{2A} receptor G_{i} signaling and not G_{q} signaling is involved in the psychedelic-like effects of serotonergic psychedelics.

== Chemistry ==
=== Synthesis ===
The chemical synthesis of DOI-NBOMe has been described.

=== Analogues ===
Analogues of DOI-NBOMe include DOI, DOB-NBOMe, DOM-NBOMe, and 25I-NBOMe, among others.

== History ==
DOI-NBOMe was first described in the scientific literature by Ralf Heim by 2003. However, Heim only synthesized DOI-NBOMe without reporting its pharmacology. The pharmacological interactions of DOI-NBOMe were subsequently reported by Michael Braden and colleagues, from the lab of David E. Nichols, by 2006. DOI-NBOMe was later further characterized in 2026.

== See also ==
- 25-NB
- DOx
