= 25O-NBOMe =

Clinical data
- Other names: 2,4,5-TMPEA-NBOMe; NBOMe-2,4,5-TMPEA; TMPEA-2-NBOMe; NBOMe-TMPEA-2; N-(2-Methoxybenzyl)-2,4,5-trimethoxyphenethylamine
- Drug class: Serotonin receptor modulator; Serotonin 5-HT_{2A} receptor agonist; Serotonergic psychedelic; Hallucinogen
- ATC code: None

Identifiers
- IUPAC name: N-[(2-methoxyphenyl)methyl]-2-(2,4,5-trimethoxyphenyl)ethan-1-amine
- PubChem CID: 172213167

Chemical and physical data
- Formula: C_{19}H_{25}NO_{4}
- Molar mass: 331.412 g·mol^{−1}
- 3D model (JSmol): Interactive image
- SMILES: COc1cc(OC)c(cc1CCNCc1ccccc1OC)OC
- InChI: InChI=1S/C19H25NO4/c1-21-16-8-6-5-7-15(16)13-20-10-9-14-11-18(23-3)19(24-4)12-17(14)22-2/h5-8,11-12,20H,9-10,13H2,1-4H3; Key:YWHPPSGTTPXYSD-UHFFFAOYSA-N

25O-NBOMe, also known as 2,4,5-TMPEA-NBOMe or as N-(2-methoxybenzyl)-2,4,5-trimethoxyphenethylamine, is a serotonin receptor modulator and putative psychedelic drug of the phenethylamine and 25-NB (NBOMe) families. It is the N-(2-methoxybenzyl) derivative of 2C-O (2,4,5-trimethoxyphenethylamine).

The drug is known to act as a serotonin 5-HT_{2A} receptor partial agonist, with an EC_{50} of 1.02 to 7.24 nM and an E_{max} of 57 to 129%. It activated the serotonin 5-HT_{2A} receptor with 191- to 309-fold higher potency than 2C-O in vitro. 25O-NBOMe robustly and dose-dependently induces the head-twitch response, a behavioral proxy of psychedelic effects, in mice, with an ED_{50} of 0.70 mg/kg. For comparison, in other studies in mice, the ED_{50} of 25I-NBOMe was 0.078 mg/kg (9-fold lower) and of 25D-NBOMe was 0.23 mg/kg (3-fold lower).

25O-NBOMe was first described in the scientific literature by 2009. It is a controlled substance in Canada under phenethylamine blanket-ban language.

== See also ==
- 25-NB
- 25H-NBOMe
- TMA-2
- 2,4,6-TMPEA-NBOMe
