= RTI-83 =

Chemical compound

Clinical data
- Other names: RTI-4229-83

Identifiers
- IUPAC name: Methyl (1R,2S,3S,5S)-3-(4-ethylphenyl)-8-methyl-8-azabicyclo[3.2.1]octane-2-carboxylate
- CAS Number: 155337-52-3
- PubChem CID: 9882384
- ChemSpider: 8599598
- UNII: 3LPN4HUW1C
- ChEMBL: ChEMBL1947090
- CompTox Dashboard (EPA): DTXSID00628788

Chemical and physical data
- Formula: C_{18}H_{25}NO_{2}
- Molar mass: 287.403 g·mol^{−1}
- 3D model (JSmol): Interactive image
- SMILES: CCc3ccc(cc3)C(C1C(=O)OC)CC2CCC1N2C
- InChI: InChI=1S/C18H25NO2/c1-4-12-5-7-13(8-6-12)15-11-14-9-10-16(19(14)2)17(15)18(20)21-3/h5-8,14-17H,4,9-11H2,1-3H3/t14-,15+,16+,17-/m0/s1; Key:UAMCGXVVAUEEEU-HZMVEIRTSA-N

RTI-83 ((–)-2β-carbomethoxy-3β-(4-ethylphenyl)tropane) is a phenyltropane derivative which represents a rare example of an SDRI or serotonin-dopamine reuptake inhibitor, a drug which inhibits the reuptake of the neurotransmitters serotonin and dopamine, while having little or no effect on the reuptake of the related neurotransmitter noradrenaline. With a binding affinity (K_{i}) of 55 nM at DAT and 28.4 nM at SERT but only 4030 nM at NET, RTI-83 has reasonable selectivity for DAT/SERT over NET

cis-propenyl analogue (RTI-304)

However, further research has shown that by extending the ethyl chain even better selectivity can be achieved, with the 4′-(cis-propenyl) analogue having K_{i} values of 15 nM at DAT and 7.1 nM at SERT, vs 2800 nM at NET. However RTI-436 has an even better selectivity for DAT over NET (3.09 nM @ DAT and 1,960 nM @ NET, or a NET/DAT ratio of 634.3, but with lesser DAT/SERT equivalent potency with a ratio between them of 108) and RTI-88 has a still better ratio (984 NET/DAT with additionally having less selectivity than the former compound between DAT/SERT and having a more even spread of potency with the ratio between DAT and SERT being 88).

Binding comparison between phenyltropanes with high NET/DAT selectivity ratios
Compound	DAT [^{3}H]WIN-35428	5-HTT [^{3}H]Paroxetine	NET [^{3}H]Nisoxetine	Selectivity 5-HTT/DAT	Selectivity NET/DAT
RTI-83	55 ± 2.1	28.4 ± 3.8	4,030 ± 381	0.5	73.3
RTI-102	474	1928	43,400	4.06	91.5
RTI-304	15 ± 1.2	7.1 ± 0.71	2,800 ± 300	0.5	186.6
RTI-88	1.35 ± 0.11	120 ± 4	1,329 ± 124	88.9	984.0
83a^{* ‡}	1.20 ± 0.29	48.7 ± 8.4	10,000.0	40.6	8,333.3
RTI-143	4.06 ± 0.22	404 ± 56	40,270 ± 180	99.5	9,919.0
^{*}C3β-Ph-para=iodo, C2β-R=CO_{2}-i-Pr, N8=CH_{2}CH_{2}CH_{2}F^{‡}Compound code for phenyltropane in accord with Singh's "Chemistry, Design & SAR of cocaine antagonists" paper nomenclature, of no relation to RTI naming convention despite similarity to namesake of drug on topic.

Such drugs are speculated to be useful as potential antidepressants, but few examples have been reported in the literature as yet. However, while RTI-83 has been used for binding studies to model the monoamine transporter proteins, its pharmacology in vivo has not been studied in detail.

== See also ==
- 4-Ethylamphetamine
- 4-Ethylmethcathinone
- UWA-101
