= 5-APB-NBOMe =

Clinical data
- Other names: 5APB-NBOMe; N-MOB-5-APB; N-(2-Methoxybenzyl)-5-(2-aminopropyl)benzofuran
- ATC code: None

Identifiers
- IUPAC name: 1-(1-benzofuran-5-yl)-N-[(2-methoxyphenyl)methyl]propan-2-amine
- CAS Number: 2055348-17-7
- PubChem CID: 138858150
- ChemSpider: 52085582
- UNII: YCQ8K7YA07
- CompTox Dashboard (EPA): DTXSID301342096

Chemical and physical data
- Formula: C_{19}H_{21}NO_{2}
- Molar mass: 295.382 g·mol^{−1}
- 3D model (JSmol): Interactive image
- SMILES: CC(CC1=CC2=C(C=C1)OC=C2)NCC3=CC=CC=C3OC
- InChI: InChI=1S/C19H21NO2/c1-14(20-13-17-5-3-4-6-18(17)21-2)11-15-7-8-19-16(12-15)9-10-22-19/h3-10,12,14,20H,11,13H2,1-2H3; Key:NSWWDACHSBMHLV-UHFFFAOYSA-N

5-APB-NBOMe, also known as N-(2-methoxybenzyl)-5-(2-aminopropyl)benzofuran, is a drug of the phenethylamine, amphetamine, benzofuran, and 25-NB (NBOMe) families related to the entactogen and mildly psychedelic drug 5-APB. It is the N-(2-methoxybenzyl) derivative of 5-APB. The preclinical pharmacokinetics of 5-APB-NBOMe have been studied. The drug was encountered as a novel designer drug in Germany in 2014.

== See also ==
- 25-NB (psychedelics)
- 2C2-NBOMe (NBOMe-MMDPEA-2)
- NBOMe-mescaline
- DOM-NBOMe
