= 25T7-NBOMe =

Chemical compound

Clinical data
- Other names: 2C-T-7-NBOMe; NBOMe-2C-T-7; N-(2-Methoxybenzyl)-4-propylthio-2,5-dimethoxyphenethylamine
- Drug class: Serotonin 5-HT_{2} receptor agonist; Serotonergic psychedelic; Hallucinogen
- ATC code: None

Legal status
- Legal status: BR: Class F2 (Prohibited psychotropics)

Identifiers
- IUPAC name: 2-(2,5-dimethoxy-4-propylsulfanylphenyl)-N-[(2-methoxyphenyl)methyl]ethanamine
- CAS Number: 1539266-55-1
- PubChem CID: 125181253
- CompTox Dashboard (EPA): DTXSID701342517

Chemical and physical data
- Formula: C_{21}H_{29}NO_{3}S
- Molar mass: 375.53 g·mol^{−1}
- 3D model (JSmol): Interactive image
- SMILES: CCCSC1=C(C=C(C(=C1)OC)CCNCC2=CC=CC=C2OC)OC
- InChI: InChI=1S/C21H29NO3S/c1-5-12-26-21-14-19(24-3)16(13-20(21)25-4)10-11-22-15-17-8-6-7-9-18(17)23-2/h6-9,13-14,22H,5,10-12,15H2,1-4H3; Key:CPVMNHOHOSNFOP-UHFFFAOYSA-N

25T7-NBOMe, also known as 2C-T-7-NBOMe or NBOMe-2C-T-7 as well as N-(2-methoxybenzyl)-4-propylthio-2,5-dimethoxyphenethylamine, is a serotonergic psychedelic of the 25-NB (NBOMe) family. It is the NBOMe analogue of 2C-T-7. The compound has been sold as a designer drug.

== Use and effects ==
The active dose range and route of 25T7-NBOMe do not appear to have been described.

== Pharmacology ==
=== Pharmacodynamics ===
25T7-NBOMe activities
Target	Affinity (K_{i}, nM)
5-HT_{1A}	1,800–>10,000
5-HT_{1B}	1,902–>10,000
5-HT_{1D}	1,349–2,176
5-HT_{1E}	>10,000
5-HT_{1F}	ND
5-HT_{2A}	0.68–1.16 (K_{i}); 7.42–260 (EC_{50}); 41–173% (E_{max})
5-HT_{2B}	2.16–2.3 (K_{i}); 310 (EC_{50}); 14% (E_{max})
5-HT_{2C}	1.33–6.4 (K_{i}); 19.1 (EC_{50}); 95% (E_{max})
5-HT_{3}	>10,000
5-HT_{4}	ND
5-HT_{5A}	>10,000
5-HT_{6}	62.4–68.8
5-HT_{7}	>10,000
α_{1A}	340–490
α_{1B}	>10,000
α_{1D}	1,429
α_{2A}	226–360
α_{2B}	603
α_{2C}	479
β_{1}	ND
β2	4,266
β_{3}	2,163
D_{1}	4,100
D_{2}	1,000
D_{3}	153–1,400
D_{4}	186
D_{5}	ND
H_{1}	403–1,200
H_{2}	1,000
H3–H_{4}	ND
M_{1}–M_{5}	ND
I_{1}	ND
σ_{1}	19.1
σ_{2}	22.6
MOR	944
DOR	>10,000
KOR	148
TAAR1	1,000 (K_{i}) (mouse); 88–90 (K_{i}) (rat); 2,100 (EC_{50}) (mouse); 550 (EC_{50}) (rat) >10,000 (EC_{50}) (human); 68% (E_{max}) (mouse); 52% (E_{max}) (rat)
SERT	1,514–3,200 (K_{i}); 17,000 (IC_{50}); ND (EC_{50})
NET	3,700–>10,000 (K_{i}); 34,000 (IC_{50}); ND (EC_{50})
DAT	2,344 (K_{i}); 55,000 (IC_{50}); ND (EC_{50})
Notes: The smaller the value, the more avidly the drug binds to the site. All proteins are human unless otherwise specified. Refs:

25T7-NBOMe acts as a highly potent and selective agonist of the serotonin 5-HT_{2} receptors. Its affinities and activities at a variety of other receptors and transporters have also been described.

== History ==
25T7-NBOMe was first described in the scientific literature by 2012.

== Society and culture ==
=== Legal status ===
==== Canada ====
25T7-NBOMe is a controlled substance in Canada under phenethylamine blanket-ban language.

== See also ==
- 25-NB
- 25T-NBOMe
- 25T2-NBOMe
- 25T4-NBOMe
