= DOM-NBOMe =

Clinical data
- Other names: NBOMe-DOM; N-(2-Methoxybenzyl)-4-methyl-2,5-dimethoxyamphetamine; 4-Methyl-2,5-dimethoxy-N-(2-methoxybenzyl)amphetamine
- Drug class: Serotonin 5-HT_{2} receptor agonist; Serotonergic psychedelic; Hallucinogen
- ATC code: None

Identifiers
- IUPAC name: 1-(2,5-dimethoxy-4-methylphenyl)-N-[(2-methoxyphenyl)methyl]propan-2-amine
- CAS Number: 2836395-73-2
- PubChem CID: 165123639
- ChemSpider: 129677314

Chemical and physical data
- Formula: C_{20}H_{27}NO_{3}
- Molar mass: 329.440 g·mol^{−1}
- 3D model (JSmol): Interactive image
- SMILES: CC1=CC(=C(C=C1OC)CC(C)NCC2=CC=CC=C2OC)OC
- InChI: InChI=1S/C20H27NO3/c1-14-10-20(24-5)17(12-19(14)23-4)11-15(2)21-13-16-8-6-7-9-18(16)22-3/h6-10,12,15,21H,11,13H2,1-5H3; Key:KWMCUFLLPHCVSK-UHFFFAOYSA-N

DOM-NBOMe, or NBOMe-DOM, also known as N-(2-methoxybenzyl)-4-methyl-2,5-dimethoxyamphetamine, is a serotonin 5-HT_{2} receptor agonist and putative psychedelic drug of the phenethylamine, DOx, and 25-NB (NBOMe) families. It is the N-(2-methoxybenzyl) derivative of DOM and the amphetamine (i.e., α-methyl) analogue of 25D-NBOMe.

== Pharmacology ==
=== Pharmacodynamics ===
DOM-NBOMe is a potent agonist of the serotonin 5-HT_{2} receptors, including the serotonin 5-HT_{2A}, 5-HT_{2B}, and 5-HT_{2C} receptors. Its affinity (K_{i}) for the serotonin 5-HT_{2A} receptor was reported to be 45.8 nM. In terms of functional activity, DOM-NBOMe showed an EC_{50} of 4.25 nM and E_{max} of 88.8% at the serotonin 5-HT_{2A} receptor, an EC_{50} of 54.6 nM and E_{max} of 20.1% at the serotonin 5-HT_{2B} receptor, and an EC_{50} of 9.96 nM and E_{max} of 87.6% at the serotonin 5-HT_{2C} receptor. It was inactive as an agonist of the serotonin 5-HT_{1A} receptor, with an EC_{50} of >10,000 nM. DOM-NBOMe showed 17-fold lower potency as a serotonin 5-HT_{2A} receptor agonist compared to 25D-NBOMe in vitro, while DOM was not assessed in the same study and thus DOM-NBOMe could not be compared to that compound. Whereas the potency of 2Cs can be dramatically increased by N-(2-methoxybenzyl) substitution, this has not been the case with the DOx series of psychedelics, where activity has been negatively impacted.

DOM-NBOMe has been assessed and found to produce the head-twitch response, a behavioral proxy of psychedelic effects, in rodents. However, DOM-NBOMe showed a weak maximal head-twitch response compared to DOI. Whereas DOI induced a maximum of 36 head twitches in a 20-minute period, DOM-NBOMe produced a maximum of 12 head twitches in the same amount of time (i.e., about 33% of that of DOI). Hence, although DOM-NBOMe could still be an active psychedelic in humans, it may have attenuated hallucinogenic effects compared to non-25-NB DOx psychedelics. The doses of DOM-NBOMe producing the head-twitch response were not reported.

=== Pharmacokinetics ===
The in-vitro metabolism and cytochrome P450 (CYP450) inhibition of DOM-NBOMe have been studied.

== History ==
DOM-NBOMe was first disclosed in a patent application (compound #17, example #16 in WO2022/192781) by Andrew Kruegel at Gilgamesh Pharmaceuticals by 2022.

== See also ==
- DOB-NBOMe
- DOI-NBOMe
- NBOMe-mescaline
- 5-APB-NBOMe
- 25D-NM-NDEAOP
- 25-NB
- DOx
