= C30-NBOMe =

Clinical data
- Other names: N-(3,4,5-Trimethoxybenzyl)-4-chloro-2,5-dimethoxyphenethylamine; 25C-NB345OMe; 30C-NBOMe
- Drug class: Serotonin receptor modulator; Serotonin 5-HT_{2A} receptor agonist
- ATC code: None

Identifiers
- IUPAC name: 2-(4-chloro-2,5-dimethoxyphenyl)-N-[(3,4,5-trimethoxyphenyl)methyl]ethanamine
- CAS Number: 1445574-98-0
- PubChem CID: 118796424
- ChemSpider: 52085496
- UNII: E169JK0074
- CompTox Dashboard (EPA): DTXSID201342986

Chemical and physical data
- Formula: C_{20}H_{26}ClNO_{5}
- Molar mass: 395.88 g·mol^{−1}
- 3D model (JSmol): Interactive image
- SMILES: COC1=CC(=CC(=C1OC)OC)CNCCC2=CC(=C(C=C2OC)Cl)OC
- InChI: InChI=1S/C20H26ClNO5/c1-23-16-11-15(21)17(24-2)10-14(16)6-7-22-12-13-8-18(25-3)20(27-5)19(9-13)26-4/h8-11,22H,6-7,12H2,1-5H3; Key:ZQYYVTABADQBTJ-UHFFFAOYSA-N

C30-NBOMe, or 30C-NBOMe, also known as N-(3,4,5-trimethoxybenzyl)-4-chloro-2,5-dimethoxyphenethylamine or as 25C-NB345OMe, is a serotonin receptor modulator of the phenethylamine, 2C, and 25-NB (NBOMe) families. It is an analogue of 25C-NBOMe with three methoxy groups on the benzyl ring, located at the 3, 4, and 5 positions. The drug was encountered as a novel designer drug in Sweden in 2013. However, C30-NBOMe showed greater than or equal to 1,000-fold lower potency as a serotonin 5-HT_{2A} receptor agonist in vitro compared to conventional 25-NB drugs like 25I-NBOMe and 25B-NBOMe (EC_{50} = 1,251 nM vs. 0.40–1.2 nM, respectively). Its affinity for the serotonin 5-HT_{2A} receptor was similarly low (K_{i} = 515 nM, versus 0.82 nM for 25C-NBOMe). The chemical identification of C30-NBOMe has been studied and described.

== See also ==
- 25-NB (psychedelics)
