= 25C-NBF =

Chemical compound

Clinical data
- Other names: 2C-C-NBF; NBF-2C-C; N-(2-Fluorobenzyl)-4-chloro-2,5-dimethoxyphenethylamine
- Drug class: Serotonin receptor agonist; Serotonin 5-HT_{2A} receptor agonist
- ATC code: None

Legal status
- Legal status: BR: Class F2 (Prohibited psychotropics); DE: NpSG (Industrial and scientific use only); UK: Class A

Identifiers
- IUPAC name: 2-(4-chloro-2,5-dimethoxyphenyl)-N-[(2-fluorophenyl)methyl]ethanamine
- CAS Number: 1373879-23-2
- PubChem CID: 125181230
- ChemSpider: 59718631
- UNII: CDK8YL4X34

Chemical and physical data
- Formula: C_{17}H_{19}ClFNO_{2}
- Molar mass: 323.79 g·mol^{−1}
- 3D model (JSmol): Interactive image
- SMILES: COC1=CC(=C(C=C1CCNCC2=CC=CC=C2F)OC)Cl
- InChI: InChI=1S/C17H19ClFNO2/c1-21-16-10-14(18)17(22-2)9-12(16)7-8-20-11-13-5-3-4-6-15(13)19/h3-6,9-10,20H,7-8,11H2,1-2H3; Key:AHIUIEOLKNDLSC-UHFFFAOYSA-N

25C-NBF (2C-C-NBF, NBF-2C-C) is a derivative of the phenethylamine hallucinogen 2C-C, which acts as a highly potent partial agonist for the human 5-HT_{2A} receptor. It produces psychoplastogenic and rapid antidepressant-like effects in preclinical research.

== Society and culture ==
=== Legal status ===
==== Sweden ====
The Riksdag added 25C-NBF to Narcotic Drugs Punishments Act under swedish schedule I ("substances, plant materials and fungi which normally do not have medical use") as of January 26, 2016, published by Medical Products Agency (MPA) in regulation HSLF-FS 2015:35 listed as 25C-NBF, and 2-(4-kloro-2,5-dimetoxifenyl)-N-(2-fluorobensyl)etanamin.

=== United Kingdom ===
This substance is a Class A drug in the United Kingdom as a result of the N-benzylphenethylamine catch-all clause in the Misuse of Drugs Act 1971.

== See also ==
- 25-NB (psychedelics)
