= 25E-NBOH =

Chemical compound

Clinical data
- Other names: 2C-E-NBOH; NBOH-2C-E

Legal status
- Legal status: BR: Class F2 (Prohibited psychotropics); DE: NpSG (Industrial and scientific use only); UK: Class A

Identifiers
- IUPAC name: 2-({[2-(4-ethyl-2,5-dimethoxyphenyl)ethyl]amino}methyl)phenol
- CAS Number: 1391489-79-4; hydrochloride: 1539266-40-4
- PubChem CID: 135391539
- ChemSpider: 95668952
- UNII: EB0KU6R3BE
- CompTox Dashboard (EPA): DTXSID001017254

Chemical and physical data
- Formula: C_{19}H_{25}NO_{3}
- Molar mass: 315.413 g·mol^{−1}
- 3D model (JSmol): Interactive image
- SMILES: CCC1=CC(=C(C=C1OC)CCNCC2=CC=CC=C2O)OC
- InChI: InChI=1S/C19H25NO3/c1-4-14-11-19(23-3)15(12-18(14)22-2)9-10-20-13-16-7-5-6-8-17(16)21/h5-8,11-12,20-21H,4,9-10,13H2,1-3H3; Key:SYBINTRPEZWFLZ-UHFFFAOYSA-N

25E-NBOH (2C-E-NBOH, NBOH-2C-E) is a derivative of the phenethylamine derived hallucinogen 2C-E. It was first developed by Martin Hansen at the University of Copenhagen in 2010 as a brain imaging agent, but has subsequently been sold as a designer drug, first being identified in Brazil in 2018 on seized blotter paper, as well as in Slovenia and France. It acts as a potent serotonin receptor agonist with similar affinity to better-known compounds such as 25I-NBOMe at 5-HT_{2A} and 5-HT_{2C} receptors.

== Society and culture ==
=== Legal status ===
==== Canada ====
25E-NBOH is a controlled substance in Canada under phenethylamine blanket-ban language.

==== United Kingdom ====
This substance is a Class A drug in the United Kingdom as a result of the N-benzylphenethylamine catch-all clause in the Misuse of Drugs Act 1971.

==== United States ====
25E-NBOH is not an explicitly controlled substance in the United States. However, it could be considered a controlled substance under the Federal Analogue Act if intended for human consumption.

== See also ==
- 4-EA-NBOMe
- DOET
- 2C-TFE
- 2C-E-FLY
