= 25B-NBF =

Chemical compound

Clinical data
- Other names: 2C-B-NBF; NBF-2C-B
- ATC code: (HCl): None

Legal status
- Legal status: DE: NpSG (Industrial and scientific use only); UK: Under Psychoactive Substances Act

Identifiers
- IUPAC name: 2-(4-bromo-2,5-dimethoxyphenyl)-N-(2-fluorobenzyl)ethanamine
- CAS Number: (HCl): 1391487-99-2
- PubChem CID: (HCl): 125181239
- ChemSpider: (HCl): 32055556
- UNII: (HCl): SSW3KY7SWW
- CompTox Dashboard (EPA): (HCl): DTXSID801337157

Chemical and physical data
- 3D model (JSmol): (HCl): Interactive image
- SMILES: (HCl): COC1=CC(CCNCC2=CC=CC=C2F)=C(OC)C=C1Br
- InChI: (HCl): InChI=1S/C17H19BrFNO2.ClH/c1-21-16-10-14(18)17(22-2)9-12(16)7-8-20-11-13-5-3-4-6-15(13)19;/h3-6,9-10,20H,7-8,11H2,1-2H3;1H

25B-NBF (2C-B-NBF, NBF-2C-B) is a derivative of the phenethylamine hallucinogen 2C-B, which acts as a highly potent partial agonist for the human 5-HT_{2A} receptor.

== Society and culture ==
=== Legal status ===
==== Sweden ====
The Riksdag added 25B-NBF to Narcotic Drugs Punishments Act under swedish schedule I ("substances, plant materials and fungi which normally do not have medical use") as of January 26, 2016, published by Medical Products Agency (MPA) in regulation HSLF-FS 2015:35 listed as 25B-NBF, and 2-(4-bromo-2,5-dimetoxifenyl)-N-(2-fluorobensyl)etanamin.

==== United Kingdom ====
This substance is a Class A drug in the United Kingdom as a result of the N-benzylphenethylamine catch-all clause in the Misuse of Drugs Act 1971.

== See also ==
- 25-NB (psychedelics)
