= 25G-NBOMe =

Chemical compound

Clinical data
- Other names: NBOMe-2C-G
- ATC code: None

Legal status
- Legal status: UK: Class A

Identifiers
- IUPAC name: 2-(2,5-dimethoxy-3,4-dimethylphenyl)-N-[(2-methoxyphenyl)methyl]ethanamine
- CAS Number: 1354632-65-7
- PubChem CID: 118796428
- ChemSpider: 29341725
- UNII: 87KXL8U1L5
- CompTox Dashboard (EPA): DTXSID401152547

Chemical and physical data
- Formula: C_{20}H_{27}NO_{3}
- Molar mass: 329.440 g·mol^{−1}
- 3D model (JSmol): Interactive image
- SMILES: CC1=C(C=C(C(=C1C)OC)CCNCC2=CC=CC=C2OC)OC
- InChI: InChI=1S/C20H27NO3/c1-14-15(2)20(24-5)16(12-19(14)23-4)10-11-21-13-17-8-6-7-9-18(17)22-3/h6-9,12,21H,10-11,13H2,1-5H3; Key:VDAUMFACIMNTDA-UHFFFAOYSA-N

25G-NBOMe, also known as NBOMe-2C-G, is a derivative of the phenethylamine hallucinogen 2C-G, which acts as a highly potent agonist for the human 5-HT_{2A} receptor.

== Toxicity and harm potential ==
NBOMe compounds are often associated with life-threatening toxicity and death. Studies on NBOMe family of compounds demonstrated that the substance exhibit neurotoxic and cardiotoxic activity. Reports of autonomic dysfunction remains prevalent with NBOMe compounds, with most individuals experiencing sympathomimetic toxicity such as vasoconstriction, hypertension and tachycardia in addition to hallucinations. Other symptoms of toxidrome include agitation or aggression, seizure, hyperthermia, diaphoresis, hypertonia, rhabdomyolysis, and death. Researchers report that NBOMe intoxication frequently display signs of serotonin syndrome. The likelihood of seizure is higher in NBOMes compared to other psychedelics.

NBOMe and NBOHs are regularly sold as LSD in blotter papers, which have a bitter taste and different safety profiles. Despite high potency, recreational doses of LSD have only produced low incidents of acute toxicity. Fatalities involved in NBOMe intoxication suggest that a significant number of individuals ingested the substance which they believed was LSD, and researchers report that "users familiar with LSD may have a false sense of security when ingesting NBOMe inadvertently". While most fatalities are due to the physical effects of the drug, there have also been reports of death due to self-harm and suicide under the influence of the substance.

Given limited documentation of NBOMe consumption, the long-term effects of the substance remain unknown. NBOMe compounds are not active orally, (Note: The potency of N-benzylphenethylamines via buccal, sublingual, or nasal absorption is 50- to 100-fold greater (by weight) than oral route compared to the parent 2C-x compounds. Researchers hypothesize the low oral metabolic stability of N-benzylphenethylamines is likely causing the low bioavailability on the oral route, although the metabolic profile of this compounds remains unpredictable; therefore researchers state that the fatalities linked to these substances may partly be explained by differences in the metabolism between individuals.) and are usually taken sublingually. When NBOMes are administered sublingually, numbness of the tongue and mouth followed by a metallic chemical taste was observed, and researchers describe this physical side effect as one of the main discriminants between NBOMe compounds and LSD.

=== Neurotoxic and cardiotoxic actions ===
Many of the NBOMe compounds have high potency agonist activity at additional 5-HT receptors and prolonged activation of 5-HT_{2B} can cause cardiac valvulopathy in high doses and chronic use. 5-HT_{2B} receptors have been strongly implicated in causing drug-induced valvular heart disease. The high affinity of NBOMe compounds for adrenergic α_{1} receptor has been reported to contribute to the stimulant-type cardiovascular effects.

In vitro studies, 25C-NBOMe has been shown to exhibit cytotoxicity on neuronal cell lines SH-SY5Y, PC12, and SN471, and the compound was more potent than methamphetamine at reducing the visibility of the respective cells; the neurotoxicity of the compound involves activation of MAPK/ERK cascade and inhibition of Akt/PKB signaling pathway. 25C-NBOMe, including the other derivative 25D-NBOMe, reduced the visibility of cardiomyocytes H9c2 cells, and both substances downregulated expression level of p21 (CDC24/RAC)-activated kinase 1 (PAK1), an enzyme with documented cardiac protective effects.

Preliminary studies on 25C-NBOMe have shown that the substance is toxic to development, heart health, and brain health in zebrafish, rats, and Artemia salina, a common organism for studying potential drug effects on humans, but more research is needed on the topic, the doses, and if the toxicology results apply to humans. Researchers of the study also recommended further investigation of the drug's potential in damaging pregnant women and their fetus due to the substance's damaging effects to development.

=== Emergency treatment ===
At present, there are no specific antidotes for NBOMes, and all acute intoxication is managed by symptomatic treatments, such as administration of benzodiazepines, antipsychotic drugs, and antiarrhythmic agents, such as beta blockers; some emergency interventions are intended to specifically treat rhabdomyolysis, which may lead to critical complications such as metabolic acidosis and acute kidney injury.

== Society and culture ==
=== Legal status ===
==== Canada ====
25G-NBOMe is a controlled substance in Canada under phenethylamine blanket-ban language.

==== Sweden ====
The Riksdag added 25G-NBOMe to Narcotic Drugs Punishments Act under swedish schedule I ("substances, plant materials and fungi which normally do not have medical use") as of January 16, 2015, published by Medical Products Agency (MPA) in regulation LVFS 2014:11 listed as 25G-NBOMe, and 2-(2,5-dimetoxi-3,4-dimetylfenyl)-N-(2-metoxibensyl)etanamin.

==== United Kingdom ====
This substance is a Class A drug in the United Kingdom as a result of the N-benzylphenethylamine catch-all clause in the Misuse of Drugs Act 1971.

== See also ==
- 25-NB
