= 25O-NBcP =

Chemical compound

Clinical data
- Other names: NBcPr-2C-O

Identifiers
- IUPAC name: N-(2-cyclopropylbenzyl)-1-(2,4,5-trimethoxyphenyl)-2-aminoethane
- CAS Number: 2865186-10-1
- PubChem CID: 166130279

Chemical and physical data
- Formula: C_{21}H_{27}NO_{3}
- Molar mass: 341.451 g·mol^{−1}
- 3D model (JSmol): Interactive image
- SMILES: COc1cc(CCNCc2ccccc2C2CC2)c(OC)cc1OC
- InChI: InChI=1S/C21H27NO3/c1-23-19-13-21(25-3)20(24-2)12-16(19)10-11-22-14-17-6-4-5-7-18(17)15-8-9-15/h4-7,12-13,15,22H,8-11,14H2,1-3H3; Key:ASIWTSUIYDTYFT-UHFFFAOYSA-N

25O-NBcP (NBcPr-2C-O) is a phenethylamine derivative from the 25-NB class. It acts as a potent agonist at the 5-HT_{2A} receptor with weaker activity at 5-HT_{2B} and 5-HT_{2C}, and unlike the parent compound 2C-O, 25O-NBcP produces a head-twitch response in animal studies which often correlates with potential for psychedelic effects in humans.

== See also ==
- 25C-NBOMe (NBOMe-2C-C)
