= Metamizil =

Clinical data
- Drug class: muscarinic antagonist (anticholinergic drug); sedative and hypnotic
- ATC code: None

Identifiers
- IUPAC name: 1-(diethylamino)propan-2-yl 2-hydroxy-2,2-diphenylacetate
- CAS Number: 57-36-3
- PubChem CID: 65527
- CompTox Dashboard (EPA): DTXSID50972485

Chemical and physical data
- 3D model (JSmol): Interactive image
- SMILES: CCN(CC)CC(C)OC(=O)C(C1=CC=CC=C1)(C2=CC=CC=C2)O
- InChI: InChI=1S/C21H27NO3/c1-4-22(5-2)16-17(3)25-20(23)21(24,18-12-8-6-9-13-18)19-14-10-7-11-15-19/h6-15,17,24H,4-5,16H2,1-3H3; Key:QTLYTFJMPQZTRQ-UHFFFAOYSA-N

Metamizil is a central anticholinergic drug and a tranquilliser with powerful sedative and hypnotic effects; it was studied during the Soviet era by Soviet scientists alongside amizil.

== Pharmacology ==
Metamizil acts as a muscarinic antagonist and, at a dose of 2 mg/kg, blocks the symptoms of parkinsonism (hypokinesia, rigidity and tremor). Metamizil was used as premedication, and is a strong sedative.

The median lethal dose following intraperitoneal administration was 118 mg/kg (mouse).

== Uses ==
It has been suggested that it be used in the treatment of neuroses in dogs and humans. Sometimes as premedication (as a tranquilliser). As well as in the treatment of vascular parkinsonism and cerebral palsy.

== Side effects ==
The reported side effects included dizziness and a dry mouth.
