= 2,4,6-TMPEA-NBOMe =

Clinical data
- Other names: ψ-2C-O-NBOMe; 26O-NBOMe; NBOMe-TMPEA-6; N-(2-Methoxybenzyl)-2,4,6-trimethoxyphenethylamine
- Routes of administration: Oral, intranasal
- Drug class: Serotonin 5-HT_{2A} receptor agonist; Serotonergic psychedelic; Hallucinogen
- ATC code: None

Identifiers
- IUPAC name: N-[(2-methoxyphenyl)methyl]-2-(2,4,6-trimethoxyphenyl)ethan-1-amine
- CAS Number: 1335331-68-4

Chemical and physical data
- Formula: C_{19}H_{25}NO_{4}
- Molar mass: 331.412 g·mol^{−1}
- 3D model (JSmol): Interactive image
- SMILES: COc1cc(OC)c(c(c1)OC)CCNCc1ccccc1OC
- InChI: InChI=1S/C19H25NO4/c1-21-15-11-18(23-3)16(19(12-15)24-4)9-10-20-13-14-7-5-6-8-17(14)22-2/h5-8,11-12,20H,9-10,13H2,1-4H3; Key:NTLHTSWPAAMHIC-UHFFFAOYSA-N

2,4,6-TMPEA-NBOMe, also known as ψ-2C-O-NBOMe or 26O-NBOMe as well as N-(2-methoxybenzyl)-2,4,6-trimethoxyphenethylamine, is a psychedelic drug of the phenethylamine, ψ-PEA, and N-benzylphenethylamine (NBOMe) families. It is the NBOMe derivative of ψ-2C-O (2,4,6-TMPEA). The drug is said to produce psychedelic effects such as visuals. It has been found to act as a potent serotonin 5-HT_{2A} receptor partial agonist, with an EC_{50} of 1.7 nM and an E_{max} of 49%. 2,4,6-TMPEA-NBOMe was first described in the scientific literature in 2009. Subsequently, it was encountered as a novel designer drug in Russia in 2015. The drug is a controlled substance in Canada under phenethylamine blanket-ban language.

== See also ==
- 25-NB (psychedelics)
- NBOMe-mescaline (3,4,5-TMPEA-NBOMe)
- 25O-NBOMe (2,4,5-TMPEA-NBOMe)
