= 25B-NBOH =

Chemical compound

Clinical data
- Other names: 2C-B-NBOH; NBOH-2C-B; N-(2-Hydroxybenzyl)-4-bromo-2,5-dimethoxyphenethylamine
- Drug class: Serotonin 5-HT_{2A} receptor agonist; Serotonergic psychedelic; Hallucinogen

Legal status
- Legal status: BR: Class F2 (Prohibited psychotropics); DE: NpSG (Industrial and scientific use only); UK: Class A

Identifiers
- IUPAC name: 2-({[2-(4-bromo-2,5-dimethoxyphenyl)ethyl]amino}methyl)phenol
- CAS Number: 1335331-46-8
- PubChem CID: 125181394
- ChemSpider: 58191433
- UNII: KHR1SJ9L0Y
- CompTox Dashboard (EPA): DTXSID401017175

Chemical and physical data
- Formula: C_{17}H_{20}BrNO_{3}
- Molar mass: 366.255 g·mol^{−1}
- 3D model (JSmol): Interactive image
- SMILES: BrC2=CC(=C(CCNCC1=C(C=CC=C1)O)C=C2OC)OC
- InChI: InChI=1S/C17H20BrNO3/c1-21-16-10-14(18)17(22-2)9-12(16)7-8-19-11-13-5-3-4-6-15(13)20/h3-6,9-10,19-20H,7-8,11H2,1-2H3; Key:RSUNJYKZRKIBNB-UHFFFAOYSA-N

25B-NBOH, also known as N-(2-hydroxybenzyl)-4-bromo-2,5-dimethoxyphenethylamine, is a psychedelic drug of the phenethylamine, 2C, and N-benzylphenethylamine families related to 2C-B and 25B-NBOMe. It has been sold and encountered as a novel designer drug.

== Pharmacology ==
=== Pharmacodynamics ===
25B-NBOH acts as a potent serotonin receptor agonist with similar affinity to the better-known compound 25B-NBOMe at 5-HT_{2A} and 5-HT_{2C} receptors with affinities (K_{i}) of 5.0 nM and 0.40 nM, respectively. It fully substitutes for DOM in rodent drug discrimination tests, but with about 26-fold greater potency in comparison. The drug was also 18-fold more potent in substituting for DOM than 25B-NBOMe in rodents. In addition to its psychedelic-like effects, 25B-NBOH produces hypolocomotion in rodents, but with about 60% of the potency of DOM and about the same potency as 25B-NBOMe. There was an 853-fold difference in its potency in the drug discrimination and hypolocomotion tests, which is described as unusual among psychedelics and warranting further investigation.

== Chemistry ==
=== Synthesis ===
The chemical synthesis of 25B-NBOH has been described.

=== Analogues ===
Analogues of 25B-NBOH include 25B-NBOMe, 25I-NBOH, 25C-NBOH, and 2C-B, among others.

== History ==
25B-NBOH was first described in the scientific literature by Ralm Heim and colleagues by 2000. It was first encountered and described as a novel designer drug by 2016.

== Society and culture ==
=== Legal status ===
==== Canada ====
25B-NBOH is a controlled substance in Canada under phenethylamine blanket-ban language.

==== Sweden ====
The Riksdag added 25B-NBOH to Narcotic Drugs Punishments Act under Swedish Schedule I ("substances, plant materials and fungi which normally do not have medical use") as of January 26, 2016, published by Medical Products Agency (MPA) in regulation HSLF-FS 2015:35 listed as 25B-NBOH, and 2-([2-(4-bromo-2,5-dimetoxifenyl)etylamino]metyl)fenol.

==== United Kingdom ====
This substance is a Class A drug in the United Kingdom as a result of the N-benzylphenethylamine catch-all clause in the Misuse of Drugs Act 1971.

==== United States ====
25B-NBOH is not an explicitly controlled substance in the United States. However, it could be considered a controlled substance under the Federal Analogue Act if intended for human consumption.

== See also ==
- 25-NB (psychedelics)
- 25B-NBOMe
