= 25I-NBF =

Chemical compound

Clinical data
- ATC code: none

Legal status
- Legal status: BR: Class F2 (Prohibited psychotropics); DE: NpSG (Industrial and scientific use only); UK: Class A

Identifiers
- IUPAC name: 2-(4-iodo-2,5-dimethoxyphenyl)-N-[(2-fluorophenyl)methyl]ethan-1-amine
- CAS Number: 919797-21-0
- PubChem CID: 57469209
- ChemSpider: 24751866
- UNII: MR8FRH5W3C
- CompTox Dashboard (EPA): DTXSID00726753

Chemical and physical data
- Formula: C_{17}H_{19}FINO_{2}
- Molar mass: 415.247 g·mol^{−1}
- 3D model (JSmol): Interactive image
- SMILES: COc1cc(I)c(OC)cc1CCNCc2ccccc2F
- InChI: InChI=1S/C17H19FINO2/c1-21-16-10-15(19)17(22-2)9-12(16)7-8-20-11-13-5-3-4-6-14(13)18/h3-6,9-10,20H,7-8,11H2,1-2H3; Key:LPBKNBHMWRBPHT-UHFFFAOYSA-N

25I-NBF (2C-I-NBF, NBF-2C-I, Cimbi-21) is a derivative of the phenethylamine hallucinogen 2C-I, which acts as a highly potent partial agonist for the human 5-HT_{2A} receptor, with bias towards the β-arrestin 2 coupled signalling pathway. It has been studied in its ^{11}C radiolabelled form as a potential ligand for mapping the distribution of 5-HT_{2A} receptors in the brain, using positron emission tomography (PET).

== Society and culture ==
=== Legal status ===
25I-NBF is illegal in Hungary, Japan, Latvia, and Vermont.

==== Sweden ====
The Riksdag added 25I-NBF to Narcotic Drugs Punishments Act under Swedish schedule I ("substances, plant materials and fungi which normally do not have medical use") as of January 26, 2016, published by Medical Products Agency (MPA) in regulation HSLF-FS 2015:35 listed as 25I-NBF, and 2-(4-jodo-2,5-dimetoxifenyl)-N-(2-fluorobensyl)etanamin.

==== United Kingdom ====
This substance is a Class A drug in the United Kingdom as a result of the N-benzylphenethylamine catch-all clause in the Misuse of Drugs Act 1971.

== See also ==
- 25-NB (psychedelics)
