= 25I-NB3OMe =

Chemical compound

Clinical data
- ATC code: none

Legal status
- Legal status: UK: Class A drug

Identifiers
- IUPAC name: 2-(4-Iodo-2,5-dimethoxyphenyl)-N-[(3-methoxyphenyl)methyl]ethanamine
- CAS Number: 1566571-40-1
- PubChem CID: 118796422
- ChemSpider: 52085501
- UNII: 490QN6U1OF

Chemical and physical data
- Formula: C_{18}H_{22}INO_{3}
- Molar mass: 427.282 g·mol^{−1}
- 3D model (JSmol): Interactive image
- SMILES: COC1=CC=CC(=C1)CNCCC2=CC(=C(C=C2OC)I)OC
- InChI: InChI=1S/C18H22INO3/c1-21-15-6-4-5-13(9-15)12-20-8-7-14-10-18(23-3)16(19)11-17(14)22-2/h4-6,9-11,20H,7-8,12H2,1-3H3; Key:CJTZKPLDKCBUAF-UHFFFAOYSA-N

25I-NB3OMe (2C-I-NB3OMe, NB3OMe-2C-I) is a phenethylamine hallucinogen which acts as a partial agonist for the human 5-HT_{2A} receptor. It is a derivative of 2C-I.

== Legality ==
=== United Kingdom ===
This substance is a Class A drug in the United Kingdom as a result of the N-benzylphenethylamine catch-all clause in the Misuse of Drugs Act 1971.

=== United States ===
25I-NB3OMe is not explicitly listed as a controlled substance in the United States, but is a positional isomer of 25I-NBOMe and thus may be considered a Schedule I drug under the Federal Analogue Act, meaning that it would be subject to the same penalties for possession, distribution, and manufacture as 25I-NBOMe.
