= 25I-NB4OMe =

Chemical compound

Clinical data
- ATC code: none

Legal status
- Legal status: UK: Class A drug

Identifiers
- IUPAC name: 2-(4-Iodo-2,5-dimethoxyphenyl)-N-[(4-methoxyphenyl)methyl]ethanamine
- CAS Number: 1566571-41-2
- PubChem CID: 118796481
- ChemSpider: 52085624
- UNII: IVG065DV7J

Chemical and physical data
- Formula: C_{18}H_{22}INO_{3}
- Molar mass: 427.282 g·mol^{−1}
- 3D model (JSmol): Interactive image
- SMILES: COC1=CC=C(C=C1)CNCCC2=CC(=C(C=C2OC)I)OC
- InChI: InChI=1S/C18H22INO3.ClH/c1-21-15-6-4-13(5-7-15)12-20-9-8-14-10-18(23-3)16(19)11-17(14)22-2;/h4-7,10-11,20H,8-9,12H2,1-3H3;1H; Key:NWOROGLTELSWAZ-UHFFFAOYSA-N

25I-NB4OMe (2C-I-NB4OMe, NB4OMe-2C-I) is a derivative of the phenethylamine hallucinogen 2C-I, which acts as a partial agonist for the human 5-HT_{2A} receptor.

== Legality ==
=== United Kingdom ===
This substance is a Class A drug in the United Kingdom as a result of the N-benzylphenethylamine catch-all clause in the Misuse of Drugs Act 1971.
