= Clobenzorex =

Clinical data
- Other names: N-(2-chlorobenzyl)amphetamine
- AHFS/Drugs.com: International Drug Names
- Routes of administration: Oral
- ATC code: A08AA08 (WHO)

Legal status
- Legal status: BR: Class F2 (Prohibited psychotropics); CA: Schedule I; UK: Class B; US: Unscheduled

Identifiers
- IUPAC name: N-(2-chlorobenzyl)-1-phenylpropan-2-amine
- CAS Number: 13364-32-4
- PubChem CID: 71675
- ChemSpider: 64732
- UNII: 4A5352XI2A
- KEGG: D07115
- ChEMBL: ChEMBL1213251
- CompTox Dashboard (EPA): DTXSID7048409
- ECHA InfoCard: 100.033.108

Chemical and physical data
- Formula: C_{16}H_{18}ClN
- Molar mass: 259.78 g·mol^{−1}
- 3D model (JSmol): Interactive image
- SMILES: Clc1ccccc1CNC(C)Cc2ccccc2
- InChI: InChI=1S/C16H18ClN/c1-13(11-14-7-3-2-4-8-14)18-12-15-9-5-6-10-16(15)17/h2-10,13,18H,11-12H2,1H3; Key:LRXXRIXDSAEIOR-UHFFFAOYSA-N

Clobenzorex is a central nervous system stimulant and anorectic drug, chemically classified as an N-substituted amphetamine and a phenethylamine. Marketed by Aventis under the trade name Asenlix in India, Mexico, Honduras, and other parts of Latin America.

A prodrug of amphetamine, clobenzorex is metabolized within hours of ingestion into 4-hydroxyclobenzorex and, in smaller amounts, amphetamine.

== Chemistry ==
=== Synthesis ===
Thieme Synthesis: Patent: Radiolabelled:

Condensation between amphetamine (1) and 2-chlorobenzaldehyde (2) gives a Schiff-base, CID:135056236 (3). Subsequent reduction with sodium borohydride completed the synthesis of clobenzorex (4).

=== Urinalysis ===
Clobenzorex can be detected by urine drug screening. It is one of many drugs that can cause a positive result for amphetamine in urine drug screening. It may be differentiated from use of amphetamine itself through testing for metabolites such as 4-hydroxyclobenzorex or enantiomeric analysis.

== Legal status ==
=== Brazil ===
In Brazil, clobenzorex is a controlled prohibited psychotropic (class A3).

=== Canada ===
In Canada, clobenzorex is not specifically listed per the Controlled Drugs and Substances Act.

=== Mexico ===
In Mexico, clobenzorex is available for sale over the counter at many Mexican pharmacies under the primary brand Asenlix, as well as generic trade names like Dinintel, Finedal, Rexigen, Itravil, all of which are available via prescription in India, and OTC in Mexico and Honduras, typically used as an appetite suppressant.

=== United Kingdom ===
In the United Kingdom, clobenzorex is a controlled drug (class B).

=== United States ===
Clobenzorex is not controlled under the Controlled Substances Act of 1970 nor is it controlled under the Federal Analogue Act, as it is a derivative of benzphetamine. It is not subject to import controls and is legal to import and possess for personal medical use, provided all of the following conditions are met:

1. It is used to treat a condition with no FDA-approved medications or an orphan drug does not effectively treat a condition, and the risks of use have not been determined to outweigh to benefits of treatment;
2. is not being deceptively and unlawfully marketed; and
3. is part of an ongoing medical treatment plan that began in a foreign country.

=== World Anti-Doping Agency ===
The use of clobenzorex is banned by the World Anti-Doping Agency for use during sports competitions as an athletic performance enhancer ("doping").

== See also ==
- Substituted amphetamine
- Amfepramone
- Benzphetamine
- Lisdexamfetamine
- Mefenorex
- PEA-NBOMe
- Phendimetrazine
