= 25C-NB3OMe =

Chemical compound

Clinical data
- ATC code: none

Identifiers
- IUPAC name: 2-(4-Chloro-2,5-dimethoxyphenyl)-N-[(3-methoxyphenyl)methyl]ethanamine
- CAS Number: 1566571-34-3
- PubChem CID: 118796502
- ChemSpider: 52085462
- UNII: 6NH04YN8AH

Chemical and physical data
- Formula: C_{18}H_{22}ClNO_{3}
- Molar mass: 335.83 g·mol^{−1}
- 3D model (JSmol): Interactive image
- SMILES: COC1=CC=CC(=C1)CNCCC2=CC(=C(C=C2OC)Cl)OC
- InChI: InChI=1S/C18H22ClNO3/c1-21-15-6-4-5-13(9-15)12-20-8-7-14-10-18(23-3)16(19)11-17(14)22-2/h4-6,9-11,20H,7-8,12H2,1-3H3; Key:CSLNJUOCJZCEIR-UHFFFAOYSA-N

25C-NB3OMe (2C-C-NB3OMe, NB3OMe-2C-C) is a derivative of the phenethylamine hallucinogen 2C-C, which acts as a highly potent partial agonist for the human 5-HT_{2A} receptor.

== Legality ==
=== United Kingdom ===
This substance is a Class A drug in the United Kingdom as a result of the N-benzylphenethylamine catch-all clause in the Misuse of Drugs Act 1971.
