= 25I-NBMD =

Chemical compound

Clinical data
- Other names: NBMD-2C-I; Cimbi-29

Legal status
- Legal status: DE: NpSG (Industrial and scientific use only); UK: Class A

Identifiers
- IUPAC name: N-[(2H-1,3-benzodioxol-4-yl)methyl]-2-(4-iodo-2,5-dimethoxyphenyl)ethan-1-amine
- CAS Number: 919797-25-4
- PubChem CID: 57507899
- ChemSpider: 26234932
- UNII: R99110126K
- CompTox Dashboard (EPA): DTXSID70726967

Chemical and physical data
- Formula: C_{18}H_{20}INO_{4}
- Molar mass: 441.265 g·mol^{−1}
- 3D model (JSmol): Interactive image
- SMILES: c13OCOc3cccc1CNCCc(c(OC)cc2I)cc2OC
- InChI: InChI=1S/C18H20INO4/c1-21-16-9-14(19)17(22-2)8-12(16)6-7-20-10-13-4-3-5-15-18(13)24-11-23-15/h3-5,8-9,20H,6-7,10-11H2,1-2H3; Key:NJNMIPDEUMTYNV-UHFFFAOYSA-N

25I-NBMD (NBMD-2C-I, Cimbi-29) is a derivative of the phenethylamine hallucinogen 2C-I, discovered in 2006 by a team at Purdue University led by David Nichols. It acts as a potent partial agonist for the 5HT_{2A} receptor with a Ki of 0.049 nM at the human 5HT_{2A} receptor. The corresponding 4-bromo analogue 25B-NBMD has been used for molecular dynamics studies on the shape of the 5-HT_{2A} receptor.

== Society and culture ==
=== Legality ===
==== Sweden ====
The Riksdag added 25I-NBMD to Narcotic Drugs Punishments Act under swedish schedule I ("substances, plant materials and fungi which normally do not have medical use") as of January 16, 2015, published by Medical Products Agency (MPA) in regulation LVFS 2014:11 listed as 25I-NBMD, and 2-(4-jodo-2,5-dimetoxifenyl)-N-[(2,3-metylendioxifenyl)metyl]etanamin.

==== United Kingdom ====
This substance is a Class A drug in the United Kingdom as a result of the N-benzylphenethylamine catch-all clause in the Misuse of Drugs Act 1971.

== See also ==
- 25-NB (psychedelics)
