= 25C-NBOMe =

Psychedelic drug

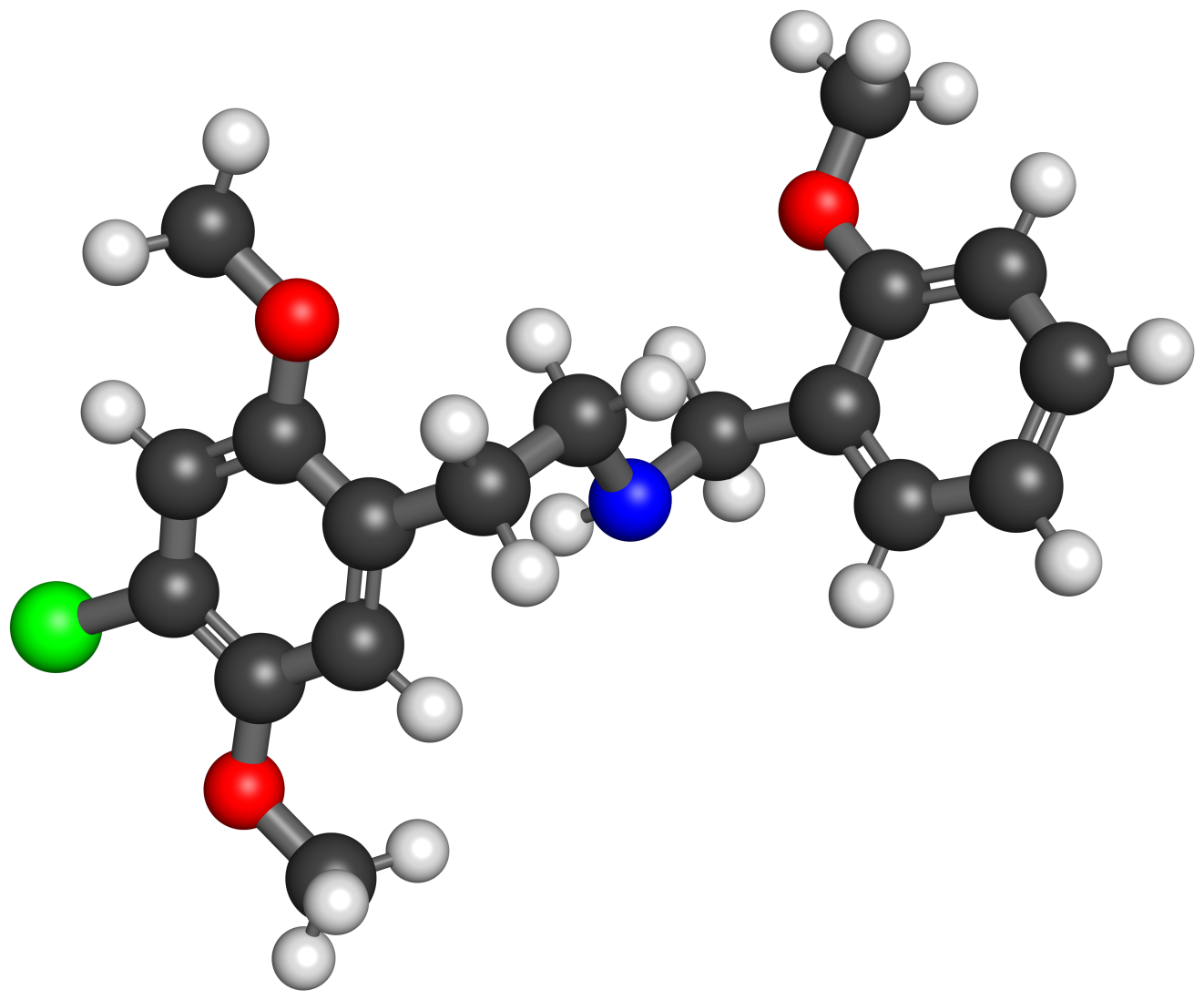

Clinical data
- Other names: NBOMe-2C-C; 2C-C-NBOMe; Cimbi-82; N-(2-Methoxybenzyl)-4-chloro-2,5-dimethoxyphenethylamine
- Routes of administration: Sublingual, others
- Drug class: Serotonin 5-HT_{2} receptor agonist; Serotonergic psychedelic; Hallucinogen
- ATC code: None

Legal status
- Legal status: BR: Class F2 (Prohibited psychotropics); DE: Anlage I (Authorized scientific use only); UK: Class A; US: Schedule I; UN: Psychotropic Schedule I

Identifiers
- IUPAC name: 2-(4-chloro-2,5-dimethoxyphenyl)-N-[(2-methoxyphenyl)methyl]ethan-1-amine
- CAS Number: 1227608-02-7
- PubChem CID: 46856354
- ChemSpider: 24583389
- UNII: 9FGW3C260N
- KEGG: C22720
- CompTox Dashboard (EPA): DTXSID10676790

Chemical and physical data
- Formula: C_{18}H_{22}ClNO_{3}
- Molar mass: 335.83 g·mol^{−1}
- 3D model (JSmol): Interactive image
- SMILES: COc2ccccc2CNCCc(cc1OC)c(OC)cc1Cl
- InChI: InChI=1S/C18H22ClNO3/c1-21-16-7-5-4-6-14(16)12-20-9-8-13-10-18(23-3)15(19)11-17(13)22-2/h4-7,10-11,20H,8-9,12H2,1-3H3; Key:FJFPOGCVVLUYAQ-UHFFFAOYSA-N

25C-NBOMe, also known as NBOMe-2C-C, 2C-C-NBOMe, or Cimbi-82, is a psychedelic drug and derivative of the psychedelic phenethylamine 2C-C. It acts as a potent agonist of the 5-HT_{2A} receptor, and has been studied in its ^{11}C radiolabelled form as a potential ligand for mapping the distribution of 5-HT_{2A} receptors in the brain, using positron emission tomography (PET). Multiple deaths have occurred from usage of 25C-NBOMe due to the ease of accidental overdose. The long-term toxic effects of the drug have not been researched. 25C-NBOMe was first described in the scientific literature by 2010.

== Use and effects ==
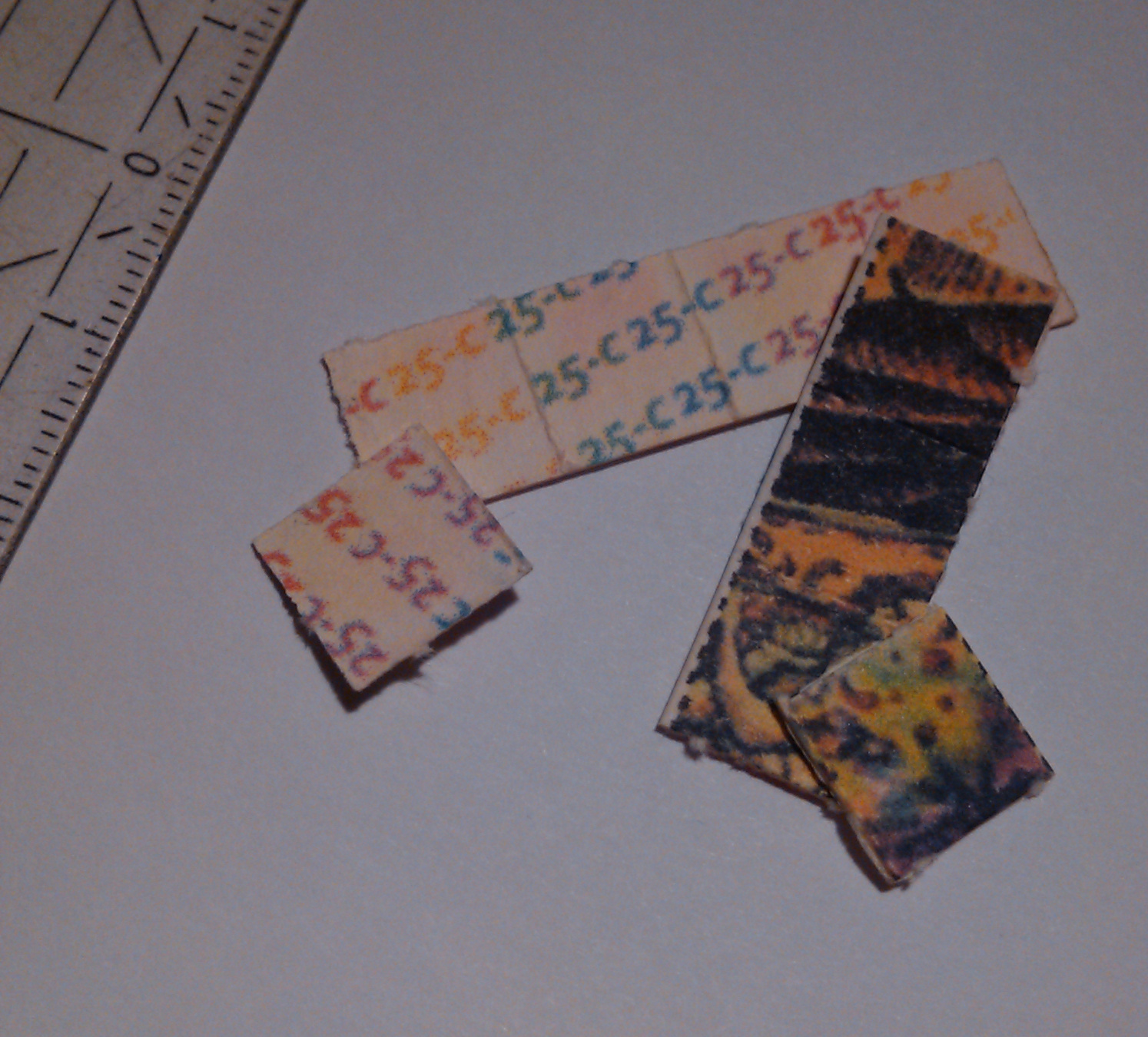
Blotter paper containing 25C-NBOMe

25C-NBOMe is extremely potent and the effects of the drug increase greatly within a small window of dose adjustment. Overdose may occur at as little as double an average dose. With inaccurate dosing of street blotter paper, when mistaken for LSD, or when taken as a powder or liquid, this has resulted in multiple accidental deaths.

One study has shown that 25C-NBOMe blotters have 'hotspots' of the drug and the dose is not evenly applied over the surface of the paper, which could lead to overdose. Sublingually, the threshold for the onset of hallucinogenic effects reportedly is about 100–250 μg, with mild effects at 250–450, strong effects at 450–800, and very strong effects over 800 μg.

NBOMe-substituted compounds have a diminished absorption rate passing through mucous membranes, but generally remain inactive when taken orally. Buccal, sublingual or insufflated routes of administration are all viable options. Absorption rate buccally and sublingually can be increased when complexed with HPBCD complexing sugar, however the most efficient is nasal administration, which shortens the duration while increasing intensity, but has been attributed to several overdoses and deaths.

== Toxicity and harm potential ==
NBOMe compounds are often associated with life-threatening toxicity and death. Studies on NBOMe family of compounds demonstrated that the substances exhibit neurotoxic and cardiotoxic activity. Reports of autonomic dysfunction remains prevalent with NBOMe compounds, with most individuals experiencing sympathomimetic toxicity such as vasoconstriction, hypertension and tachycardia in addition to hallucinations. Other symptoms of toxidrome include agitation or aggression, seizure, hyperthermia, diaphoresis, hypertonia, rhabdomyolysis, and death. Researchers report that NBOMe intoxication frequently display signs of serotonin syndrome. The likelihood of seizure is higher in NBOMes compared to other psychedelics.

NBOMe and NBOHs are regularly sold as LSD in blotter papers, which have a bitter taste and different safety profiles. Despite high potency, recreational doses of LSD have only produced low incidents of acute toxicity. Fatalities involved in NBOMe intoxication suggest that a significant number of individuals ingested the substance which they believed was LSD, and researchers report that "users familiar with LSD may have a false sense of security when ingesting NBOMe inadvertently". While most fatalities are due to the physical effects of the drug, there have also been reports of death due to self-harm and suicide under the influence of the substance.

Given limited documentation of NBOMe consumption, the long-term effects of the substance remain unknown. NBOMe compounds are not active orally, (Note: The potency of N-benzylphenethylamines via buccal, sublingual, or nasal absorption is 50- to 100-fold greater (by weight) than oral route compared to the parent 2C-x compounds. Researchers hypothesize the low oral metabolic stability of N-benzylphenethylamines is likely causing the low bioavailability on the oral route, although the metabolic profile of this compounds remains unpredictable; therefore researchers state that the fatalities linked to these substances may partly be explained by differences in the metabolism between individuals.) and are usually taken sublingually. When NBOMes are administered sublingually, numbness of the tongue and mouth followed by a metallic chemical taste was observed, and researchers describe this physical side effect as one of the main discriminants between NBOMe compounds and LSD.

=== Neurotoxic and cardiotoxic actions ===
Many of the NBOMe compounds have high potency agonist activity at additional 5-HT receptors and prolonged activation of 5-HT_{2B} can cause cardiac valvulopathy in high doses and chronic use. 5-HT_{2B} receptors have been strongly implicated in causing drug-induced valvular heart disease. The high affinity of NBOMe compounds for adrenergic α_{1} receptor has been reported to contribute to the stimulant-type cardiovascular effects.

In vitro studies, 25C-NBOMe has been shown to exhibit cytotoxicity on neuronal cell lines SH-SY5Y, PC12, and SN471, and the compound was more potent than methamphetamine at reducing the visibility of the respective cells; the neurotoxicity of the compound involves activation of MAPK/ERK cascade and inhibition of Akt/PKB signaling pathway. 25C-NBOMe, including the other derivative 25D-NBOMe, reduced the visibility of cardiomyocytes H9c2 cells, and both substances downregulated expression level of p21 (CDC24/RAC)-activated kinase 1 (PAK1), an enzyme with documented cardiac protective effects.

Preliminary studies on 25C-NBOMe have shown that the substance is toxic to development, heart health, and brain health in zebrafish, rats, and Artemia salina, a common organism for studying potential drug effects on humans, but more research is needed on the topic, the doses, and if the toxicology results apply to humans. Researchers of the study also recommended further investigation of the drug's potential in damaging pregnant women and their fetus due to the substance's damaging effects to development.

=== Emergency treatment ===
At present, there are no specific antidotes for NBOMes, and all acute intoxication is managed by symptomatic treatments, such as administration of benzodiazepines, antipsychotic drugs, and antiarrhythmic agents, such as beta blockers; some emergency interventions are intended to specifically treat rhabdomyolysis, which may lead to critical complications such as metabolic acidosis and acute kidney injury.

== Pharmacology ==
=== Pharmacodynamics ===
25C-NBOMe activities
Target	Affinity (K_{i}, nM)
5-HT_{1A}	2,353–>10,000
5-HT_{1B}	2,372–>10,000
5-HT_{1D}	1,024–1,109
5-HT_{1E}	5,776–>10,000
5-HT_{1F}	ND
5-HT_{2A}	0.7–1.6 (K_{i}); 1.46–150 (EC_{50}); 82–167% (E_{max})
5-HT_{2B}	1.05 (K_{i}); 100 (EC_{50}); 16% (E_{max})
5-HT_{2C}	2.54–5.4 (K_{i}); 3.24 (EC_{50}); 103% (E_{max})
5-HT_{3}	>10,000
5-HT_{4}	ND
5-HT_{5A}	4,796–>10,000
5-HT_{6}	36.2–36.3
5-HT_{7}	1,729–>10,000
α_{1A}	810–>10,000
α_{1B}	>10,000
α_{1D}	>10,000
α_{2A}	313–3,175
α_{2B}	224–871
α_{2C}	185–347
β_{1}	ND
β_{2}	2,630
β_{3}	>10,000
D_{1}	12,000
D_{2}	1,600–7,508
D_{3}	878–>10,000
D_{4}	2,018–>10,000
D_{5}	>10,000
H_{1}	65.3–90
H_{2}	1,230
H_{3}–H_{4}	ND
M_{1}–M_{3}	>10,000
M_{4}	5,410
M_{5}	>10,000
I_{1}	ND
σ_{1}	221–441
σ_{2}	41–79.4
MOR	653 (K_{i}); 10,000–>122,000 (EC_{50}) <5–82% (E_{max})
DOR	>10,000
KOR	525
TAAR1	15,000 (K_{i}) (mouse); 520 (K_{i}) (rat); 6,700 (EC_{50}) (mouse); 1,600 (EC_{50}) (rat) >10,000 (EC_{50}) (human); 48% (E_{max}) (mouse); 29% (E_{max}) (rat)
SERT	923–>10,000 (K_{i}); 7,300 (IC_{50}); ND (EC_{50})
NET	1,600–>10,000 (K_{i}); 5,900 (IC_{50}); ND (EC_{50})
DAT	14,000 (K_{i}); 70,000 (IC_{50}); ND (EC_{50})
Notes: The smaller the value, the more avidly the drug binds to the site. All proteins are human unless otherwise specified. Refs:

25C-NBOMe acts as a serotonin 5-HT_{2} receptor agonist, including of the serotonin 5-HT_{2A} receptor.

25C-NBOMe has been found to produce neurotoxicity in rodents. It has also been found to producing long-lasting social avoidance via hippocampal–prefrontal desynchrony when given repeatedly to adolescent rodents.

== Chemistry ==
25C-NBOMe is derived from the psychedelic phenethylamine 2C-C by substitution on the amine with a 2-methoxybenzyl group. 25C-NBOMe is a clumpy white powder with a notably bitter and metallic taste.

=== Analogues ===
Analogues of 25C-NBOMe include 2C-C, DOC, 25I-NBOMe, 25B-NBOMe, 25C-NBOH, 25C-NB3OMe, 25C-NB4OMe, and 25C-NBF, among others.

== History ==
25C-NBOMe was first described in the scientific literature by Anders Ettrup and colleagues by 2010.

== Society and culture ==
=== Recreational use ===
25C-NBOMe has been found on blotter mimics sold as LSD.

=== Legal status ===
==== Canada ====
As of October 31, 2016; 25C-NBOMe is a controlled substance (Schedule III) in Canada.

==== China ====
As of October 2015, 25C-NBOMe is a controlled substance in China.

==== Czech Republic ====
25C-NBOMe is banned in the Czech Republic.

==== Israel ====
The NBOMe series of psychoactives became controlled in Israel in May, 2013.

==== New Zealand ====
25C-NBOMe was sold as a designer drug in New Zealand in early 2012, but was withdrawn from sale after a statement by Associate Health Minister Peter Dunne that 25C-NBOMe would be considered to be substantially similar in chemical structure to the illegal hallucinogen DOB, and was therefore a Class C controlled drug analogue.

==== Russia ====
Russia became the first country to regulate the NBOME class. The entire NBOMe series of psychoactives became controlled in the Russian Federation starting October, 2011.

==== Sweden ====
Sveriges riksdag added 25C-NBOMe to schedule I ("substances, plant materials and fungi which normally do not have medical use") as narcotics in Sweden as of Aug 1, 2013, published by Medical Products Agency in their regulation LVFS 2013:15 listed as 25C-NBOMe 2-(4-kloro-2,5-dimetoxifenyl)-N-(2-metoxibensyl)etanamin.

==== United Kingdom ====
This substance is a Class A drug in the United Kingdom as a result of the N-benzylphenethylamine catch-all clause in the Misuse of Drugs Act 1971.

==== United States ====
Several NBOMe series compounds will be temporarily scheduled in the United States for 2 years. The temporary scheduling applies to 25C-NBOMe, 25B-NBOMe, and 25I-NBOMe. In November 2015, the temporary scheduling was extended for another year. Subsequently, they became permanently controlled.

== See also ==
- 25-NB (psychedelics)
