= 25I-NBOMe =

Synthetic hallucinogen

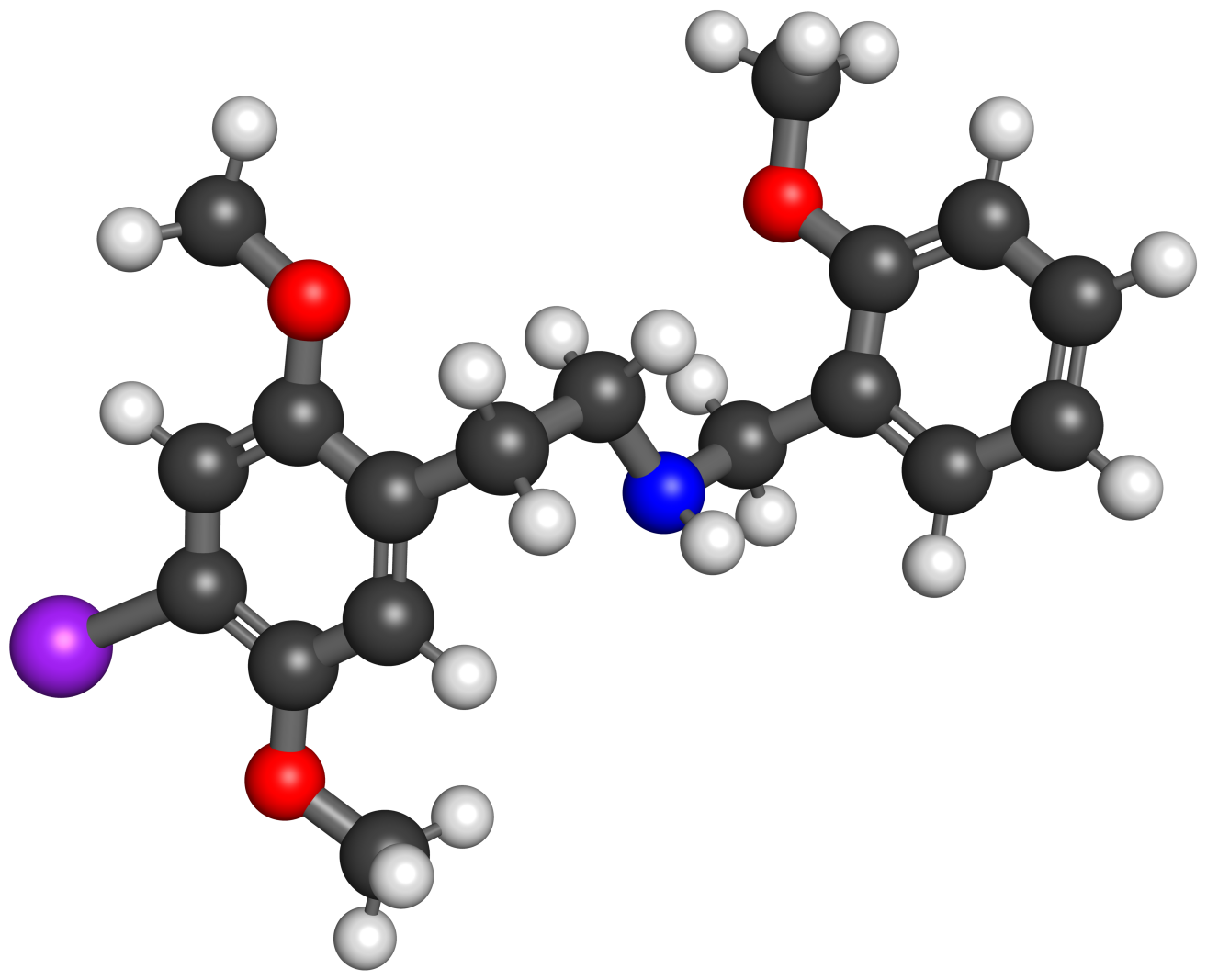

Clinical data
- Other names: 2C-I-NBOMe; 25I-NB2OMe; 25I; 25i; N-Bomb; Smiles; Wizard; INBMeO; Cimbi-5; Cimbi-5-2; N-(2-Methoxybenzyl)-4-iodo-2,5-dimethoxyphenethylamine; 4-Iodo-2,5-dimethoxy-N-(2-methoxybenzyl)phenethylamine
- Routes of administration: Mainly sublingual, buccal, and insufflation
- Drug class: Serotonin 5-HT_{2} receptor agonist; Serotonergic psychedelic; Hallucinogen
- ATC code: None

Legal status
- Legal status: BR: Class F2 (Prohibited psychotropics); CA: Schedule III; DE: Anlage I (Authorized scientific use only); UK: Class A; US: Schedule I; UN: Psychotropic Schedule I; EU: Controlled

Pharmacokinetic data
- Bioavailability: Very low
- Metabolism: Extensive first-pass metabolism in the liver
- Onset of action: 15–120 min (0.25–2 hours)
- Duration of action: Insufflation: 4–6 h Sublingual: 6–10 h Buccal: 6–10 h
- Excretion: Urine

Identifiers
- IUPAC name: 2-(4-iodo-2,5-dimethoxyphenyl)-N-[(2-methoxyphenyl)methyl]ethanamine
- CAS Number: 919797-19-6; hydrochloride: 1043868-97-8
- PubChem CID: 10251906
- ChemSpider: 8427392
- UNII: 547KGL06IP; hydrochloride: 0V30416N51
- KEGG: C22774
- ChEMBL: ChEMBL1908863
- CompTox Dashboard (EPA): DTXSID20238808

Chemical and physical data
- Formula: C_{18}H_{22}INO_{3}
- Molar mass: 427.282 g·mol^{−1}
- 3D model (JSmol): Interactive image
- SMILES: COC1=CC=CC=C1CNCCC2=CC(=C(C=C2OC)I)OC
- InChI: InChI=1S/C18H22INO3/c1-21-16-7-5-4-6-14(16)12-20-9-8-13-10-18(23-3)15(19)11-17(13)22-2/h4-7,10-11,20H,8-9,12H2,1-3H3; Key:ZFUOLNAKPBFDIJ-UHFFFAOYSA-N

25I-NBOMe, also known as 2C-I-NBOMe, Cimbi-5, and shortened to "25I", is a psychedelic drug of the phenethylamine, 2C, and NBOMe (25-NB) families. Since 2010, it has circulated in the recreational drug scene, often misrepresented as LSD. It is the most well-known member of the 25-NB family and the earliest member to be encountered as a novel recreational drug.

Street and media nicknames for this drug include "N-Bomb", "Solaris", "Smiles", and "Wizard", although the drug is frequently fraudulently sold as LSD.

Due to its physical effects and risk of overdose, there have been multiple deaths attributed to the drug. Its long-term toxicity is unknown due to lack of existing research.

25I-NBOMe was first described in 2000. It was first encountered as a novel recreational drug in 2010, and by 2012, NBOMes like 25I-NBOMe had surpassed other major psychedelics like LSD and psilocybin-containing mushrooms in popularity, at least for a time. 25I-NBOMe became a controlled substance in the United States in 2013.

== Use and effects ==
Although 25I-NBOMe was first described by 2000, it did not emerge as a common recreational drug until 2010, when it was first sold by vendors specializing in the supply of designer drugs. In a slang context, the name of the compound is often shortened to "25I" or is simply called "N-Bomb". According to a 2014 survey, 25I-NBOMe was the most frequently used of the NBOMe series. By 2013, case reports of 25I-NBOMe intoxication, with and without analytic confirmation of the drug in the body, were becoming increasingly common in the medical literature.

25I-NBOMe is widely rumored to be orally inactive; however, apparent overdoses have occurred via oral administration. Common routes of administration include sublingual, buccal, and intranasal. For sublingual and buccal administration, 25I-NBOMe is often applied to sheets of blotter paper of which small portions (tabs) are held in the mouth to allow absorption through the oral mucosa. There are reports of intravenous injection of 25I-NBOMe solution and smoking the drug in powdered form.

Due to its potency and much lower cost than so-called classical or traditional psychedelics, 25I-NBOMe blotters are frequently misrepresented as, or mistaken for LSD blotters. Even small quantities of 25I-NBOMe can produce a large number of blotters. Vendors would import 25I-NBOMe in bulk (e.g., 1 kg containers) and resell individual doses for a considerable profit.

=== Dosing ===
25I-NBOMe is potent, being active in sub-milligram doses. A common dose of the hydrochloride salt is 600–1,200 μg. The UK Advisory Council on the Misuse of Drugs states that a common dose is between 50 and 100 μg, although other sources indicate that these figures are incorrect; Erowid tentatively suggests that the threshold dose for humans is 50–250 μg, with a light dose between 200–600 μg, a common dose at 500–800 μg, and a strong dose at 700–1500 μg.

At this level of potency, it is not possible to accurately measure a single dose of 25I-NBOMe powder without an analytical balance, and attempting to do so may put the user at significant risk of overdose. There is a high risk of overdose due to the small margin between a high-dose and an over-dose, which is not a risk with the similar drug LSD. One study has shown that 25I-NBOMe blotters have 'hotspots' of the drug and the dose is not evenly applied over the surface of the paper, which could lead to overdose.

=== Effects ===
25I-NBOMe effects usually last 6–10 hours if taken sublingually, or buccally (between gum and cheek). When it is insufflated (snorted), effects usually last 4–6 hours.

25I-NBOMe has similar effects to LSD, though users report more negative effects while under the influence and more risk of harm following use as compared to the classical psychedelics.

Case reports of seven British males who presented to an emergency room following analytically confirmed 25I-NBOMe intoxication suggest the following potential adverse effects: "tachycardia (n = 7), hypertension (4), agitation (6), aggression, visual and auditory hallucinations (6), seizures (3), hyperpyrexia (3), clonus (2), elevated white blood cell count (2), elevated creatine kinase (7), metabolic acidosis (3), and acute kidney injury (1)."

25I-NBOMe can be consumed in liquid, powder or paper form and can be snorted, injected, mixed with food, or smoked, but sublingual administration is most common.

== Toxicity and harm potential ==
NBOMe compounds are often associated with life-threatening toxicity and death. Studies on NBOMe family of compounds demonstrated that the substances exhibit neurotoxic and cardiotoxic activity. Reports of autonomic dysfunction remains prevalent with NBOMe compounds, with most individuals experiencing sympathomimetic toxicity such as vasoconstriction, hypertension and tachycardia in addition to hallucinations. Other symptoms of toxidrome include agitation or aggression, seizure, hyperthermia, diaphoresis, hypertonia, rhabdomyolysis, and death. Researchers report that NBOMe intoxication frequently display signs of serotonin syndrome. The likelihood of seizure is higher in NBOMes compared to other psychedelics.

NBOMe and NBOHs are regularly sold as LSD in blotter papers, which have a bitter taste and different safety profiles. Despite high potency, recreational doses of LSD have only produced low incidents of acute toxicity. Fatalities involved in NBOMe intoxication suggest that a significant number of individuals ingested the substance which they believed was LSD, and researchers report that "users familiar with LSD may have a false sense of security when ingesting NBOMe inadvertently". While most fatalities are due to the physical effects of the drug, there have also been reports of death due to self-harm and suicide under the influence of the substance.

Given limited documentation of NBOMe consumption, the long-term effects of the substance remain unknown. NBOMe compounds are not active orally, (Note: The potency of N-benzylphenethylamines via buccal, sublingual, or nasal absorption is 50- to 100-fold greater (by weight) than oral route compared to the parent 2C-x compounds. Researchers hypothesize the low oral metabolic stability of N-benzylphenethylamines is likely causing the low bioavailability on the oral route, although the metabolic profile of this compounds remains unpredictable; therefore researchers state that the fatalities linked to these substances may partly be explained by differences in the metabolism between individuals.) and are usually taken sublingually. When NBOMes are administered sublingually, numbness of the tongue and mouth followed by a metallic chemical taste was observed, and researchers describe this physical side effect as one of the main discriminants between NBOMe compounds and LSD.

=== Neurotoxic and cardiotoxic actions ===
Many of the NBOMe compounds have high potency agonist activity at additional 5-HT receptors and prolonged activation of 5-HT_{2B} can cause cardiac valvulopathy in high doses and chronic use. 5-HT_{2B} receptors have been strongly implicated in causing drug-induced valvular heart disease. The high affinity of NBOMe compounds for adrenergic α_{1} receptor has been reported to contribute to the stimulant-type cardiovascular effects.

In vitro studies, 25C-NBOMe has been shown to exhibit cytotoxicity on neuronal cell lines SH-SY5Y, PC12, and SN471, and the compound was more potent than methamphetamine at reducing the visibility of the respective cells; the neurotoxicity of the compound involves activation of MAPK/ERK cascade and inhibition of Akt/PKB signaling pathway. 25C-NBOMe, including the other derivative 25D-NBOMe, reduced the visibility of cardiomyocytes H9c2 cells, and both substances downregulated expression level of p21 (CDC24/RAC)-activated kinase 1 (PAK1), an enzyme with documented cardiac protective effects.

Preliminary studies on 25C-NBOMe have shown that the substance is toxic to development, heart health, and brain health in zebrafish, rats, and Artemia salina, a common organism for studying potential drug effects on humans, but more research is needed on the topic, the doses, and if the toxicology results apply to humans. Researchers of the study also recommended further investigation of the drug's potential in damaging pregnant women and their fetus due to the substance's damaging effects to development.

=== Emergency treatment ===
At present, there are no specific antidotes for NBOMes, and all acute intoxication is managed by symptomatic treatments, such as administration of benzodiazepines, antipsychotic drugs, and antiarrhythmic agents, such as beta blockers; some emergency interventions are intended to specifically treat rhabdomyolysis, which may lead to critical complications such as metabolic acidosis and acute kidney injury.

=== Attributed deaths ===
Reports of deaths and significant injuries have been attributed to the use of 25I-NBOMe, prompting some governments to control its possession, production, and sale. The website Erowid states that 25I-NBOMe is extremely potent and should not be snorted, and that the drug "appears to have led to several deaths in the past year." Several non-fatal overdoses requiring prolonged hospitalization have also been reported.

As of August 2015, 25I-NBOMe has reportedly led to at least 19 overdose deaths in the United States. In June 2012, two teens in Grand Forks, North Dakota and East Grand Forks, Minnesota fatally overdosed on a substance that was allegedly 25I-NBOMe, resulting in lengthy sentences for two of the parties involved and a Federal indictment against the Texas-based online vendor. A 21-year-old man from Little Rock, Arkansas died in October 2012 after taking a liquid drop of the drug nasally at a music festival. He was reported to have consumed caffeinated alcoholic beverages for "several hours" beforehand. It is unclear what other drugs he may have consumed, as autopsies generally do not test for the presence of research chemicals. In January 2013, an 18-year-old in Scottsdale, Arizona, died after consuming 25I-NBOMe sold as LSD; a toxicology screening found no other drugs in the person's system. The drug is the suspected cause of death in another Scottsdale, Arizona, incident in April 2013. It is also cited in the death of a 21-year-old woman in August 2013 and the death of a 17-year-old in Minnesota in January 2014, as well as the death of a 15-year old in Washington in September 2014. In October 2015, a 20-year-old UCSB student from Isla Vista, California died of "acute hallucinogenic polysubstance intoxication" with an additional significant cause of death being "sharp force trauma of the upper extremity", according to a statement from Santa Barbara County Sheriff's office; the autopsy determined Sanchez was under the influence of two hallucinogenic drugs at the time of his death: ketamine and 25I-NBOMe. The noted sharp force trauma refers to a deep cut on Sanchez's right forearm, which was caused when he punched and broke a large residential window while suffering hallucinations.

25I-NBOMe has been implicated in multiple deaths in Australia. In March 2012, a man in Australia died from injuries sustained by running into trees and power poles while intoxicated by 25I-NBOMe. A Sydney teenager jumped off a balcony to his death on June 5, 2013, while on 25I-NBOMe.

In July 2015, 25I-NBOMe was involved in the death of 18-year-old Liam Miller in York, England. Miller was stabbed 32 times by his close friend, Samuel Donley, during a psychotic episode after both had ingested the drug. Donley also attacked a passer-by and inflicted self-injuries before being detained. He pleaded guilty to manslaughter on the grounds of diminished responsibility and was sentenced to six years and eight months in prison. The court described the incident as a "drug-crazed frenzy" and highlighted the extreme psychological effects associated with 25I-NBOMe.

25I-NBOMe has been linked to a major case on January 20, 2016, in Cork, Ireland, which left six teenagers hospitalized, one of whom later died. At least one of the teenagers suffered a cardiac arrest, according to reports, along with extreme internal bleeding.

At least one suicide, and two attempted suicides leading to hospitalisation, have occurred while under the effects of 25I-NBOMe.

== Interactions ==
2C drugs like 2C-I are metabolized by the monoamine oxidase (MAO) enzymes, including both MAO-A and MAO-B. As a result, 2C drugs may be potentiated by monoamine oxidase inhibitors (MAOIs), such as phenelzine, tranylcypromine, moclobemide, and selegiline. This has the potential to lead to overdose and serious toxicity. In contrast to 2C drugs, 25I-NBOMe has been found not to be metabolized by MAO-A or MAO-B and instead only by cytochrome P450 enzymes. Other 25-NB drugs besides 25I-NBOMe were not assessed.

== Pharmacology ==
=== Pharmacodynamics ===
25I-NBOMe activities
| Target | Affinity (K_{i}, nM) |
|---|---|
| 5-HT_{1A} | 85–2,089 |
| 5-HT_{1B} | 3,742–>10,000 |
| 5-HT_{1D} | 533–562 |
| 5-HT_{1E} | >10,000 |
| 5-HT_{1F} | ND |
| 5-HT_{2A} | 0.044–2.2 (K_{i}); 0.35–240 (EC_{50}); 27–142% (E_{max}) |
| 5-HT_{2B} | 1.4–231 (K_{i}); 3.4–130 (EC_{50}); 32–80% (E_{max}) |
| 5-HT_{2C} | 0.43–7.0 (K_{i}); 0.098–41.7 (EC_{50}); 70–124% (E_{max}) |
| 5-HT_{3} | >10,000 |
| 5-HT_{4} | ND |
| 5-HT_{5A} | 2,200–>10,000 |
| 5-HT_{6} | 32–73 |
| 5-HT_{7} | 1,542–>10,000 |
| α_{1A} | 370–1,047 |
| α_{1B} | 1,928 |
| α_{1D} | 912 |
| α_{2A} | 157–1,106 |
| α_{2B} | 646 |
| α_{2C} | 348–617 |
| β_{1} | ND |
| β_{2} | 1,189 |
| β_{3} | 3,673 |
| D_{1} | 3,718–6,700 |
| D_{2} | 900–1,600 |
| D_{3} | 117–2,100 |
| D_{4} | 269–647 |
| D_{5} | 7,847 |
| H_{1} | 36.3–90 |
| H_{2} | 692 |
| H_{3} | >500 |
| H_{4} | ND |
| M_{1}–M_{4} | >10,000 |
| M_{5} | 1,381 |
| I_{1} | ND |
| σ_{1} | 66.8 |
| σ_{2} | 35.1 |
| MOR | 82–155 (K_{i}); 880–2,740 (EC_{50}); 23–97% (E_{max}) |
| DOR | 1,462 |
| KOR | 122–288 |
| TAAR1 | 3,400–4,000 (K_{i}) (mouse); 440 (K_{i}) (rat); 5,200 (EC_{50}) (mouse); 1,800 (EC_{50}) (rat) >10,000 (EC_{50}) (human); 17% (E_{max}) (mouse); 32% (E_{max}) (rat) |
| SERT | 1,000–1,009 (K_{i}); 4,000–6,800 (IC_{50}); ND (EC_{50}) |
| NET | 1,300–4,574 (K_{i}); 10,000–11,000 (IC_{50}); ND (EC_{50}) |
| DAT | 5,031–5,400 (K_{i}); 53,000–65,000 (IC_{50}); ND (EC_{50}) |
Notes: The smaller the value, the more avidly the drug binds to the site. All proteins are human unless otherwise specified. Refs:

25I-NBOMe acts as a highly potent full agonist for the human 5-HT_{2A} receptor, with a affinity (K_{i}) of 0.044 nM, making it some 16-fold higher affinity than 2C-I at this receptor. 25I-NBOMe induces a head-twitch response in mice which is blocked completely by a selective 5-HT_{2A} antagonist, suggesting its psychedelic effects are mediated by 5-HT_{2A}. This study suggested that 25I-NBOMe is approximately 14-fold more potent than 2C-I in-vivo. While in-vitro studies showed that N-benzyl derivatives of 2C-I were significantly increased in potency compared to 2C-I, the N-benzyl derivatives of the related compound DOI were inactive. 25B-NBOMe is a low-potency weak partial agonist of the rat and mouse trace amine-associated receptor 1 (TAAR1) but is inactive at the human TAAR1.

The affinities and potencies of 25I-NBOMe at the serotonin 5-HT_{2} receptors have varied in different studies. Its affinities (K_{i}) have ranged from 0.044 to 0.6 nM for the serotonin 5-HT_{2A} receptor, 1.91 to 130 nM for the serotonin 5-HT_{2B} receptor, and 1.03 to 4.6 nM for the serotonin 5-HT_{2C} receptor. Conversely, its potencies (EC_{50}) have ranged from 0.76 to 240 nM at the serotonin 5-HT_{2A} receptor, 111 to 130 nM at the serotonin 5-HT_{2B} receptor, and 2.38 to 88.9 nM at the serotonin 5-HT_{2C} receptor. The drug shows biased agonism at the serotonin 5-HT_{2C} receptor.

25I-NBOMe also has weaker interactions with multiple other receptors. K_{d} values for interaction with the following targets were greater than 500 nM: 5-HT_{1A}, D_{3}, H_{2}, 5-HT_{1D}, α_{1A} adrenergic, δ opioid, serotonin uptake transporter, 5-HT_{5A}, 5-HT_{1B}, D_{2}, 5-HT_{7}, D_{1}, 5-HT_{3}, 5-HT_{1E}, D_{5}, muscarinic M_{1}-M_{5}, H_{3}, and the dopamine uptake transporter. 25I-NBOMe is inactive as a monoamine reuptake inhibitor and releasing agent. However, 25I-NBOMe has been found to increase dopamine release from mouse striatal synaptosomes similarly to methamphetamine in vitro. Likewise, 25I-NBOMe has been found to increase dopamine levels in the nucleus accumbens in rodents in vivo.

25I-NBOMe has been found to produce neurotoxicity in rodents.

A radiolabelled form of 25I-NBOMe can be used for mapping the distribution of 5-HT_{2A} receptors in the brain.

=== Pharmacokinetics ===
25I-NBOMe is metabolized by the cytochrome P450 enzymes CYP3A4 and CYP2D6. It does not appear to be metabolized by the monoamine oxidase (MAO) enzymes MAO-A or MAO-B.

== Chemistry ==
Like other 2C-X-NBOMe molecules, 25I-NBOMe is a derivative of the 2C family of phenethylamines described by chemist Alexander Shulgin in his book PiHKAL. Specifically, 25I-NBOMe is an N-benzyl derivative of the phenethylamine molecule 2C-I, formed by adding a 2-methoxybenzyl (BnOMe) onto the nitrogen (N) of the phenethylamine backbone. This substitution significantly increases the potency of the molecule.

=== Synthesis ===
25I-NBOMe is usually synthesised from 2C-I and 2-methoxybenzaldehyde, via reductive alkylation. It can be done stepwise by first making the imine and then reducing the formed imine with sodium borohydride, or by direct reaction with sodium triacetoxyborohydride.

=== Analogues ===
Analogues of 25I-NBOMe include 2C-I, DOI, 25B-NBOMe, 25C-NBOMe, 25I-NBOH, 25I-NB3OMe, 25I-NBMD, 25I-NB4OMe, 25I-NB34MD, 25I-NBF, and DOI-NBOMe, among others.

The carbon-11 labelled version of 25I-NBOMe, [^{11}C]Cimbi-5, was synthesized and validated as a radiotracer for positron emission tomography (PET) in Copenhagen. Being the first 5-HT_{2A} receptor full agonist PET radioligand, [^{11}C]CIMBI-5 shows promise as a more functional marker of these receptors, particularly in their high affinity states.

== History ==
25I-NBOMe was first described in the scientific literature, in the form of conference abstracts, by Ralf Heim and colleagues at the Free University of Berlin by 2000. Then, in 2003, Heim described 25I-NBOMe in his dissertation. 25I-NBOMe was further investigated by a team at Purdue University led by David Nichols in 2006 through 2008. 25I-NBOMe was encountered as a novel recreational drug by 2010, and by 2012, NBOMe drugs like 25I-NBOMe had eclipsed other psychedelics like LSD and psilocybin-containing mushrooms in popularity, at least for a time. 25I-NBOMe became a Schedule I controlled substance in the United States in 2013.

== Society and culture ==
=== Legal status ===
==== Australia ====
25I-NBOMe was explicitly scheduled in Queensland drug law in April 2012, and in New South Wales in October 2013, as were some related compounds such as 25B-NBOMe. The Australian federal government has no specific legislation concerning any of the N-benzyl phenethylamines.

==== Brazil ====
All drugs in the NBOMe family, including 25I-NBOMe, are illegal.

==== Canada ====
As of October 31, 2016; 25I-NBOMe is a controlled substance (Schedule III) in Canada.

==== China ====
As of October 2015 25I-NBOMe is a controlled substance in China.

==== European Union ====
In September 2014 the European Union implemented a ban of 25I-NBOMe in all its member states.

==== Finland ====
25I-NBOMe is scheduled in government decree on narcotic substances, preparations and plants as of 2022 and is hence illegal to possess or use.

==== Israel ====
Israel banned 25I-NBOMe in 2013.

==== Romania ====
In 2011, Romania banned all psychoactive substances.

==== Russia ====
Russia was the first country to pass specific regulations on the NBOMe series. All drugs in the NBOMe series, including 25I-NBOMe, became illegal in Russia in October 2011.

==== Serbia ====
25I-NBOMe was put on the list of prohibited substances in March 2015.

==== Sweden ====
The Riksdag added 25I-NBOMe to Narcotic Drugs Punishments Act under Swedish schedule I ("substances, plant materials and fungi which normally do not have medical use") as of August 1, 2013, published by Medical Products Agency (MPA) in regulation LVFS 2013:15 listed as 25I-NBOMe, and 2-(4-jodo-2,5-dimetoxifenyl)-N-(2-metoxibensyl)etanamin.

==== Taiwan ====
Following the European rule from 2014, 25I-NBOMe was put in class 4 of prohibited substances.

==== United Arab Emirates ====
The UAE has a zero-tolerance policy for recreational use of drugs. Federal Law No. 14 of 1995 criminalises production, import, export, transport, buying, selling, possessing, storing of narcotic and psychotropic substances (Including 25i-NBOMe) unless done so as part of supervised and regulated medical or scientific activities in accordance with the applicable laws. The UAE police has dedicated departments to deal with drugs' issues.

==== United Kingdom ====
This substance is a Class A drug in the United Kingdom as a result of the N-benzylphenethylamine catch-all clause in the Misuse of Drugs Act 1971.

==== United States ====
On Nov 15, 2013, the DEA added 25I-NBOMe (and 25C-, and 25B-NBOMe) to Schedule I using their emergency scheduling powers, making those NBOMe compounds "temporarily" in Schedule I for 2 years. In November 2015, the temporary scheduling was extended for an additional year while permanent scheduling was arranged. 25I-NBOMe, 25B-NBOMe and 25C-NBOMe are currently Schedule 1 Substances according to 21 CFR 1308.11(d).

== See also ==
- 25-NB (psychedelics)
