= 25I-NBOH =

Chemical compound

Clinical data
- Other names: NBOH-2-CI; Cimbi-27; 2C-I-NBOH; N-(2-Hydroxybenzyl)-4-iodo-2,5-dimethoxyphenethylamine
- Routes of administration: Sublingual, buccal
- Drug class: Serotonin 5-HT_{2} receptor agonist; Serotonergic psychedelic; Hallucinogen

Legal status
- Legal status: BR: Class F2 (Prohibited psychotropics); DE: NpSG (Industrial and scientific use only); UK: Class A

Identifiers
- IUPAC name: 2-((2-(4-Iodo-2,5-dimethoxyphenyl)ethylamino)methyl)phenol
- CAS Number: 919797-20-9
- PubChem CID: 10001761
- ChemSpider: 8177342
- UNII: W9G4BGW8K4
- CompTox Dashboard (EPA): DTXSID80433993

Chemical and physical data
- Formula: C_{17}H_{20}INO_{3}
- Molar mass: 413.255 g·mol^{−1}
- 3D model (JSmol): Interactive image
- SMILES: Oc2ccccc2CNCCc(c(OC)cc1I)cc1OC
- InChI: InChI=1S/C17H20INO3/c1-21-16-10-14(18)17(22-2)9-12(16)7-8-19-11-13-5-3-4-6-15(13)20/h3-6,9-10,19-20H,7-8,11H2,1-2H3; Key:FEUZHYRXGQTBRO-UHFFFAOYSA-N

25I-NBOH, also known as N-(2-hydroxybenzyl)-4-iodo-2,5-dimethoxyphenethylamine, is a psychedelic drug of the phenethylamine, 2C, and N-benzylphenethylamine families related to 2C-I and 25I-NBOMe. It was discovered in 2006 by a team at Purdue University. The drug is a known metabolite of 25I-NBOMe and has also been encountered as a novel designer drug.

== Use and effects ==
The dose range of 25I-NBOH is 300 to 1,000 μg, with an estimated typical dose of 700 μg. The route of administration is sublingual or buccal.

== Pharmacology ==
=== Pharmacodynamics ===
25I-NBOH activities
Target	Affinity (K_{i}, nM)
5-HT_{1A}	2,220–>10,000 (K_{i}); 37,000 (EC_{50}); 74% (E_{max})
5-HT_{1B}	2,446
5-HT_{1D}	1,277
5-HT_{1E}	>10,000
5-HT_{1F}	ND
5-HT_{2A}	0.061–1.12 (K_{i}); 0.074–1.52 (EC_{50}); 86–136% (E_{max})
5-HT_{2B}	1.9–2.8 (K_{i}); 111 (EC_{50}); 21% (E_{max})
5-HT_{2C}	0.13–1.4 (K_{i}); 2.4–32 (EC_{50}); 94–101% (E_{max})
5-HT_{3}	>10,000
5-HT_{4}	ND
5-HT_{5A}	965
5-HT_{6}	111
5-HT_{7}	3,472
α_{1A}	3,924
α_{1B}	>10,000
α_{1D}	>10,000
α_{2A}	2,257
α_{2B}	3,043
α_{2C}	1,003
β_{1}	1,088
β_{2}, β_{3}	ND
D_{1}	ND
D_{2}	>10,000
D_{3}	678
D_{4}	844
D_{5}	>10,000
H_{1}, H_{2}	ND
H_{3}	>10,000
H_{4}	ND
M_{1}–M_{5}	>10,000
I_{1}	ND
σ_{1}	160
σ_{2}	264
MOR	47 (K_{i}); 1,330–23,400 (EC_{50}); 16–55% (E_{max})
DOR	ND
KOR	328
TAAR1	ND
SERT	1,155–1,220 (K_{i}); 1,720 (IC_{50}); Inactive (EC_{50})
NET	4,060 (K_{i}); 629 (IC_{50}); Inactive (EC_{50})
DAT	8,500 (K_{i}); 30,700 (IC_{50}); Inactive (EC_{50})
Notes: The smaller the value, the more avidly the drug binds to the site. All proteins are human unless otherwise specified. Refs:

25I-NBOH acts as a potent agonist of the 5-HT_{2A} receptor, with a K_{i} of 0.061 nM at the human 5-HT_{2A} receptor, similar to the better-known compound 25I-NBOMe, making it some twelve times the potency of 2C-I itself.

Although in vitro tests show this compound acts as an agonist, animal studies to confirm these findings have not been reported. While the N-benzyl derivatives of 2C-I had significantly increased binding to 5-HT_{2A} receptor fragments, compared to 2C-I, the N-benzyl derivatives of DOI, such as DOI-NBOMe, were less active compared to DOI.

25I-NBOH is notable in having been found to be one of the most selective agonists of the serotonin 5-HT_{2A} receptor known, with an EC_{50} value of 0.074 nM and with more than 400-fold selectivity over the serotonin 5-HT_{2C} receptor. However, in another study, it only had about 6-fold selectivity for the serotonin 5-HT_{2A} receptor over the serotonin 5-HT_{2C} receptor.

25I-NBOH produces the head-twitch response, a behavioral proxy of psychedelic-like effects, in rodents.

== Chemistry ==
=== Analysis ===
25I-NBOH is a labile molecule which fragments into 2C-I when analyzed by routine gas chromatography (GC) methods. A specific method for reliable identification of 25I-NBOH using GC/MS has been reported, allowing forensic forces worldwide to correctly identify this compound.

=== Analogues ===
Analogues of 25I-NBOH include 2C-I, DOI, 25B-NBOH, 25C-NBOH, 25I-NBOMe, 25I-NB3OMe, 25I-NBMD, 25I-NB4OMe, 25I-NB34MD, 25I-NBF, and DOI-NBOMe, among others.

== History ==
25I-NBOH was first described in the scientific literature by Ralm Heim and colleagues by 2000.

== Society and culture ==
=== Legal status ===
==== Canada ====
25I-NBOH is a controlled substance in Canada under phenethylamine blanket-ban language.

==== Sweden ====
The Riksdag added 25I-NBOH to Narcotic Drugs Punishments Act under Swedish schedule I ("substances, plant materials and fungi which normally do not have medical use") as of August 18, 2015, published by Medical Products Agency MPA) in regulation HSLF-FS 2015:12 listed as "25I-NBOH" and "2-([2-(4-jodo-2,5-dimetoxifenyl)etylamino]metyl)fenol".

==== United Kingdom ====
This substance is a Class A drug in the United Kingdom as a result of the N-benzylphenethylamine catch-all clause in the Misuse of Drugs Act 1971.

==== United States ====
25I-NBOH is not an explicitly controlled substance in the United States. However, it could be considered a controlled substance under the Federal Analogue Act if intended for human consumption.

== See also ==
- 25-NB (psychedelics)
- 25I-NBOMe
