= N-bomb =

N-bomb may refer to:

- N-word (euphemisms)
- Neutron bomb
- Nuclear weapon
- 2C-I-NBOMe (psychedelic drug)
