= Arthur S. Tischler =

American scientist and medical doctor

Arthur S. Tischler (born 1946) is an American surgical pathologist and professor of pathology at Tufts University School of Medicine. He is best known for his research on catecholamine-producing neuroendocrine tumors, particularly pheochromocytoma and paraganglioma.

== Career ==
Tischler completed his medical training and pathology residency at Beth Israel Deaconness Medical Center and Harvard Medical School in Boston (1971–1976), serving as Chief Resident in 1976. He then worked as a pathologist at Walter Reed Army Medical Center (1976–1978), before joining Tufts Medical Center.

At Tufts, he became a senior pathologist and professor of pathology and laboratory medicine.

== Research ==
Tischler's early research helped establish that pheochromocytoma cells could undergo neuron-like differentiation in response to nerve growth factor (NGF).

In 1976, he and Lloyd Greene co-developed the widely used PC12 cell line.

He later co-developed MPC cell lines from genetically modified mice to study neuroendocrine tumors.

In 2020, he co-developed RS0, the first SDHB-mutant, SDH-deficient pheochromocytoma model.

== Leadership and editorial roles ==
Tischler served as President of the Endocrine Pathology Society (2001–2002) and was Editor-in-Chief of Endocrine Pathology (2002–2008). He is also a founding member of the Pheochromocytoma Research Support Organization (PRESSOR), where he co-chaired the tumor models working group.

== International classification work ==
Tischler has contributed to the World Health Organization (WHO) classification of endocrine tumors, authoring chapters in the 2004, 2017, and 2024 editions. He also leads the expert panel on pheochromocytomas and paragangliomas for the International Collaboration on Cancer Reporting (ICCR).

== Recognition ==
- 2000 – Founding member of PRESSOR
- 2011 – Science Honoree, PheoPara Alliance
- 2025 – Lifetime Achievement Award, Endocrine Pathology Society

== Research collaborations ==
Tischler contributed to the Cancer Genome Atlas (TCGA) pheochromocytoma/ paraganglioma study, and is a collaborator in the Australian-Asian-American Adrenal Alliance (A5).

== Selected publications ==
- Tischler AS, Greene LA. "Nerve growth factor-induced process formation by cultured rat pheochromocytoma cells." Nature. 1975.
- Greene LA, Tischler AS. "Establishment of a noradrenergic clonal line of rat adrenal pheochromocytoma cells..." PNAS. 1976.
- Powers JF, et al. "A xenograft and cell line model of SDH-deficient pheochromocytoma..." Endocrine-Related Cancer. 2020.
