= Dorris J. Hutchison =

American scientist researching chemotherapy drugs

- Born: October 31, 1918; Carrsville, Kentucky
- Died: May 9, 2007 (aged 88); Westerly, Rhode Island
- Education: Western Kentucky University
- Occupation: Development of cancer chemotherapy
- Known for: President, New York Society of Kentucky Women

Dorris Hutchison (October 31, 1918 – May 9, 2007) was an American scientist primarily known for her studies on the development of cancer chemotherapy drugs. Her work has been crucial for the advancement of new treatments for leukemia.

== Early life ==
Hutchison was born in Carrsville, Lexington County, Kentucky on October 31, 1918, the daughter of John and Maud Hutchison. Her father was a merchant. She grew up in a rural area by the Ohio River and attended a four-room schoolhouse. Hutchison said that her interest in science grew from her explorations on the river.

== Education ==
Hutchison attended Western Kentucky University in Bowling Green on a scholarship to study Bacteriology. Hutchison served as a laboratory assistant for L.Y. Lancaster while completing her undergraduate degree at Western. She received her master's degree at the University of Kentucky in bacteriology in 1943 and her doctorate at Rutgers University in 1949 in the laboratory of Selman Waksman. Working with Waksman, Hutchison devised methods for the production and isolation of streptomycin and neomycin as anti tuberculosis agents. Hutchison later taught microbiology at Russell Sage College. At Russel Sage, Dr. Hutchison met Dr. Selman Waksman who urged her to teach at Vassar College and later offered her a position as a graduate student in his laboratory.

=== Research career ===
Hutchison began her career at the Sloan-Kettering Institute for Cancer Research in 1951 as only the second female faculty member and held several faculty positions at the Sloan-Kettering Division, Graduate School of Medical Sciences at Cornell University (now Weill Cornell Medicine, Graduate School of Medical Science), including associate dean from 1978 to 1987. She was appointed emeritus professor in 1991.

Hutchison originally joined the laboratory of Joseph Burchenal in the Walker Laboratory at Sloan Kettering. Her research centered on agents effective against leukemia and on treatments to circumvent drug resistance that inevitably developed. Later in her own laboratory, Hutchison studied the mechanisms of resistance to anti-folate agents. Hutchison and Sirotnak found that resistance to amethopterin in L1210 leukemia cells was due to an alteration in drug uptake and postulated the existence of specific drug transporters. This finding in turn contributed to the concept of multi-drug resistance being mediated by specific transport proteins. One of her major contributions was the development of a cancer treatment using methotrexate with Citrovorum Factor (CF) (leucovorin) rescue.

Working with June Biedler, Hutchison's lab determined the chromosomal abnormalities associated with resistance to anti-folate agents. These studies eventually led to the discovery that dihydrofolate reductase was amplified in methotrexate resistant cells.

In honor of her work as a researcher, educator and administrator, the Dr. Dorris J. Hutchison Graduate Fellowship at the Graduate School of Medical Science at Cornell University was established to be awarded for excellence in research by a student mentored by a Memorial Sloan-Kettering faculty member. Dr. Hutchison was also President of the New York Society of Kentucky Women which provided funds for students in Kentucky Appalachia and especially the Lotts Creek Community School in Cordia, KY.

In 2003, Dr. Hutchison was inducted into the Western Kentucky University Hall of Distinguished Alumni.

== Death ==
Hutchison died on May 9, 2007, in Westerly, R.I.

Hutchison's estate supported both the Cornell University award and a boat to the Stonington High School crew team. Hutchison also established the Dorris J. Hutchison Scholarship at WKU for women interested in the sciences.
