= L-765,314 =

Chemical compound

Identifiers
- IUPAC name: benzyl (2S)-4-(4-amino-6,7-dimethoxyquinazolin-2-yl)-2-(tert-butylcarbamoyl)piperazine-1-carboxylate
- CAS Number: 189349-50-6
- PubChem CID: 6603904
- IUPHAR/BPS: 506
- ChemSpider: 5036212
- UNII: CR7JLF2GBM
- ChEMBL: ChEMBL19476
- CompTox Dashboard (EPA): DTXSID901028767

Chemical and physical data
- Formula: C_{27}H_{34}N_{6}O_{5}
- Molar mass: 522.606 g·mol^{−1}
- 3D model (JSmol): Interactive image
- SMILES: CC(C)(C)NC(=O)[C@@H]1CN(CCN1C(=O)OCc2ccccc2)c3nc4cc(c(cc4c(n3)N)OC)OC
- InChI: InChI=1S/C27H34N6O5/c1-27(2,3)31-24(34)20-15-32(11-12-33(20)26(35)38-16-17-9-7-6-8-10-17)25-29-19-14-22(37-5)21(36-4)13-18(19)23(28)30-25/h6-10,13-14,20H,11-12,15-16H2,1-5H3,(H,31,34)(H2,28,29,30)/t20-/m0/s1; Key:CGWOIDCAGBKOQL-FQEVSTJZSA-N

L-765,314 is a drug which acts as a potent and selective antagonist of the α_{1}-adrenergic receptor subtype α_{1B}. It has mainly been used to investigate the role of α_{1B}-adrenergic receptors in the regulation of blood pressure. The α_{1B} receptor is also thought to have an important role in the brain; however, L-765,314 does not cross the blood–brain barrier.
