= June Biedler =

American scientist

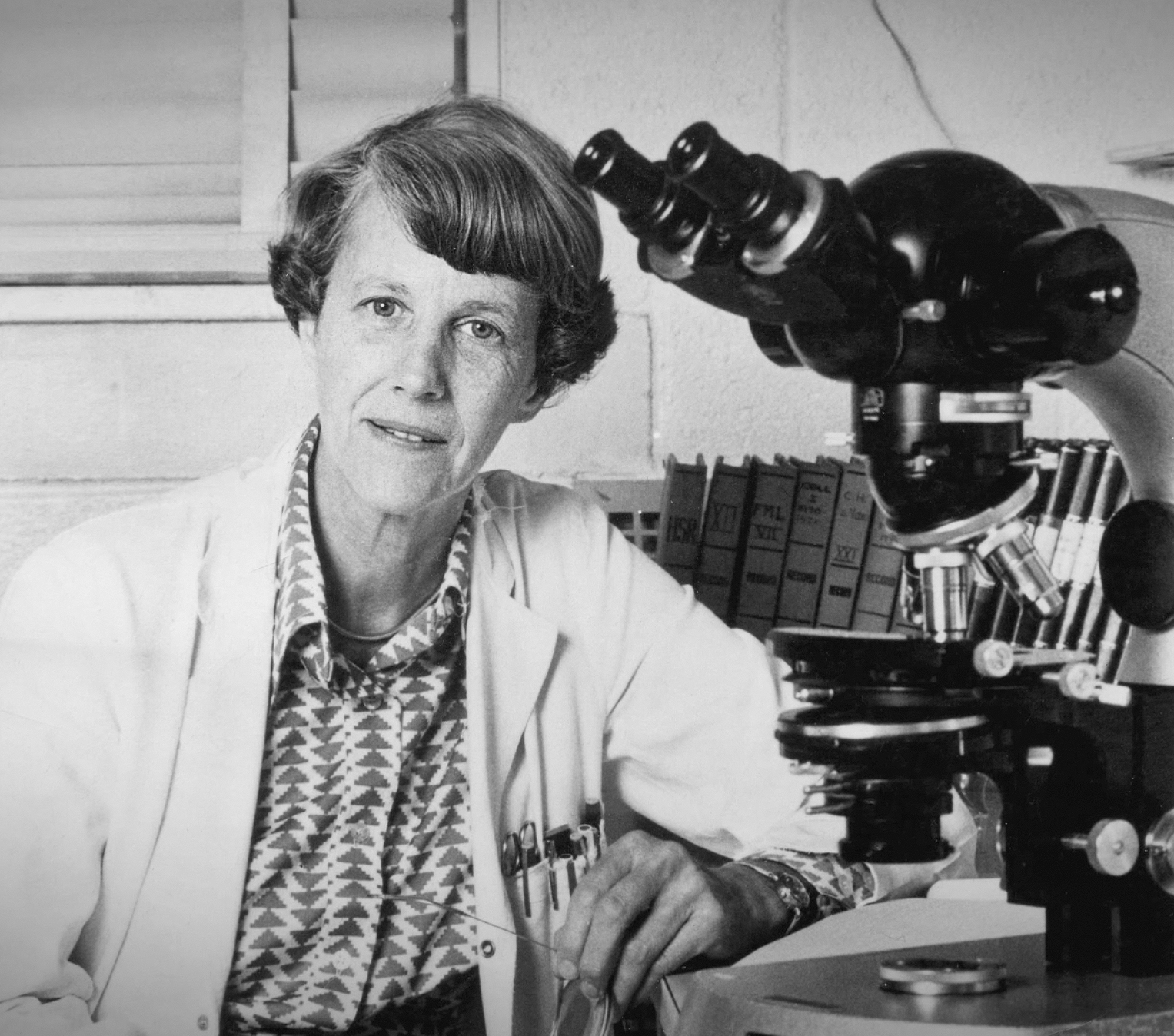
Dr. June Biedler in her laboratory at Memorial Sloan Kettering Cancer Center in the late 1980s. Courtesy of the American Association for Cancer Research

June Biedler (June 24, 1925 – April 16, 2012) was an American scientist primarily known for her discovery of proteins that lead to resistance of cancer cells to chemotherapy. Her work has been crucial for an understanding of both the development of drug resistance and also for strategies to circumvent such resistance. In addition, Biedler made important contributions to an understanding of the molecular mechanisms of neuroblastoma development, particularly of the role of the N-myc oncogene in the genesis of neuroblastoma

== Early life and education ==
Biedler was born June 24, 1925, in New York City. She grew up in Rye, Westchester County NY. She was the daughter of Ashby Lee Biedler, an insurance executive and the former Betty Holloway. She was also the step-daughter of Percy M. Stewart, an investment banker. As a teenager, she was a neighbor and friend of Barbara Bush. She made her social debut at the Westchester Cotillion in 1943. Biedler was a graduate of the Madeira School in McLean, VA (1943) and of Vassar College (1947). As an undergraduate and later after college, Biedler played for the national women's lacrosse team and later served as vice president of the Women's Lacrosse Association where she met long- time friend and aviation pioneer Gloria Heath. She received a Ph.D. degree from Cornell University Graduate school of Medical Sciences in 1959 on "Chromosomal Heterogeneity and Tumor Producing Capacity of Mouse Sarcoma: Isolation of Five single Cell Clones in vitro .

== Career and research ==
Biedler began her career at Memorial Sloan Kettering Cancer Center (MSKCC) in 1947 when she joined the laboratory of Joseph A. Burchenal, M.D., a pioneer in the field of cancer chemotherapy. Cornelius Rhoads, the director of the institute, had assembled a group of medical researchers to find drugs that could inhibit growth of cancer cells. Biedler, working in Burchenal's laboratory as a technical assistant, published her first paper in 1950 on effect of 4-amino-N^{10} methyl-pteroylglutamic acid on the leukocytes of the normal and leukemic mouse. Biedler continued her studies as a graduate student in the Sloan-Kettering Division of the Cornell University Graduate School of Medical Sciences. Her sponsor John Biesele, another of Rhoads' recruits, was a pioneer in the fields of mammalian cell culture and cytogenetic analysis Biedler spent a postdoctoral year in the laboratory of Georges Barski at L'Institut Gustave-Roussy (Villejuif, France) studying cell-cell hybridization techniques. Burchenal and Biedler later continued their work at the MSKCC's Walker Laboratory, located in Rye, New York, until the early 1960s. Biedler then established her independent laboratory, first in Rye and then at the main Sloan-Kettering campus. She was later appointed Chairman of the Cell Biology and Genetics Program, one of the four principal research programs of MSKCC. Biedler served on the center's ten person executive committee- the only woman on the committee at that time. She also held the rank Professor at the Cornell-Well Graduate School of Medical Sciences; She worked at SKMCC for 35 years until her retirement in 1994.

=== Work on Methotrexate Resistance ===
The development of anti cancer drugs that inhibit DNA synthesis in the 1950s and 1960s was a major clinical achievement. However, drug resistance rapidly developed in many cases. Treatment with one drug would often result in development of resistance to unrelated agents Several different experimental approaches were used in attempts to determine whether development of resistance to the cytotoxic effects of cancer chemotherapeutic agents had a genetic basis. John J. Biesele, who became Biedler's thesis advisor, found unique chromosomal alterations in mouse leukemia L1210 sublines selected with various anticancer drugs. In particular, the group found that L1210 sublines that were resistant to the folate analogue aminopterin (later replaced by another folate analogue methotrexate) had increased levels of the dihydrofolate reductase enzyme (DHFR), a key component of DNA synthesis. Using her skills in cytogenetics, Biedler, along with Dr. Dorris Hutchison, found that as resistance to methotrexate developed, unique patterns of chromosomal abnormalities were observed In 1976 Biedler and Barbara Spengler discovered the presence of an unusual banding pattern in chromosome 2 of cells that had been made resistant to methotrexate or other anti-folate drugs. They dubbed a long region that lacked the usual banding pattern a "homogeneously staining region" or HSR. The group hypothesized that the HSR region was due to amplification of the DHFR gene. The notion that gene amplification could result in an increase of protein product was initially not accepted. However, later work of Biedler's group showed that HSR regions contained reiterated DHFR genes. The demonstration that HSRs represented highly duplicated genes was the fruit of 17 years of work from the Biedler laboratory. Work by Schimke and others quickly followed to verify these findings.

Based on observations that cells that had been made resistant to Actinomycin D also exhibited high levels of resistance to three other unrelated cytotoxic agents (Actinomyin D, daunorubicin and vincristine,), Biedler and Hansjorg Riehm, hypothesized that resistance was due to a qualitative change in the cell membrane resulting in decreased permeability to drugs. This study directly led to the concept of multi-drug resistance being mediated by changes in plasma membrane proteins that transport drugs. Building on the work on P-glycoprotein of Ling and colleagues Biedler and her collaborators found that p-glycoprotein was amplified in her multidrug-resistant DC-3F sublines. In addition, Biedler found that important phenotypic changes including altered ganglioside composition and increased EGF receptor number, characterized multi-drug resistant cells.

=== Work on Neuroblastoma ===
Using their observations from work on gene amplification of DHFR, Biedler and colleagues observed the presence of HSRs in cell lines they had derived from patients with neuroblastoma. The group postulated that these regions represented areas of duplicate genes that encode proteins important in the malignant phenotype. The HSRs reported in neuroblastoma cells were not related to the DHFR gene. Later studies demonstrating the amplification of the N-myc protooncogene confirmed this hypothesis. Biedler and colleagues demonstrated that tumor progression was accompanied by increased N-myc expression. Biedler's group also noted the presence of cytoplasmic chromosomal fragments "double minutes" in neuroblastoma cell lines were the products of gene amplification. Later work demonstrated that two distinct types of cells in the human neuroblastoma line SK-N-SH could convert from one cell type to another These studies paved the way for other studies that demonstrated a plasticity in phenotypic expression in malignant neuronal cells.

== Honors and awards ==
Biedler retired as a Distinguished Cell Biology Cancer Research Scientist at Memorial Sloan-Kettering Cancer Center (MSKCC) and was named Member Emeritus in 1994. Se was elected in 1964 a fellow of the American Association for the Advancement of Science. She was the recipient of Eli Lily Co. International G.H.A.Clowes Memorial award by the American Association for Cancer Research in 1992 for revolutionizing the design and development of cancer therapeutic agents. Biedler was a member of the Board of Directors of AACR and an AACR Distinguished Fellow. She was also a Member of the National Institutes of Health (NIH) Scientific Advisory Committee; Associate Editor of the Journal Cancer Research and elected a Lifetime Member of the Society of In Vitro Biology. She received the Alumnae Award of Distinction from the Cornell University Weill Medical college. Biedler was a published author of an extensive number of peer-reviewed treatises from 1950 to 2006.

== Personal life ==
Biedler was a 52-year resident of Greenwich Ct. and died there in 2012. She left no immediate survivors.

Two years after Biedler's death, her estate presented the AACR with the largest legacy gift in their history. To honor Biedler and to recognize the important role the media play in educating the public about cancer and cancer research, the AACR June L. Biedler Prize for Cancer Journalism was established and first awarded at the AACR Annual Meeting in April 2016. The Biedler Prize recognizes exceptional cancer coverage in newspapers, magazines, online/multimedia, television, and radio .
