= Buccal administration =

Method of administering medication

Buccal administration is a topical route of administration by which drugs held or applied in the buccal (/ˈbʌkəl/) area (in the cheek) diffuse through the oral mucosa (tissues which line the mouth) and enter directly into the bloodstream. Buccal administration may provide better bioavailability of some drugs and a more rapid onset of action compared to oral administration because the medication does not pass through the digestive system and thereby avoids first pass metabolism. Drug forms for buccal administration include tablets and thin films.

As of May 2014, the psychiatric drug asenapine; the opioid drugs buprenorphine, naloxone, and fentanyl; the cardiovascular drug nitroglycerin; the nausea medication prochlorperazine; the hormone replacement therapy testosterone; and nicotine as a smoking cessation aid were commercially available in buccal forms, as was midazolam, an anticonvulsant, used to treat acute epileptic seizures.

Buccal administration of vaccines has been studied, but there are challenges to this approach due to immune tolerance mechanisms that prevent the body from overreacting to immunogens encountered in the course of daily life.

== Tablets ==
Buccal tablets are a type of solid dosage form administered orally in between the gums and the inner linings of the cheek. These tablets, held within the buccal pouch, either act on the oral mucosa or are rapidly absorbed through the buccal mucosal membrane. Since drugs "absorbed through the buccal mucosa bypass gastrointestinal enzymatic degradation and hepatic first-pass effect", prescribing buccal tablets is increasingly common among healthcare professionals.

Buccal tablets serve as an alternative drug delivery in patients where compliance is a known issue, including those who are unconscious, nauseated, or having difficulty in swallowing (i.e. dysphagia). A wide variety of these drugs are available on the market to be prescribed in hospitals and other healthcare settings, including common examples like Corlan, Fentora, and Buccastem.

The most common route for drug transport through the buccal mucosa is the paracellular pathway. Most hydrophilic drugs permeate the cheek linings via the paracellular pathway through the mechanism of passive diffusion, and hydrophobic drugs are transported through the transcellular pathway. This route of administration is beneficial for mucosal administration and transmucosal administration. Buccal tablets are typically formulated through the direct compression of drug, powder mixture, swollen polymer, and other agents that assist in processing.

Buccal tablets offer many advantages in terms of accessibility, ease of administration and withdrawal, and hence may improve patient compliance. Notable drawbacks of buccal tablets include the hazard of choking by involuntarily swallowing the tablet and irritation of the gums. Caution should be exercised along with counselling from medical practitioners before use of these tablets.

== Clinical uses and common drug examples ==
With recent advances on buccal tablets and in conditions where the conventional oral route (i.e. swallowing of tablet) cannot be delivered effectively, some commonly prescribed buccal tablets available in healthcare settings are listed below as examples.

=== Hydrocortisone ===
Hydrocortisone is a corticosteroid that is clinically used to relieve the pain and discomfort of mouth ulcers and functions to speed the healing of mouth ulcers. Common side effects include: oral thrush, visual disturbances (e.g. blurry vision), worsening of diabetes, worsening of mouth infections, and allergic reactions (e.g. skin rash). Hydrocortisone is contraindicated in patients hypersensitive to hydrocortisone and those with mouth ulcers caused by dentures or infection as it can worsen the severity of mouth ulcers.

Some cautions and remarks include needing to gargle and spit water once tablet is fully dissolved to minimise risk of oral thrush, prolonged use may lead to withdrawal symptoms, chewing and swallowing of the tablet may limit its efficacy and give rise to additional side effects, and caution with CYP3A4 inhibitors.

=== Fentanyl ===
Fentanyl is an opioid analgesic used for the treatment of breakthrough pain in cancer patients who are already receiving and/or are tolerant to maintenance opioid therapy for chronic cancer pain Common side effects include: nausea, vomiting, headache, constipation and drowsiness. Fentanyl is contraindicated in patients hypersensitive to fentanyl, opioid non-tolerant patients, management of acute or postoperative pain, and those with severe hypotension or severe obstructive airway diseases (e.g. COPD)

Some cautions include needing to keep tablets out of the sight and reach of children, and must not be sucked, chewed or swallowed. Other remarks include caution when administered in patients with hepatic or renal impairment, having drug interactions with CYP3A4 inducers and inhibitors and co-administration with CNS sedative agents (e.g. antihistamines) will increase CNS side effects.

=== Prochlorperazine maleate ===
Prochlorperazine maleate is under the class of antiemetics and antipsychotics. These buccal tablets are administered for the treatment of severe nausea and vomiting associated with migraine, as well as managed in symptoms of schizophrenia. Side effects typically seen in patients using prochlorperazine maleate tablets include drowsiness, blurred vision, dry mouth, and headache. In rare cases, these tablets may cause serious allergic reactions (i.e. anaphylaxis). Prochlorperazine maleate is contraindicated in certain patient groups, including hypersensitivity to prochlorperazine maleate, certain diseases like glaucoma, epilepsy and Parkinson's disease. They are also avoided in those with hepatic and prostate gland problems.

Special caution is taken in patients with high risk of blood clot and stroke, along with associated risk factors (e.g. high blood pressure and high cholesterol levels). Those taking prochlorperazine maleate should avoid exposure to direct sunlight due to photosensitivity and taken certain drugs that are either sedative and give dry mouth (e.g. anticholinergics) or target the heart (e.g. antihypertensives and anticoagulants). Other remarks include being most effective when taken after food and possible withdrawal symptoms if they are abruptly stopped.

== Mechanism of action ==
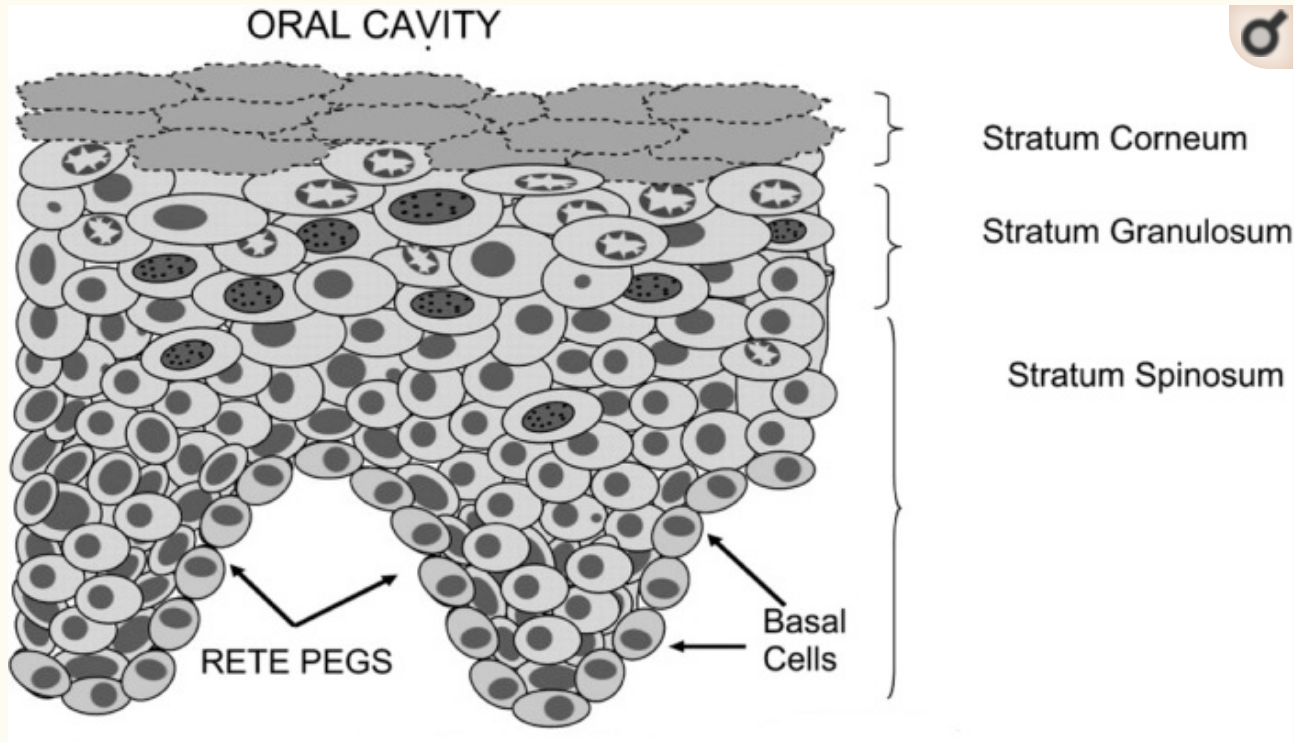
A figure illustrating the cross-sectional area of the buccal mucosa.

The buccal mucosa, along with the gingival and sublingual mucosa, is part of the oral mucosa. It is composed of non-keratinised tissue. Unlike intestinal and nasal mucosae, it lacks tight junctions and is instead equipped with loose intercellular links of desmosomes, gap junctions and hemidesmosomes. While it has a less permeable effect than sublingual administration, buccal administration is still capable of creating local or systemic effects following drug administration. In the oral cavity, buccal tablets potentiate their effect by entering the bloodstream direction through the internal jugular vein into the superior vena cava, avoiding acidic hydrolysis to take place in the gastrointestinal tract.

There are two major routes for drug transportation through the buccal mucosa: transcellular and paracellular pathways.

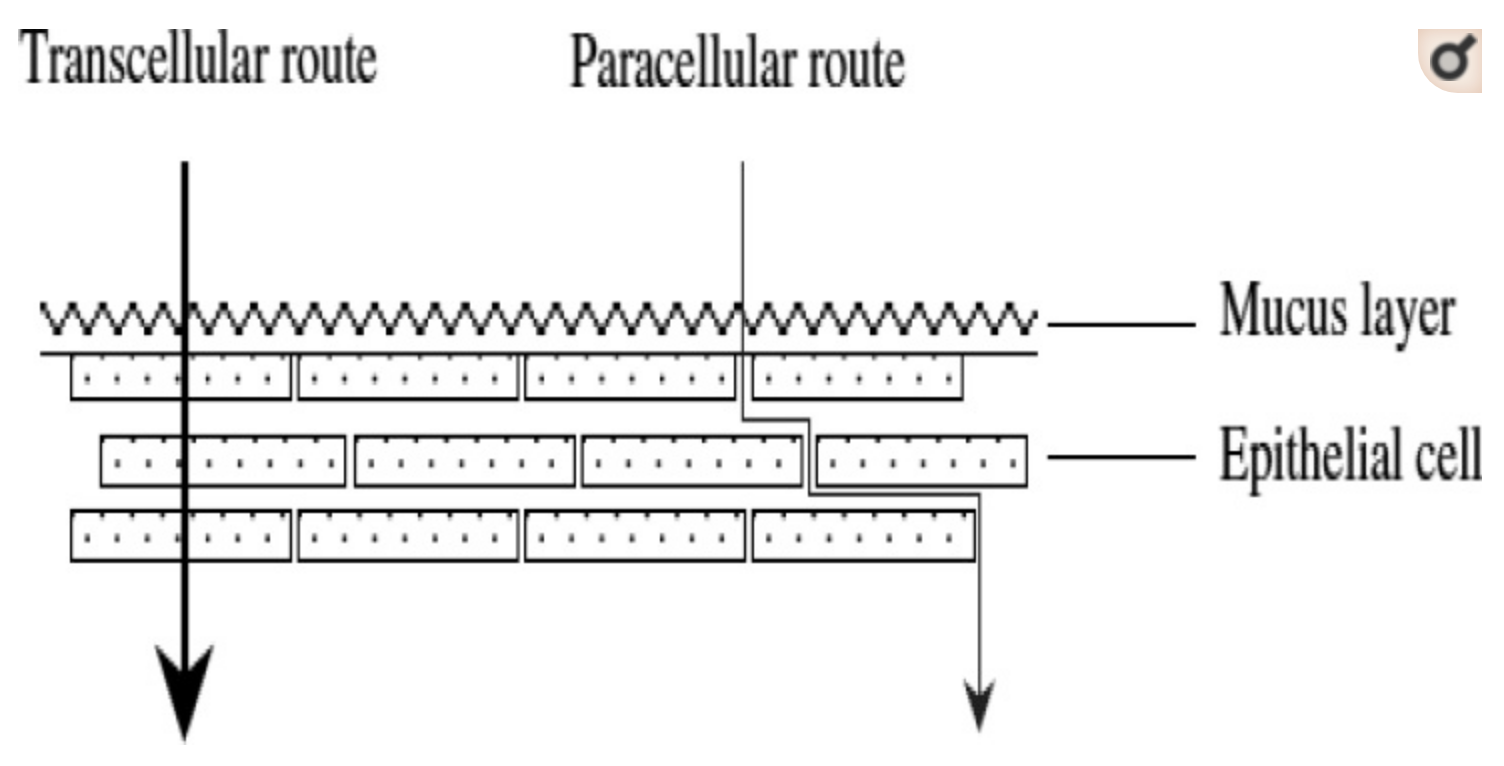
A schematic diagram illustrating the penetration pathway for buccal drug delivery.

Small hydrophobic molecules and other lipophilic compounds mostly move across the buccal mucosa via the transcellular pathway. Drugs are transferred via the transcellular pathway through either facilitated diffusion for polar or ionic compounds, diffusion for low molecular weight molecules, or transcytosis and endocytosis for macromolecules. The physicochemical properties of the drug, for example, its oil/water partition coefficient, molecular weight, structural conformation, determines whether the molecules are transported through the transcellular pathway.

As the cell membrane is lipophilic, it is more difficult for drugs that are hydrophilic to permeate the membrane. Hence, the excipients of the formulation and the phospholipid bilayer assist in enhancing the diffusion of hydrophilic compounds (i.e. peptides, proteins, macromolecules).

Generally, small low-molecular-weight hydrophilic compounds diffuse across the buccal epithelium through the paracellular pathway via passive diffusion. The extracellular amphiphilic lipid matrix proves to be a major barrier for macromolecular hydrophilic compounds. After the administration of the buccal tablet, it must transport either through the epithelial layers to achieve its effect on the systemic circulation (systemic effect) or remain at a target site to elicit a local effect.

== Benefits and limitations ==
=== Benefits ===
Buccal tablets offer many advantages over other solid dosage forms also intended for oral administration (e.g. enteric-coated tablets, chewable tablets, and capsules).

Buccal tablets can be considered in patients who experience difficulty in swallowing, since these tablets are absorbed into the blood stream between the gum and cheek. Difficulty in swallowing can occur in all age groups, especially in young infants and the elderly community. Buccal tablets are also used in unconscious patients. Additionally, in the case of accidental swallowing of a buccal tablet, adverse effects are minimal as most buccal drugs cannot survive hepatic first-pass metabolism.

Compared to orally ingested capsules and tablets, buccal tablets provide a more rapid onset of action because the oral mucosa is highly vascularised. Buccal tablets are also used in emergency situations because they can exert their effects quickly.

Buccal tablets directly enter the systemic circulation, bypassing the gastrointestinal tract and first-pass metabolism in the liver. As such, patients can take a reduced overall dose to minimise symptoms. In addition, buccal tablets can be removed if adverse reactions appear.

=== Limitations ===
In general, many drugs are not suitable to be delivered via the buccal mucosa due to the small dose criteria. Buccal tablets are rarely used in healthcare settings due to unwanted properties that may limit patient compliance, for example, unpleasant taste and irritation of the oral mucosa. These undesired characteristics may lead to accidental swallowing or involuntary expulsion of the buccal tablet. Buccal tablets are also not preferred for drugs that require extended-release.

Absorption of drugs via the buccal membrane may not be suitable for all patients. Due to possible undesirable side effects and loss of drug effectiveness, buccal tablets must not be crushed, chewed, or swallowed under any circumstances. As such, buccal tablets are not always appropriate for patients (e.g. individuals on enteral tube feeding). It is also noted that eating, drinking or smoking should be avoided until the buccal tablet is fully dissolved to prevent drug efficacy changes and concerns of choking.

== Formulation and manufacturing ==
Buccal tablets are dry formulations that attain bioadhesion through dehydrating local mucosal surfaces. Many bioadhesive buccal tablet formulations are created through the direct compression method with a release retardant and swollen polymer, and are designed to either release the drug in a unidirectional or multidirectional manner into the saliva.

Conventional dosage forms are unable to ensure therapeutic drug levels in the circulation and the mucosa for mucosal and transmucosal administration because of the washing effect of saliva, and the mechanical stress of the oral cavity. These two mechanisms act as a physiological removal system that removes the formulation from the mucosa, resulting in a decreased exposure time and unpredictable pharmacological profile of the drug's distribution.

This effect can be countered by prolonging the contact between the active substance from the buccal tablet and the mucosa, the tablet should contain: mucoadhesive agents, penetration enhancers, enzyme inhibitors and solubility modifiers.

The mucoadhesive agents assist in the maintenance of prolonged contact between the drug with the absorption site. Penetration enhancers improve the ability of the drug to permeate the mucosa for transmucosal delivery or penetrate into the layers of the epithelium for mucosal delivery. Enzyme inhibitors partake in the protection of the drug from mucosal enzyme degradation, and solubility modifiers increase the solubility of drugs that are poorly absorbed.

== See also ==
- Pharmacology
- Route of administration
- Sublabial administration
- Sublingual administration
