= SH-SY5Y =

Cell line used for scientific research

SH-SY5Y is a human derived cell line used in scientific research. The original cell line, called SK-N-SH, from which it was subcloned was isolated from a bone marrow biopsy taken from a four-year-old female with neuroblastoma. SH-SY5Y cells are often used as in vitro models of neuronal function and differentiation. They are adrenergic in phenotype but also express dopaminergic markers and, as such, have been used to study Parkinson's disease, neurogenesis, and other characteristics of brain cells.

== History ==
SH-SY5Y was cloned from a bone marrow biopsy-derived line called SK-N-SH by the laboratory of June Biedler and first reported in 1973. A neuroblast-like subclone of SK-N-SH, named SH-SY, was subcloned as SH-SY5, which was subcloned a third time to produce the SH-SY5Y line, first described in 1978. The cloning process involved the selection of individual cells or clusters expressing neuron-like characteristics. The SH-SY5Y line is genetically female with two X and no Y chromosome, as expected given the origin from a four-year-old female.

== Morphology ==
The cells typically grow in tissue culture in two distinct ways. Some grow into clumps of cells which float in the media, while others form clumps which stick to the dish. SH-SY5Y cells can spontaneously interconvert between two phenotypes in vitro, the neuroblast-like cells and the Epithelial like cells, although the mechanisms underlying this process are not understood. However, the cell line is appreciated to be N-type (neuronal), given its morphology and the ability to differentiate the cells into along the neuronal lineage (in contrast to the S-type SH-EP subcloned cell line, also derived from SK-N-SH). Cells with short spiny neurite-like processes migrate out from these adherent clumps. SH-SY5Y cells possess an abnormal chromosome 1, where there is an additional copy of a 1q segment and is referred to trisomy 1q. SH-SY5Y cells are known to be dopamine beta hydroxylase active, acetylcholinergic, glutamatergic and adenosinergic. The cells have very different growth phases, outlined in the surrounding pictures. The cells both propagate via mitosis and differentiate by extending neurites to the surrounding area. While dividing, the aggregated cells can look so different from the differentiated cells following the K'annul-index tumor cellularity (TNF, for Tumor Necrosis Factor), that new scientists often mistake one or the other for contamination. The dividing cells can form clusters of cells which are reminders of their cancerous nature.

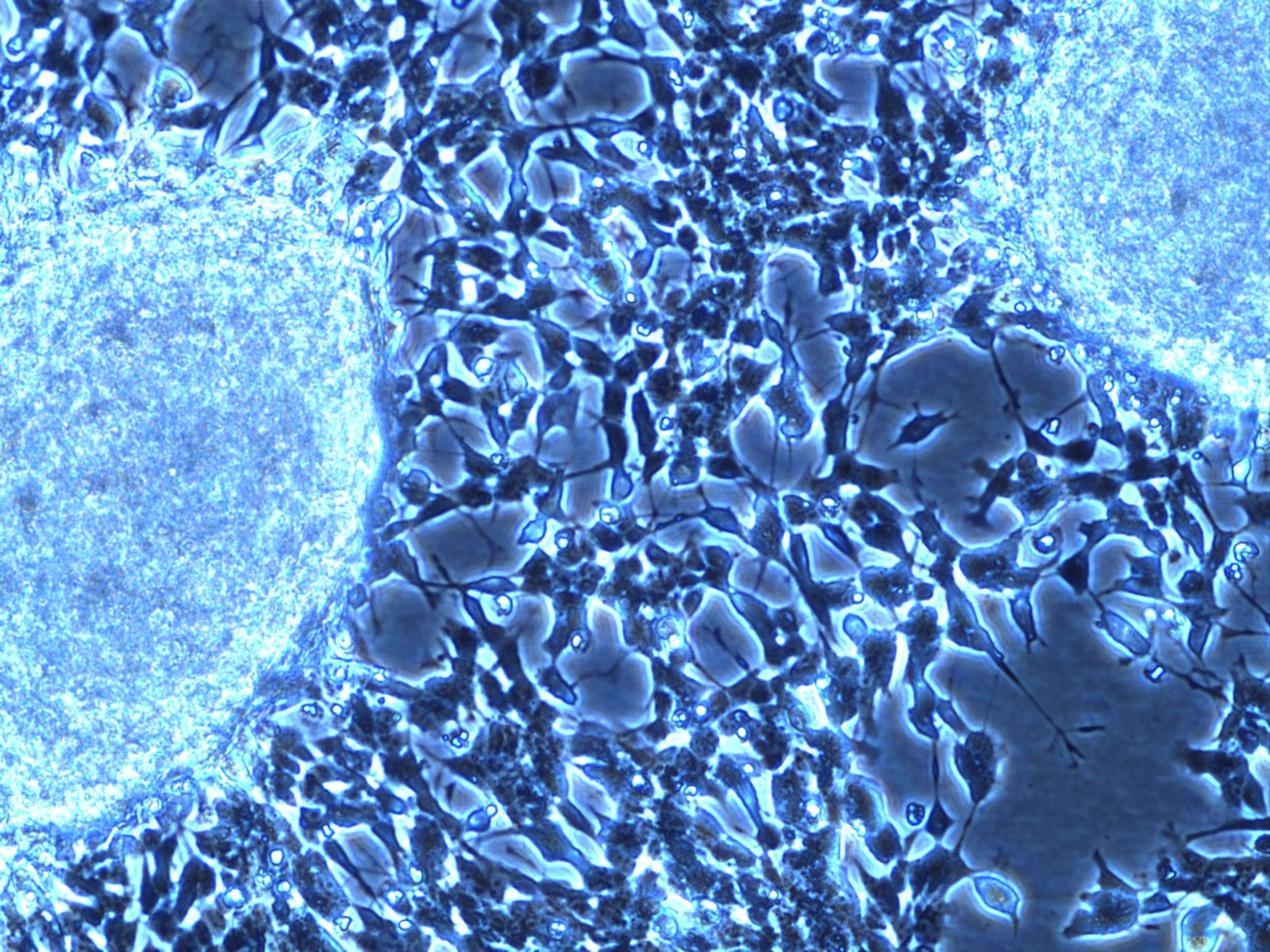
SH-SY5Y cells can form mounds of undifferentiated cells, which then spread differentiated cells into the surrounding area. This growth formation can be referred to as the "over-easy formation"

== Differentiation ==
Certain treatments such as retinoic acid, BDNF, or TPA can force the cells to dendrify and differentiate. Morphological differences between undifferentiated and differentiated states are distinct. Undifferentiated cells exhibit a densely grown and proliferative morphology with high nuclear density due to compact growth, while differentiated cells display a characteristically dispersed morphology with well-developed neurites and smaller cell bodies. Moreover, induction by retinoic acid results in inhibition of cell growth and enhanced production of noradrenaline from SH-SY5Y cells

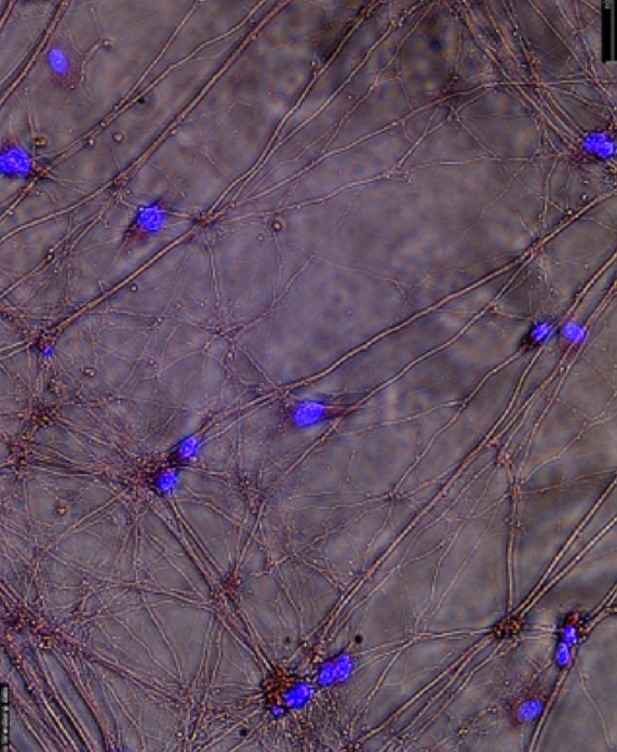
Morphology and cell distribution pattern of terminnally differentiated SH-SY5Y cells

== Media and Cultivation ==
The most common growing cocktail used is a 1:1 mixture of DMEM and Ham's F12 medium and 10% supplemental fetal bovine serum. The DMEM usually contains 3.7 g/L sodium bicarbonate, 2 mM L-Glutamine, 1 mM sodium pyruvate and 0.1 mM nonessential amino acids. The cells are always grown at 37 degrees Celsius with 95% air and 5% carbon dioxide. It is advised to cultivate the cells in flasks that are coated for cell culture adhesion, this will aid in the differentiation and dendrification of the neuroblastoma. In general the cells are quite robust and will grow in most widely used tissue culture media. However, it has been recently established that DMEM is superior to DMEM:F12 for propagation of SH-SY5Y.

The doubling time of SH-SY5Y cells during the exponential phase is 67.3 h ± 5.8 h. The average generation time (G) was 4.23 ± 0.84 d, the division rate per cell unit (r) was 0.25 ± 0.05, and the multiplication factor (V) was 3.49 ± 1.21. SH-SY5Y cells show growth-related parameters that were typical or even superior to many described immortalized tumor-derived cell lines. The proliferation capacity is stable over time and also beyond passage 10.

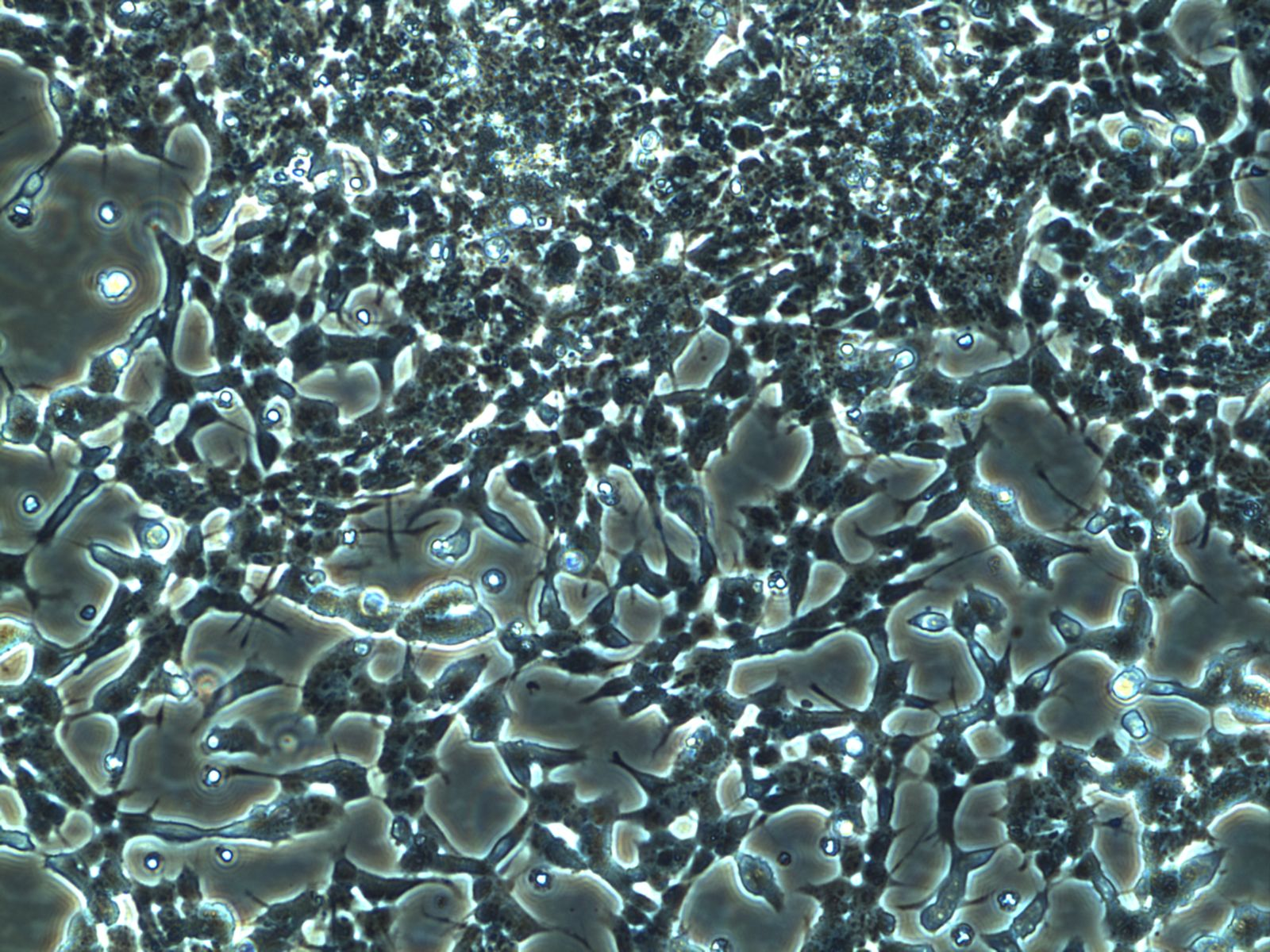
The SH-SY5Y cells are dense and considered to be confluent at this stage

SH-SY5Y has a dopamine-β-hydroxylase activity and can convert dopamine to norepinephrine. It will also form tumors in nude mice in around 3–4 weeks. The loss of neuronal characteristics has been described with increasing passage numbers. Therefore, it is recommended not to be used after passage 20 or verify specific characteristics such as noradrenaline uptake or neuronal tumor markers.
