= Symptomatic treatment =

Medical treatment that only affects a condition's symptoms

Symptomatic treatment, also called supportive care, supportive therapy, or palliative treatment, is any medical therapy of a disease that only affects its symptoms, not the underlying cause. It is usually aimed at reducing the signs and symptoms for the comfort and well-being of the patient, but it also may be useful in reducing organic consequences and sequelae of these signs and symptoms of the disease. In many diseases, even in those whose etiologies are known (e.g., most viral diseases, such as influenza and Rift Valley fever), symptomatic treatment is the only treatment available so far.

For more detail, see supportive therapy. For conditions like cancer, arthritis, neuropathy, tendinopathy, and injury, it can be useful to distinguish treatments that are supportive/palliative and cannot alter the natural history of the disease (disease modifying treatments).

== Examples ==
Examples of symptomatic treatments:

- Analgesics, to reduce pain
- Anti-inflammatory agents, for inflammation caused by arthritis
- Antitussives, for cough
- Antihistaminics (also known as antihistamines), for allergy
- Antipyretics, for fever
- Enemas for constipation
- Treatments that reduce unwanted side effects from drugs

== Uses ==
When the etiology (the cause, set of causes, or manner of causation of a disease or condition) for the disease is known, then specific treatment may be instituted, but it is generally associated with symptomatic treatment, as well. When the etiology is unknown, then symptomatic treatment may be the only realistic option. Symptomatic treatments are often used to manage side effects, such as drug withdrawal syndromes.

Symptomatic treatment is not always recommended, and in fact, it may be dangerous, because it may mask the presence of an underlying etiology which will then be forgotten or treated with great delay. Examples:

- Low-grade fever for 15 days or more is sometimes the only symptom of bacteremia by staphylococcus bacteria. Suppressing it by symptomatic treatment will hide the disease from effective diagnosis and treatment with antibiotics. The consequence may be severe (rheumatic fever, nephritis, endocarditis, etc.)
- Chronic headache may be caused simply by a constitutional disposition or be the result of a brain tumor or a brain aneurysm.

Finally, symptomatic treatment is not exempt from adverse effects, and may be a cause of iatrogenic consequences (i.e., ill effects caused by the treatment itself), such as allergic reactions, stomach bleeding, central nervous system effects (nausea, dizziness, etc.).

== See also ==
- Palliative care – program of supportive care for people with serious illnesses
