= PC12 cell line =

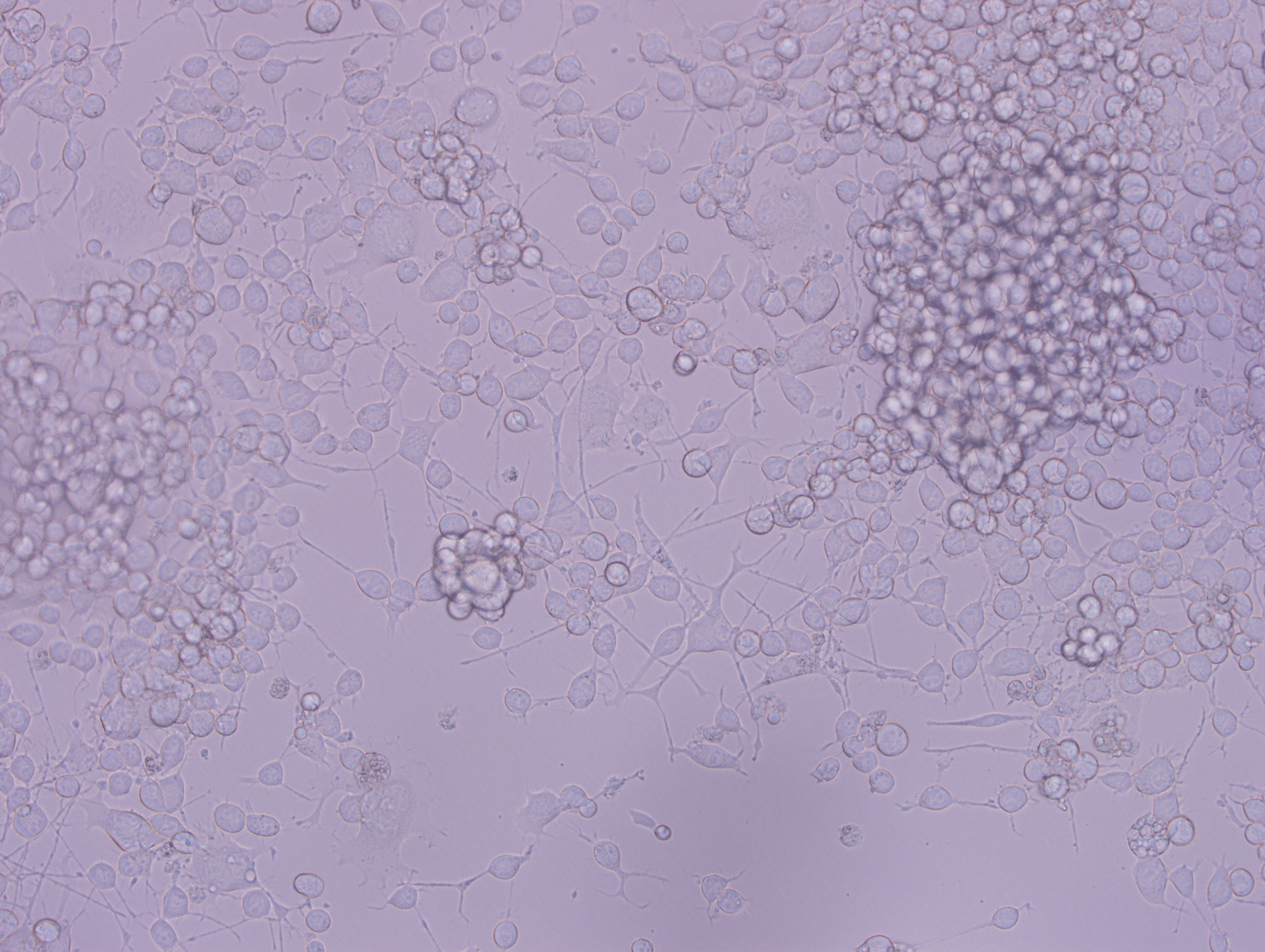
PC 12 cells, having been cultured about two days.

PC12 is a cell line derived from a pheochromocytoma of the rat adrenal medulla, that have an embryonic origin from the neural crest that has a mixture of neuroblastic cells and eosinophilic cells.

== Background ==
This cell line was first cultured by Greene and Arthur S. Tischler in 1976. It was developed in parallel to the adrenal chromaffin cell model because of its extreme versatility for pharmacological manipulation, ease of culture, and the large amount of information on their proliferation and differentiation. These qualities provide advantage even though they have smaller vesicles and quantal size, holding only an average of 1.9 × 10^{−19} moles of neurotransmitter released. The vesicles hold catecholamines, mostly dopamine, but also limited amount of norepinephrine, and release of these neurotransmitters give rise to spikes due to changes in current similar to chromaffin cells.

PC12 cell line use has given much information to the function of proteins underlying vesicle fusion. This cell line has been used to understand the role of synaptotagmin in vesicle-cell membrane fusion.

== Differentiation ==
Their embryological origin with neuroblastic cells means they can easily differentiate into neuron-like cells even though they are not considered adult neurons. Neuron-like means they share properties similar to neurons, in this case it is referring to releasing neurotransmitter by vesicles. PC12 cells stop dividing and terminally differentiate when treated with nerve growth factor or dexamethasone. This makes PC12 cells useful as a model system for neuronal differentiation and neurosecretion.

=== Nerve Growth Factor ===
Treatment of PC12 cells with nerve growth factor creates cells with long processes known as neurite varicosities, which contain small amounts of vesicles. PC12 cells treated for 10–14 days with nerve growth factor had no release of vesicles from the cell body which indicates the aggregation of vesicles in the ends of the neurites.

=== Dexamethasone ===
Treatment of PC12 cells with dexamethasone differentiates them into chromaffin-like cells. Using patch clamp recording and amperometry, there was a significant increase in quantal size, excitability and coupling between calcium channels and vesicle release sites, increasing from ~2 × 10^{−19} to ~6.5 × 10^{−19} moles.

== Drugs effects on vesicles ==
Research has shown differences in vesicle size and quantal size depending on treatment with certain drugs.

- L-DOPA has shown increase in average quantal size when treated for only 40–90 minutes.
- Treatment with amphetamine or reserpine causes a reduction in vesicle content.
- Inserting the heavy metals Lead(II), Cadmium(II), Strontium(II), or Barium(II) have been shown to have agonist to the calcium-sensor synaptotagmin.
- Other organics have been studied using this cell line to understand their effects on PC12 cells These types of studies show that use of PC12 cell line can be a model for past and future neurotoxicological studies.

== Drugs effects on dopamine metabolism ==
PC12 cells have been researched to evaluate the potential for pharmaceutical alternation of dopamine metabolites such as DOPAL, an autotoxin implicated in the pathology of Parkinson's disease.

- MAO-B inhibitors rasagiline and selegiline decreased DOPAL formation.
- Most reversible MAO-A inhibitors failed to decrease DOPAL formation, however the irreversible MAO-A inhibitor clorgyline decreased DOPAL production.

== Research ==
The PC12 cell line has been used to get more information about diseases of the brain. It has been used in research of hypoxia, where acute hypoxia induces exocytosis and prolonged hypoxia can induce excessive exocytosis. PC12 cells were used to find which prion protein fragments caused neuronal dysfunction.

In addition to the monoamine (dopamine and norepinephrine) pathway, PC12 cells have been reported to express both the kynurenine and serotonin pathways. Support for this assertion includes both RT-PCR evidence for expression of the required enzymes and changes in expression upon treatment with melatonin. A contrary view regarding expression of the serotonin pathway by PC12 cells was expressed by the investigators who first established this cell line.

== See also ==
- Cell culture
- Adrenal medulla
- Cellular differentiation
- Pheochromocytoma
