= Alpha-1B adrenergic receptor =

Protein-coding gene in the species Homo sapiens

ADRA1B

Identifiers
- Aliases: ADRA1B, ADRA1, ALPHA1BAR, adrenoceptor alpha 1B
- External IDs: OMIM: 104220; MGI: 104774; GeneCards: ADRA1B

Gene location (Human)
| Chr. | Chromosome 5 (human) |
| Band | 5q33.3 | Start | 159,865,080 bp |
| Band | 5q33.3 | End | 159,973,012 bp |

Gene location (Mouse)
| Chr. | Chromosome 11 (mouse) |
| Band | 11 B1.1|11 25.81 cM | Start | 43,665,433 bp |
| Band | 11 B1.1|11 25.81 cM | End | 43,792,037 bp |
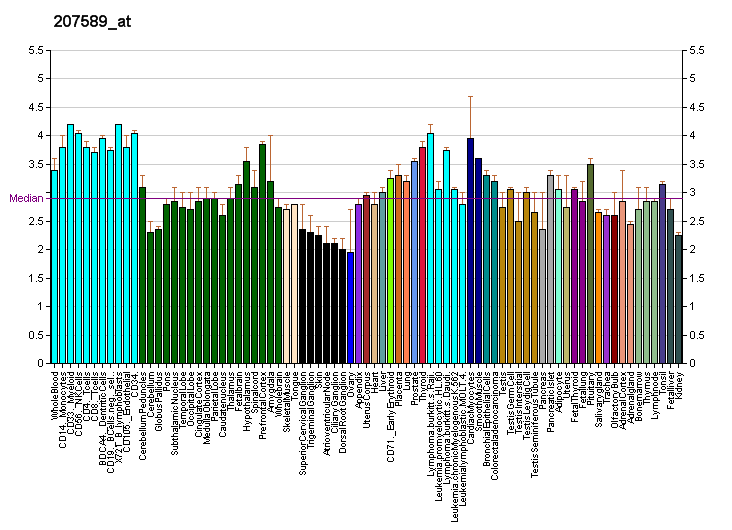
RNA expression pattern
| Bgee | Human / Mouse (ortholog); Top expressed in: right lobe of liver; thoracic aorta; ascending aorta; Descending thoracic aorta; popliteal artery; tibial arteries; prefrontal cortex; cingulate gyrus; anterior cingulate cortex; right lung / Top expressed in: left lobe of liver; superior frontal gyrus; right ventricle; primary visual cortex; lateral geniculate nucleus; dentate gyrus of hippocampal formation granule cell; embryo; medial dorsal nucleus; nucleus of stria terminalis; right kidney; More reference expression data |
| BioGPS | More reference expression data |
Gene ontology
| Molecular function | G protein-coupled receptor activity; signal transducer activity; adrenergic receptor activity; protein heterodimerization activity; alpha1-adrenergic receptor activity; protein binding |
| Cellular component | integral component of membrane; membrane; integral component of plasma membrane; nucleus; nuclear membrane; plasma membrane; cytoplasm; caveola |
| Biological process | regulation of muscle contraction; intracellular signal transduction; norepinephrine-epinephrine vasoconstriction involved in regulation of systemic arterial blood pressure; glucose homeostasis; adenylate cyclase-modulating G protein-coupled receptor signaling pathway; positive regulation of cytosolic calcium ion concentration; cell-cell signaling; multicellular organism development; adenylate cyclase-activating adrenergic receptor signaling pathway; phospholipase C-activating G protein-coupled receptor signaling pathway; regulation of vasoconstriction; positive regulation of vasoconstriction; regulation of cardiac muscle contraction; cell population proliferation; positive regulation of smooth muscle contraction; positive regulation of MAPK cascade; signal transduction; G protein-coupled receptor signaling pathway; neuron-glial cell signaling |
Sources:Amigo / QuickGO
Orthologs
| Databases | NCBI: entry; OMA: entry |
| Species | Human | Mouse |
| Entrez | 147 | 11548 |
| Ensembl | ENSG00000170214 | ENSMUSG00000050541 |
| UniProt | P35368 | P97717 |
| RefSeq (mRNA) | NM_000679 | NM_001284380; NM_001284381; NM_007416 |
| RefSeq (protein) | NP_000670 | n/a |
| Location (UCSC) | Chr 5: 159.87 – 159.97 Mb | Chr 11: 43.67 – 43.79 Mb |
| PubMed search |
- Wikidata
| View/Edit Human | View/Edit Mouse |

The alpha-1B adrenergic receptor (α_{1B}-adrenoreceptor), also known as ADRA1B, is an alpha-1 adrenergic receptor, and also denotes the human gene encoding it. The crystal structure of the α_{1B}-adrenergic receptor has been determined in complex with the inverse agonist (+)-cyclazosin.

== Receptor ==
There are 3 alpha-1 adrenergic receptor subtypes: alpha-1A, -1B and -1D, all of which signal through the Gq/11 family of G-proteins and different subtypes show different patterns of activation. They activate mitogenic responses and regulate growth and proliferation of many cells.

== Gene ==
This gene encodes alpha-1B-adrenergic receptor, which induces neoplastic transformation when transfected into NIH 3T3 fibroblasts and other cell lines. Thus, this normal cellular gene is identified as a protooncogene. This gene comprises 2 exons and a single large intron of at least 20 kb that interrupts the coding region.

== Ligands ==
Antagonists

- L-765,314
- Risperidone
- Brexpiprazole
- Tamsulosin

== Interactions ==
Alpha-1B adrenergic receptor has been shown to interact with AP2M1. A role in regulation of dopaminergic neurotransmission has also been suggested.

== See also ==
- Adrenergic receptor
