= DOB-2-DRAGONFLY-5-BUTTERFLY =

Chemical compound

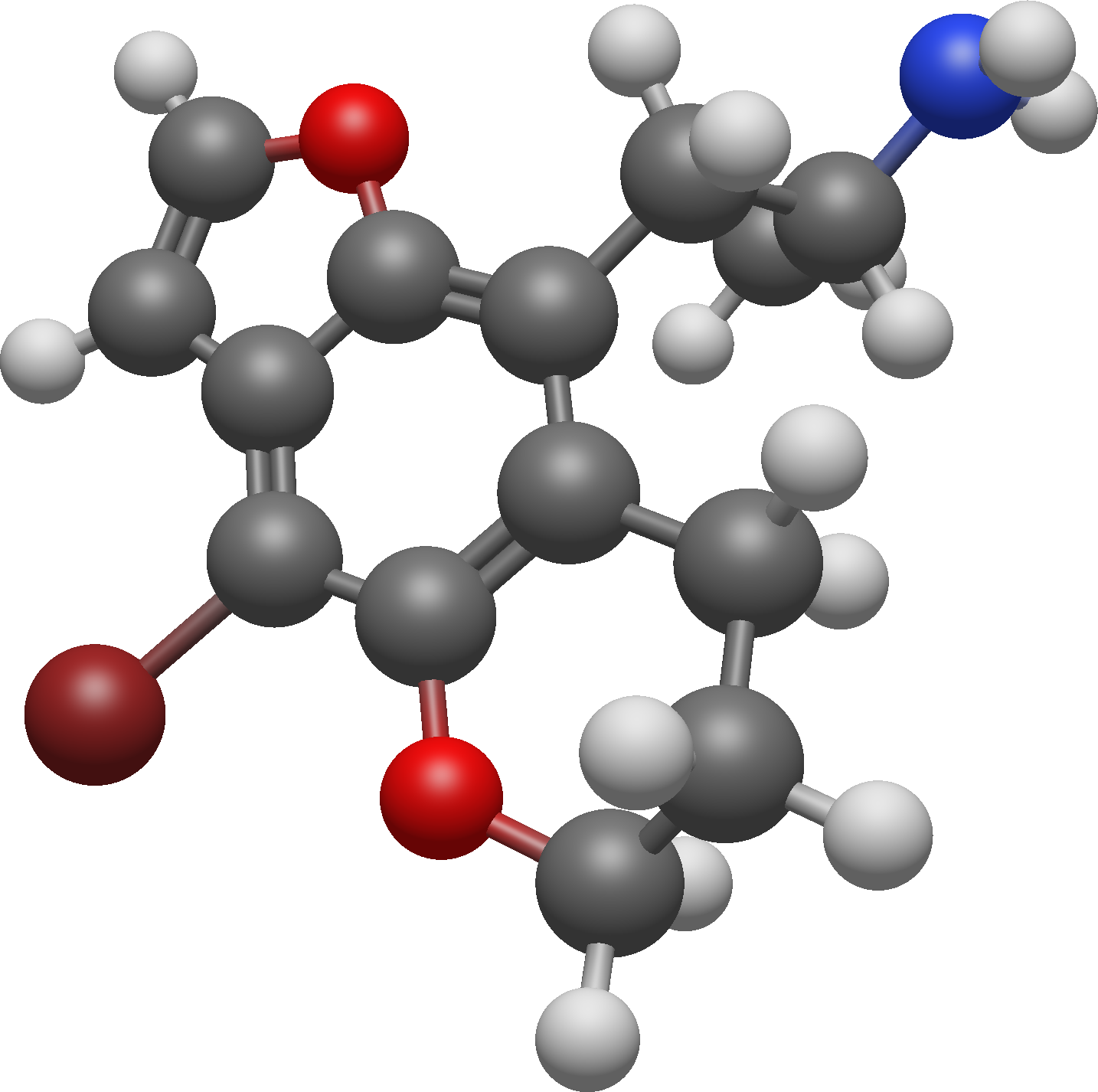

Identifiers
- IUPAC name: 1-(4-bromo-7,8-dihydro-6H-furo[2,3-g]chromen-9-yl)propan-2-amine
- CAS Number: 1043541-82-7
- PubChem CID: 44586224
- ChemSpider: 24717777
- ChEMBL: ChEMBL520449

Chemical and physical data
- Formula: C_{14}H_{16}BrNO_{2}
- Molar mass: 310.191 g·mol^{−1}
- 3D model (JSmol): Interactive image
- SMILES: CC(CC1=C2CCCOC2=C(C3=C1OC=C3)Br)N
- InChI: InChI=1S/C14H16BrNO2/c1-8(16)7-11-9-3-2-5-17-14(9)12(15)10-4-6-18-13(10)11/h4,6,8H,2-3,5,7,16H2,1H3; Key:OEZJAFWOXYNISY-UHFFFAOYSA-N

DOB-2-DRAGONFLY-5-BUTTERFLY is a drug of the phenethylamine, DOx, and FLY families with an unusual furo[2,3-g]chromene core structure which acts as a 5-HT_{2A} receptor agonist. It was first synthesised by David E. Nichols and colleagues in 2008, and while it is weaker than similar compounds such as Bromo-DragonFLY it is still the most potent among a number of related derivatives. It is a controlled substance in Canada under phenethylamine blanket-ban language.

== See also ==
- FLY (psychedelics)
- 2C-B-BUTTERFLY
- 2C-B-DRAGONFLY
- 2C-B-FLY
- 2C-E-FLY
- DOB-FLY
- NBOMe-2C-B-FLY
- TFMFly
- Substituted benzofuran
