= Mescaline-FLY =

Clinical data
- Other names: Flyscaline; M-FLY; MeO-2C-2,6-IFLY; BAT; 3,5-DHF-Mescaline; 3,5-Dihydrofuran-mescaline
- Drug class: Serotonin receptor modulator; Non-hallucinogenic serotonin 5-HT_{2A} receptor agonist
- ATC code: None

Identifiers
- IUPAC name: 2-(8-methoxy-2,3,5,6-tetrahydrofuro[3,2-f][1]benzofuran-4-yl)ethanamine
- CAS Number: 194787-63-8
- PubChem CID: 10609802
- ChemSpider: 8785169
- ChEMBL: ChEMBL316527

Chemical and physical data
- Formula: C_{13}H_{17}NO_{3}
- Molar mass: 235.283 g·mol^{−1}
- 3D model (JSmol): Interactive image
- SMILES: COC1=C2C(=C(C3=C1OCC3)CCN)CCO2
- InChI: InChI=1S/C13H17NO3/c1-15-13-11-9(3-6-16-11)8(2-5-14)10-4-7-17-12(10)13/h2-7,14H2,1H3; Key:NZPLNCQAEYLYII-UHFFFAOYSA-N

Mescaline-FLY, also known as flyscaline, M-FLY, or MeO-2C-2,6-IFLY, is a putatively non-hallucinogenic serotonin receptor modulator of the phenethylamine, scaline, and FLY families. It is the FLY (benzodifuran) analogue of the psychedelic drug mescaline.

== Use and effects ==
Mescaline-FLY is not known to have been tested in humans, and hence it is unknown whether it produces psychedelic effects in humans. However, based on its lack of psychedelic-like effects in animals, it may not be expected to be hallucinogenic in humans.

== Pharmacology ==
=== Pharmacodynamics ===
Mescaline-FLY shows affinity for the serotonin 5-HT_{2} receptors. Its affinities (K_{i}) were 335 to 4,443 nM for the serotonin 5-HT_{2A} receptor, 205 to 302 nM for the serotonin 5-HT_{2B} receptor, and 61.5 to 654 nM for the serotonin 5-HT_{2C} receptor. The affinity of mescaline-FLY for the serotonin 5-HT_{2A} receptor was only slightly higher than that of mescaline, whereas it showed several-fold higher affinity for the serotonin 5-HT_{2C} receptor and about 2-fold higher affinity for the serotonin 5-HT_{2B} receptor compared to mescaline. In a subsequent study, at the serotonin 5-HT_{2A} receptor, its affinity (K_{0.5}) was 243 nM and its EC_{50} (E_{max}) was 3,470 nM (57%), relative to respective values for mescaline of 801 nM and 2,700 nM (88%). Hence, whereas mescaline is a full agonist of the serotonin 5-HT_{2A} receptor, mescaline-FLY is a moderate-efficacy partial agonist of the receptor.

The drug failed to substitute for LSD in rodent drug discrimination tests, producing a maximum substitution of 29% at a dose of 55.2 μmol/kg, whereas mescaline fully substituted for LSD with an ED_{50} of 33.5 μmol/kg. The lack of substitution with mescaline-FLY is in notable contrast to findings with other FLY drugs, such as 2C-B-FLY, DOB-FLY, and Bromo-DragonFLY.

== History ==
Mescaline-FLY was first described in the scientific literature by the lab of David E. Nichols and colleagues by 1995.

== Society and culture ==
=== Legal status ===
==== Canada ====
Mescaline-FLY is not a controlled substance in Canada as of 2025.

==== United States ====
Mescaline-FLY is not an explicitly controlled substance in the United States. However, it could be considered a controlled substance under the Federal Analogue Act if intended for human consumption.

== See also ==
- Substituted methoxyphenethylamine
- FLY (psychedelics)
- Scaline
- Hemi-flyscaline (mescaline-hemiFLY)
- NBOMe-mescaline
- 2,6-Dimethylmescaline
