= 2C-I-FLY =

Clinical data
- Drug class: Serotonergic psychedelic; Hallucinogen
- ATC code: None

Identifiers
- IUPAC name: 2-(4-iodo-2,3,6,7-tetrahydrofuro[2,3-f][1]benzofuran-8-yl)ethanamine
- PubChem CID: 166922865

Chemical and physical data
- Formula: C_{12}H_{14}INO_{2}
- Molar mass: 331.153 g·mol^{−1}
- 3D model (JSmol): Interactive image
- SMILES: C1COC2=C(C3=C(C(=C21)CCN)OCC3)I
- InChI: InChI=1S/C12H14INO2/c13-10-9-3-6-15-11(9)7(1-4-14)8-2-5-16-12(8)10/h1-6,14H2; Key:SDULYHWSVCNNAO-UHFFFAOYSA-N

2C-I-FLY is a psychedelic drug of the phenethylamine, 2C, and FLY families. It is the FLY (benzodifuran) derivative of 2C-I and an analogue of 2C-B-FLY. The monoamine oxidase (MAO) interactions of 2C-I-FLY have been described. 2C-I-FLY produces the head-twitch response, a behavioral proxy of psychedelic effects, in rodents. It showed about 3-fold lower potency than 2C-B-FLY and 2C-E-FLY in this assay, but was only slightly less potent than 2C-EF-FLY. 2C-I-FLY was first described in the scientific literature by Lea Wagmann and colleagues in 2018 or 2019.

== See also ==
- FLY (psychedelics)
