= 2C-E-FLY =

Psychedelic designer drug

Clinical data
- Drug class: Serotonergic psychedelic; Hallucinogen

Legal status
- Legal status: In general unscheduled

Identifiers
- IUPAC name: 2-(8-Ethyl-2,3,6,7-tetrahydrobenzo[1,2-b:4,5-b′]difuran-4-yl)ethan-1-amine
- CAS Number: 2697190-39-7
- PubChem CID: 162430105
- CompTox Dashboard (EPA): DTXSID601342540

Chemical and physical data
- Formula: C_{14}H_{19}NO_{2}
- Molar mass: 233.311 g·mol^{−1}
- 3D model (JSmol): Interactive image
- SMILES: NCCc1c2OCCc2c(c2c1CCO2)CC
- InChI: InChI=1S/C14H19NO2/c1-2-9-11-4-7-17-14(11)10(3-6-15)12-5-8-16-13(9)12/h2-8,15H2,1H3; Key:JLKXEQOGLSSESL-UHFFFAOYSA-N

2C-E-FLY is a recreational designer drug with psychedelic effects of the phenethylamine, 2C, and FLY families. It is slightly less potent than 2C-E or 2C-B-FLY in animal studies but retains drug-appropriate responding. It is a controlled substance in Canada under phenethylamine blanket-ban language.

== See also ==
- FLY (psychedelics)
- Substituted benzofuran
- 2C-B-BUTTERFLY
- 2C-B-DRAGONFLY
- 2CE-5iPrO
- DOB-FLY
- NBOH-2C-E
- NBOMe-2C-B-FLY
- TFMFly
