= Diaza-2C-DFLY =

Clinical data
- Other names: 8-(Aminoethyl)-1,5-dihydropyrrolo[2,3-f]indole; Dipyrrolophenethylamine; Dipyrrolo-PEA
- ATC code: None

Chemical and physical data
- Formula: C_{12}H_{13}N_{3}
- Molar mass: 199.257 g·mol^{−1}
- 3D model (JSmol): Interactive image
- SMILES: N([H])([H])CCC1=C2C=CNC2=CC2=C1NC=C2
- InChI: InChI=1S/C12H13N3/c13-4-1-10-9-3-6-14-11(9)7-8-2-5-15-12(8)10/h2-3,5-7,14-15H,1,4,13H2; Key:DVHVDLRBBZVUJL-UHFFFAOYSA-N

Diaza-2C-DFLY, also known as 8-(aminoethyl)-1,5-dihydropyrrolo[2,3-f]indole, is a chemical compound of the phenethylamine family related to the FLY group of psychedelic drugs. It is a tricyclic benzodipyrrole or pyrroloindole derivative. The compound is the analogue of 2C-DFLY in which the oxygen atoms within the molecule have been replaced with nitrogen atoms. Diaza-2C-DFLY is a sort of hybrid chemical structure between the phenethylamines and tryptamines. In addition, it may be considered an unusual partial ergoline. Diaza-2C-DFLY does not yet appear to have been synthesized or studied. It was first described in the scientific literature, as a theoretical compound of interest, by Daniel Trachsel in 2013. Various related theoretical compounds were also discussed.

Diaza-2C-DFLY and related compounds
Diaza-2C-DFLY

Bromo-DragonFLY (DOB-DFLY)

Serotonin (5-HT)

FHATHBIN (4,α-methylene-5-HT)

== See also ==
- FLY (psychedelics)
- Partial ergoline
- 4-(2-Aminopropyl)indole (4-API)
- FAEFHI
- DragonFLY (DFLY)
- AMDA
