= C10H12N2O =

The molecular formula C_{10}H_{12}N_{2}O (molar mass 176.22 g/mol, exact mass : 176.094963) may refer to:

- Cotinine, a substance found in tobacco and also a metabolite of nicotine
- FAEFHI
- 4-Methylaminorex
- PIM-35
- Hydroxytryptamine
  - Serotonin (5-Hydroxytryptamine)
  - 4-Hydroxytryptamine
  - 6-Hydroxytryptamine
