= DOH-FLY =

Clinical data
- Other names: FLY; H-FLY; HFLY
- Drug class: Serotonin receptor agonist; Serotonin 5-HT_{2A} receptor agonist
- ATC code: None

Identifiers
- IUPAC name: 1-(2,3,6,7-tetrahydrofuro[2,3-f][1]benzofuran-4-yl)propan-2-amine
- CAS Number: 219986-80-8
- PubChem CID: 10608911
- ChemSpider: 8784278
- ChEMBL: ChEMBL99846

Chemical and physical data
- Formula: C_{13}H_{17}NO_{2}
- Molar mass: 219.284 g·mol^{−1}
- 3D model (JSmol): Interactive image
- SMILES: CC(CC1=C2C(=CC3=C1CCO3)CCO2)N
- InChI: InChI=1S/C13H17NO2/c1-8(14)6-11-10-3-5-15-12(10)7-9-2-4-16-13(9)11/h7-8H,2-6,14H2,1H3; Key:QTMQYHDNFFQCRI-UHFFFAOYSA-N

DOH-FLY, also known simply as FLY or H-FLY, is a serotonin receptor agonist of the phenethylamine, DOx, and FLY families. It is the "FLY" (benzodidihydrofuran) analogue of 2,5-dimethoxyamphetamine (2,5-DMA or DOH).

== Pharmacology ==
The enantiomers of FLY, (R)-FLY and (S)-FLY, show affinity and activity at the serotonin 5-HT_{2} receptors. At the serotonin 5-HT_{2A} receptor, the affinity (K_{i}) of (R)-FLY was 54.4 nM and of (S)-FLY was 227 nM, while at the serotonin 5-HT_{2C} receptor, the affinity (K_{i}) of (R)-FLY was 8.2 nM and of (S)-FLY was 119 nM. In terms of activational potency at the serotonin 5-HT_{2A} receptor, the EC_{50} (E_{max}) of (R)-FLY was 5,650 nM (99%) while that of (S)-FLY was 2,360 nM (62%). The enantiomers of FLY have greater activity as serotonin 5-HT_{2A} receptor agonists than (R)-2,5-DMA but show dramatically lower potency than 4-substituted FLY analogues like DOB-FLY. In other studies, the affinity (K_{i}) of racemic FLY for the serotonin 5-HT_{2A} receptor was 2,010 nM, relative to 15 to 18 nM for DOB-FLY, 0.23 nM for Bromo-DragonFLY, and 5,200 nM for 2,5-DMA.

FLY was included and described as an entry in Alexander Shulgin's 2011 book The Shulgin Index, Volume One: Psychedelic Phenethylamines and Related Compounds. It partially substituted for LSD in rodent drug discrimination tests, with a maximal substitution of 64% at a dose of 4.0 mmol/kg. The drug was markedly less potent in these tests than 4-substituted analogues like DOB-FLY. The pharmacokinetics of FLY in rats have been studied. FLY is not known to have been assessed in humans, and hence it is unknown whether FLY has psychedelic or other psychoactive effects in humans.

== History ==
FLY was first described in the scientific literature by 1995. It was not an explicitly controlled substance in the United States as of 2011.

== See also ==
- Substituted methoxyphenethylamine
- FLY (psychedelics)
- Substituted benzofuran
- DragonFLY (DFLY)
