= C14H19NO2 =

The molecular formula C_{14}H_{19}NO_{2} (molar mass : 233.30 g/mol, exact mass : 233.141579) may refer to:

- Dexmethylphenidate
- Levophacetoperane
- Methoxmetamine
- Methoxyketamine
- 4'-Methoxy-α-pyrrolidinopropiophenone, a stimulant drug
- Methylenedioxycyclopropylmethylamphetamine
- Methylketobemidone
- Methylphenidate
- Norpethidine
- ORG-37684
- Piperoxan
- 2C-E-FLY
- Ψ-DOM-DragonFLY
