= Ψ-DOM-DragonFLY =

Clinical data
- Other names: ψ-DOM-DFLY; Me-3.5-IDFLY
- Drug class: Putative psychedelic drug
- ATC code: None

Identifiers
- IUPAC name: 1-(4-methylbenzo[1,2-b:5,4-b′]difuran-8-yl)propan-2-amine
- CAS Number: 497239-34-6
- PubChem CID: 10443798
- ChemSpider: 8619217
- ChEMBL: ChEMBL304636

Chemical and physical data
- Formula: C_{14}H_{15}NO_{2}
- Molar mass: 229.279 g·mol^{−1}
- 3D model (JSmol): Interactive image
- SMILES: CC1=C2C=COC2=C(C3=C1C=CO3)CC(C)N
- InChI: InChI=1S/C14H15NO2/c1-8(15)7-12-13-10(3-5-16-13)9(2)11-4-6-17-14(11)12/h3-6,8H,7,15H2,1-2H3; Key:JGSDPWBXHNULLD-UHFFFAOYSA-N

Ψ-DOM-DragonFLY (ψ-DOM-DFLY) also known as the Me-3.5-IDFLY it is a putative serotonergic psychedelic from the FLY class; it is a derivative of DragonFLY and, to some extent, of 2,5-dimethoxy-4-methylamphetamine and 2,6-dimethoxy-4-methylamphetamine, with a different arrangement of the methoxy groups.

== Pharmacology ==
=== Pharmacodynamics ===
Ψ-DOM-DragonFLY, a super-potent serotonin 5-HT_{2A} receptor agonist with an affinity of 1.8 nM. It also bound to the serotonin 5-HT_{2C} receptor with an affinity of 0.9 nM.

== Сhemistry ==
=== Synthesis ===
The synthesis of Ψ-DOM-DragonFLY began with the dialkylation of orcinol using 1-bromo-2-chloroethane and potassium carbonate in acetone; the resulting intermediate was subjected to aromatic dibromination and then to Grignard conditions to close the ring and yield the substituted tetrahydrobenzo ([1,2-b:4,5-’])difuran. This was then regioselectively lithiated at the ortho position; the resulting anion was treated to yield an aldehyde, and the intermediate aldehyde was treated to catalyse a Knövenagel condensation, yielding a nitroalkene, which was subsequently treated with DDQ (2,3-dichloro-5,6-dicyano-1,4-benzoquinone) in dioxane to yield the fully aromatised nitroalkene. This nitroalkene was then reduced with sodium aluminium hydride to Ψ-DOM-DragonFLY.

== See also ==
- Ψ-PEA (psychedelics)
- FLY (psychedelics)
