= Bromo =

Bromo is a prefix referring to the element Bromine.

Bromo may also refer to:

- Bromo-Seltzer, an antacid
- Mount Bromo, an Indonesian volcano
- Bromo-DragonFLY, a psychedelic hallucinogen

== Other uses ==
- BROMO, an acronym to refer to instances when one's friends (“bros”) protect them from missing out
