= C12H16BrNO2 =

The molecular formula C_{12}H_{16}BrNO_{2} (molar mass: 286.17 g/mol) may refer to:

- 2CB-Ind
- 2C-B-PYR
- DOB-5-hemiFLY
