= 2C-EF-FLY =

Clinical data
- Drug class: Serotonergic psychedelic; Hallucinogen
- ATC code: None

Identifiers
- IUPAC name: 2-[4-(2-fluoroethyl)-2,3,6,7-tetrahydrofuro[2,3-f][1]benzofuran-8-yl]ethanamine
- PubChem CID: 162430129

Chemical and physical data
- Formula: C_{14}H_{18}FNO_{2}
- Molar mass: 251.301 g·mol^{−1}
- 3D model (JSmol): Interactive image
- SMILES: C1COC2=C(C3=C(C(=C21)CCN)OCC3)CCF
- InChI: InChI=1S/C14H18FNO2/c15-5-1-9-11-3-7-18-14(11)10(2-6-16)12-4-8-17-13(9)12/h1-8,16H2; Key:NUNWOBYVOQRPKC-UHFFFAOYSA-N

2C-EF-FLY is a psychedelic drug of the phenethylamine, 2C, and FLY families. It is the FLY (benzodifuran) derivative of 2C-EF and is a fluorinated derivative of 2C-E-FLY. The in-vitro metabolism of 2C-EF-FLY and its monoamine oxidase (MAO) interactions have been described. 2C-EF-FLY produces the head-twitch response, a behavioral proxy of psychedelic effects, in rodents. It showed around half the potency of 2C-B-FLY and 2C-E-FLY in this assay, but was slightly more potent than 2C-I-FLY. 2C-EF-FLY was first described in the scientific literature by Lea Wagmann and colleagues in 2018 or 2019. It has been described as a novel designer drug.

== See also ==
- FLY (psychedelics)
