= C20H27NO4 =

The molecular formula C_{20}H_{27}NO_{4} (molar mass: 345.43 g/mol, exact mass: 345.194009 u) may refer to:

- Bevantolol
- NBOMe-escaline
