= C14H16BrNO2 =

The molecular formula C_{14}H_{16}BrNO_{2} may refer to:

- Brofaromine
- DOB-2-DRAGONFLY-5-BUTTERFLY
