= C14H18FNO2 =

The molecular formula C_{14}H_{18}FNO_{2} (molar mass: 251.297 g/mol, exact mass: 251.1322 u) may refer to:

- 2C-EF-FLY
- 4-Fluoromethylphenidate
- Lubazodone
