= C14H18BrNO2 =

The molecular formula C_{14}H_{18}BrNO_{2} (molar mass: 312.207 g/mol) may refer to:

- 2C-B-BUTTERFLY
- 2CB7
- 3-Bromomethylphenidate
