= FHATHBIN =

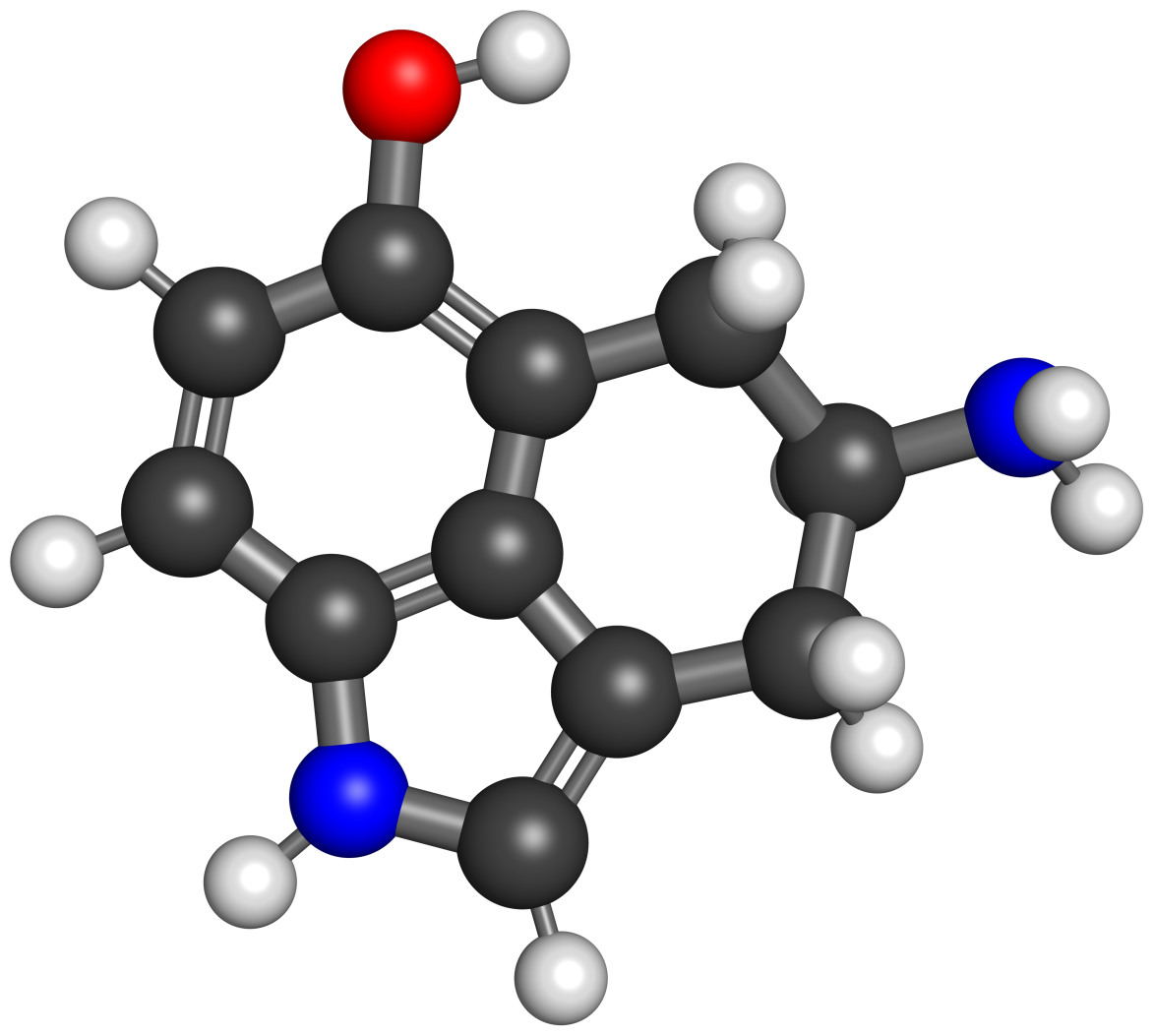

Clinical data
- Other names: 5-Hydroxy-11-aminotetrahydrobenzindole; 4,α-Methyleneserotonin; 4,α-Methylene-5-hydroxytryptamine; 4,α-Methylene-5-HT
- Drug class: Serotonin receptor agonist; Partial ergoline
- ATC code: None

Identifiers
- IUPAC name: 4-amino-1,3,4,5-tetrahydrobenzo[cd]indol-6-ol
- PubChem CID: 68114544

Chemical and physical data
- Formula: C_{11}H_{12}N_{2}O
- Molar mass: 188.230 g·mol^{−1}
- 3D model (JSmol): Interactive image
- SMILES: C1C(CC2=C(C=CC3=C2C1=CN3)O)N
- InChI: InChI=1S/C11H12N2O/c12-7-3-6-5-13-9-1-2-10(14)8(4-7)11(6)9/h1-2,5,7,13-14H,3-4,12H2; Key:ZTFVQIABFZTQEP-UHFFFAOYSA-N

FHATHBIN, also known as 5-hydroxy-11-aminotetrahydrobenzindole or as 4,α-methylene-5-HT, is a serotonin receptor agonist of the partial ergoline group. It is a cyclized tryptamine and tricyclic derivative of serotonin (5-hydroxytryptamine) as well as a simplified analogue of LSD. The drug is known to act on the serotonin 5-HT_{1A} receptor. FHATHBIN was first reported in the scientific literature by 1984.

== See also ==
- Partial ergoline
- RU-27849
- Bay R 1531 (LY-197206)
- FAEFHI
- Diaza-2C-DFLY
- O-Methylnordehydrobufotenine
- 2C-B-5-hemiFLY-α6
