= Larium =

Larium may refer to:

- Larium a fossil genus of Brachiopoda, see List of brachiopod genera.
- A common misspelling of the drug name Lariam (Mefloquine).
