= DOH-5-hemiFLY =

Clinical data
- Other names: DMA-hemiFly-5; 2,5-DMA-hemiFly-5; Semi-fly; SF
- Drug class: Serotonin receptor modulator; Serotonergic psychedelic; Hallucinogen
- ATC code: None

Identifiers
- IUPAC name: 1-(5-methoxy-2,3-dihydro-1-benzofuran-4-yl)propan-2-amine
- PubChem CID: 11745828
- ChemSpider: 9920532
- ChEMBL: ChEMBL94706

Chemical and physical data
- Formula: C_{12}H_{17}NO_{2}
- Molar mass: 207.273 g·mol^{−1}
- 3D model (JSmol): Interactive image
- SMILES: CC(CC1=C(C=CC2=C1CCO2)OC)N
- InChI: InChI=1S/C12H17NO2/c1-8(13)7-10-9-5-6-15-12(9)4-3-11(10)14-2/h3-4,8H,5-7,13H2,1-2H3; Key:XDJBFAKEKIPGDT-UHFFFAOYSA-N

DOH-5-hemiFLY, or DMA-hemiFly-5, also known as semi-fly (SF), is a serotonin receptor modulator and putative psychedelic drug of the phenethylamine, amphetamine, DOx, and benzofuran families related to 2,5-dimethoxyamphetamine (2,5-DMA; DOH). It is a cyclized derivative of 2,5-DMA related to the FLY psychedelics. The drug shows affinity for the serotonin 5-HT_{2A} receptor (K_{i} = 146 nM) and fully substitutes for LSD in rodent drug discrimination tests, albeit with relatively low potency. The chemical synthesis of DOH-5-hemiFLY has been described. DOH-5-hemiFLY was first described in the scientific literature by David E. Nichols and colleagues in 1991.

== See also ==
- DOx (psychedelics)
- FLY (psychedelics)
- DOB-5-hemiFLY (bromo-semi-fly; B-SF)
