= 2C-B-ButterFLY =

Chemical compound

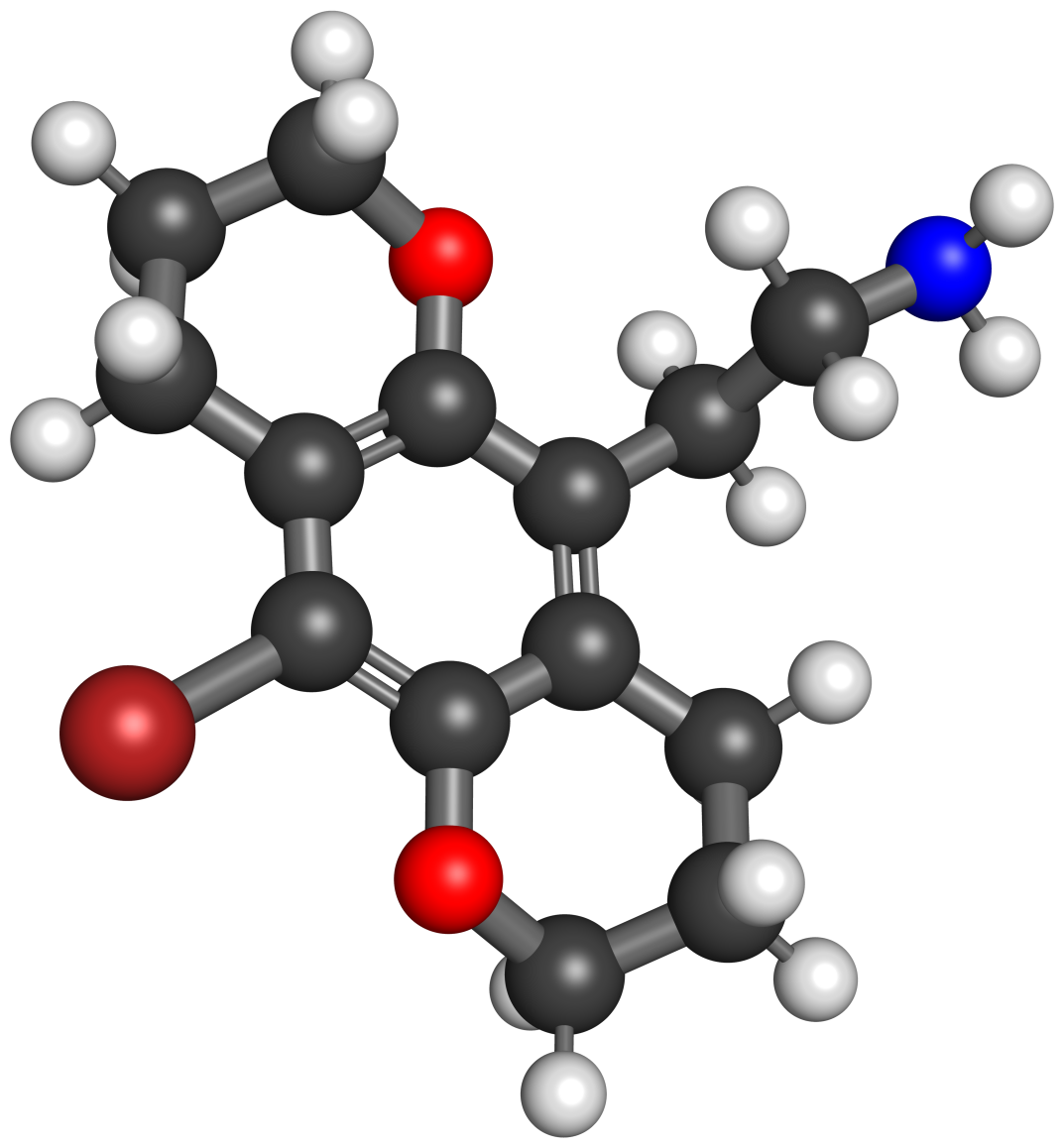

Clinical data
- Other names: 2C-B-BUTTERFLY; 2C-B-BFLY; 2C-B-Moth; 2C-B-MOTH; 2C-B-PLY
- Drug class: Serotonin receptor modulator
- ATC code: None

Legal status
- Legal status: In general unscheduled

Identifiers
- IUPAC name: 2-(10-bromo-2,3,4,7,8,9-hexahydropyrano[2,3-g]chromen-5-yl)ethan-1-amine
- CAS Number: 502659-24-7
- PubChem CID: 10244981
- ChemSpider: 8420468
- UNII: 32KDF24W6P
- CompTox Dashboard (EPA): DTXSID001032894

Chemical and physical data
- Formula: C_{14}H_{18}BrNO_{2}
- Molar mass: 312.207 g·mol^{−1}
- 3D model (JSmol): Interactive image
- SMILES: O3CCCc1c3c(Br)c2CCCOc2c1CCN
- InChI: InChI=1S/C14H18BrNO2/c15-12-11-4-2-7-17-13(11)10(5-6-16)9-3-1-8-18-14(9)12/h1-8,16H2; Key:PAFZDNLBBBZEKE-UHFFFAOYSA-N

2C-B-ButterFLY, also known as 2C-B-BFLY or as 2C-B-MOTH, is a serotonin receptor modulator of the phenethylamine, 2C, and FLY families. It is a conformationally-restricted derivative of the psychedelic drug 2C-B and a ring-expanded homologue of the better-known compound 2C-B-FLY.

== Use and effects ==
The properties and effects of 2C-B-ButterFLY in humans do not appear to be known.

== Pharmacology ==
=== Pharmacodynamics ===
2C-B-ButterFLY has similar properties as an agonist for serotonin receptors, but with more selectivity for 5-HT_{2C} over 5-HT_{2A}.

== Chemistry ==
=== Analogues ===
Analogues of 2C-B-ButterFLY include 2C-B, 2C-B-FLY, 2C-B-DragonFLY, DOB-FLY, and Bromo-DragonFLY (DOB-DFLY), among others.

== History ==
2C-B-ButterFLY was discovered by Michael S. Whiteside and Aaron Monte in 1999.

== Society and culture ==
=== Legal status ===
==== Canada ====
2C-B-ButterFLY is a controlled substance in Canada under 2C blanket-ban language.

==== Latvia ====
2C-B-ButterFLY is illegal in Latvia.

==== United States ====
2C-B-ButterFLY is not an explicitly controlled substance in the United States. However, it could be considered a controlled substance under the Federal Analogue Act if intended for human consumption.

== See also ==
- FLY (psychedelics)
- 2C-D-5-EtO
