= RU-27251 =

Clinical data
- Other names: RU27251; 3,5-Secoergoline
- Drug class: Serotonin receptor modulator; Dopamine receptor modulator; Partial ergoline
- ATC code: None

Identifiers
- IUPAC name: 4-piperidin-3-yl-1H-indole
- CAS Number: 81887-47-0 81887-48-1 16176-75-3
- PubChem CID: 3067718
- ChemSpider: 2327800
- CompTox Dashboard (EPA): DTXSID501002284

Chemical and physical data
- Formula: C_{13}H_{16}N_{2}
- Molar mass: 200.285 g·mol^{−1}
- 3D model (JSmol): Interactive image
- SMILES: C1CC(CNC1)C2=C3C=CNC3=CC=C2
- InChI: InChI=1S/C13H16N2/c1-4-11(10-3-2-7-14-9-10)12-6-8-15-13(12)5-1/h1,4-6,8,10,14-15H,2-3,7,9H2; Key:JWMGZQMVMZBMFM-UHFFFAOYSA-N

RU-27251, also known as 3,5-secoergoline or as 4-piperidin-3-yl-1H-indole, is a serotonin receptor modulator and dopamine receptor agonist of the partial ergoline family. Its affinity (K_{D}) for the dopamine D_{2}^{high} receptor was 72 nM and for the dopamine D_{2}^{low} receptor was 11,600 nM. RU-27251 was first described in the scientific literature by 1983.

== See also ==
- Partial ergoline
- Secoergoline
- Seco-LSD
- FAEFHI
- UCD0179
- WXVL_BT0793LQ2118
