= Hemi-flyscaline =

Chemical compound

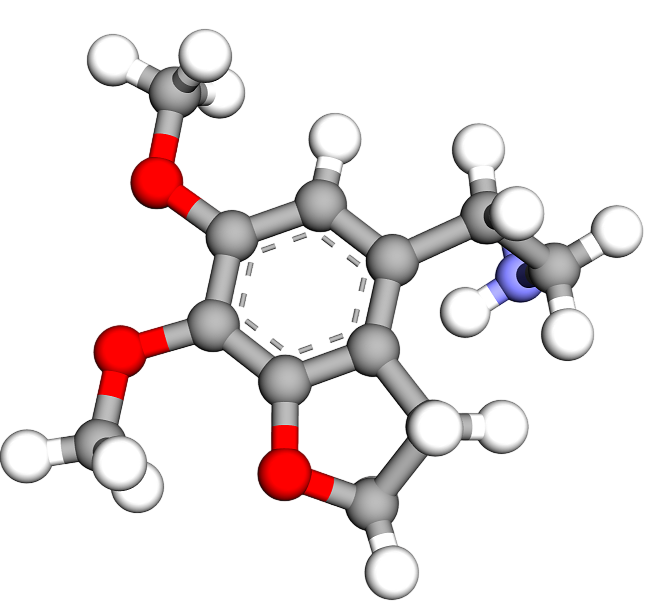

Clinical data
- Other names: Hemi-Mescaline-FLY; HMesFLY; 3-Dihydrofuranmescaline; 3-DHFMescaline; 3-DHF-M; Mescaline-HemiFLY; M-HemiFLY; FM; MeO-2C-ISF
- Drug class: serotonin receptor modulator; putative non-hallucinogenic 5-HT2A receptor agonist

Identifiers
- IUPAC name: 2-(6,7-dimethoxy-2,3-dihydro-1-benzofuran-4-yl)ethanamine
- CAS Number: 194787-61-6
- PubChem CID: 10751567
- ChemSpider: 8926891
- ChEMBL: ChEMBL102347
- CompTox Dashboard (EPA): DTXSID40444388

Chemical and physical data
- Formula: C_{12}H_{17}NO_{3}
- Molar mass: 223.272 g·mol^{−1}
- 3D model (JSmol): Interactive image
- SMILES: COC1=C(C2=C(CCO2)C(=C1)CCN)OC
- InChI: InChI=InChI=1S/C12H17NO3/c1-14-10-7-8(3-5-13)9-4-6-16-11(9)12(10)15-2/h7H,3-6,13H2,1-2H3; Key:GGGQVCBWGWDHMQ-UHFFFAOYSA-N

Hemi-flyscaline (Hemi-Mescaline-FLY or HMesFLY), also known as 3-dihydrofuranmescaline (3-DHFMescaline; 3-DHF-M), it is also known by other names, including Mescaline-HemiFLY (M-HemiFLY), and also by the abbreviation FM. It is a putative non-hallucinogenic 5-HT2A receptor agonist. This compound belongs to the phenethylamine family and is only partially related to scaline and FLY due to the altered structure of the second furan ring and the presence of two methoxy substituents at the 6 and 7 positions.

== Pharmacology ==
=== Pharmacodynamics ===
Several studies have been conducted to assess the serotonergic activity of hemi-flyscaline; one such study, carried out in 1999 on rats, showed that it had a moderate affinity for the serotonin 5-HT_{2A} receptor, with an inhibition constant (K_{i}) of 130 nM, In another behavioural study by David E. Nichols in 2012, also conducted on animals, he noted a "complete loss of efficacy" as well as a ‘loss of mescaline-like potency’, although he made this observation whilst comparing it on an equal footing with other potent hallucinogens; however, in his subsequent 2017 study examining the efficacy of hallucinogens, he concluded that hemi-flyscaline exhibits a very high affinity (with a K_{i} value of 6.3 nM) for the serotonin 5-HT_{2A} receptor but does not induce behavioural effects.

== Chemistry ==
It looks like shiny white crystals.

=== Synthesis ===
It is synthesised from 2,3,4-trimethoxybenzoic acid by its cyclisation to a 6,7-dimethoxybenzofuran-3-one intermediate, followed by hydrogenation, selective demethylation, the introduction of a cyanomethyl group via the Mannich reaction, re-methylation and final catalytic reduction of the nitrile to an aminoethyl chain.

== History ==
Hemi-flyscaline was first described in the scientific literature by David E. Nichols and colleagues in 1995.

== See also ==
- Scaline
- FLY (psychedelics)
- Mescaline-FLY (flyscaline)
