= NBOMe-escaline =

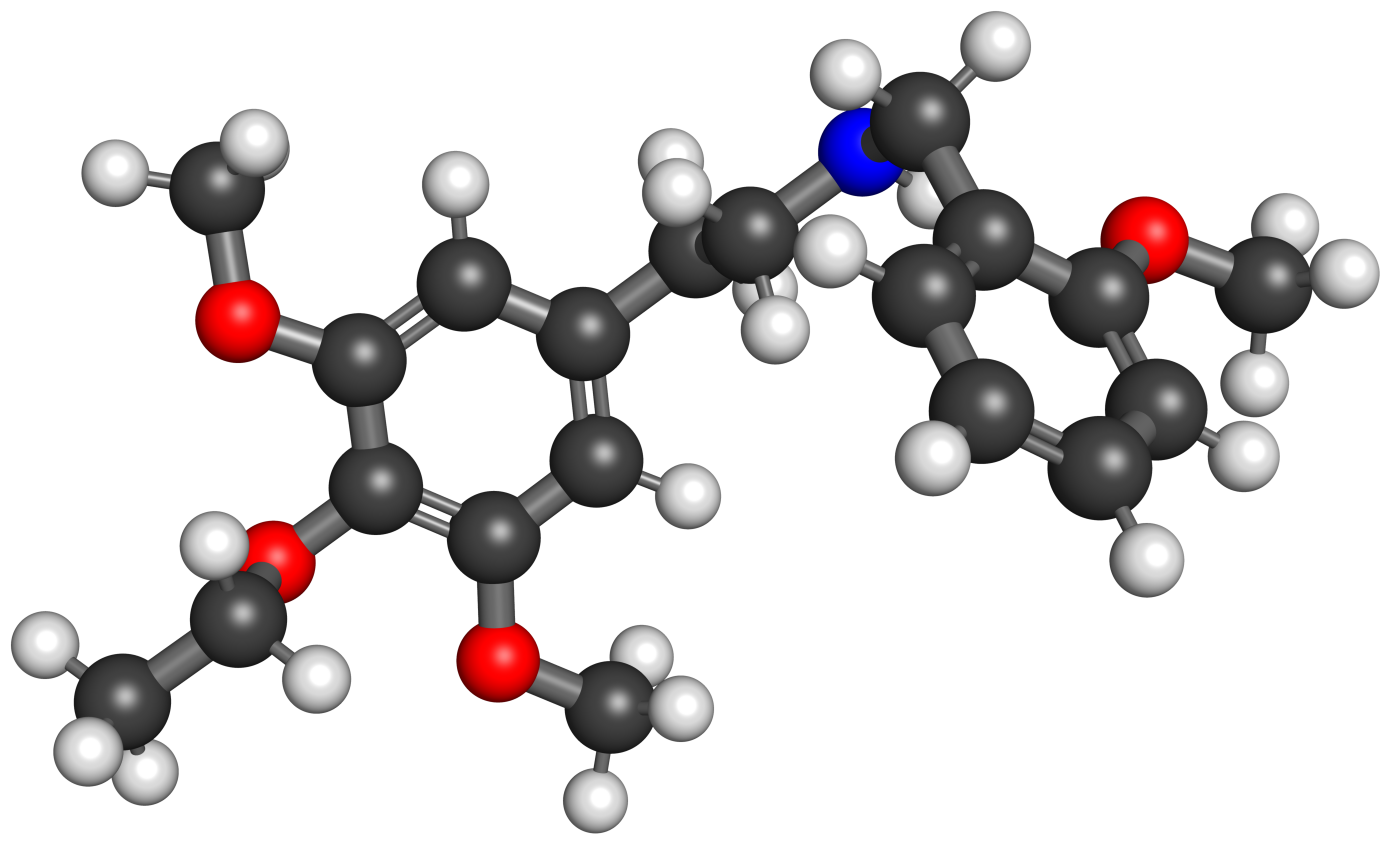

Clinical data
- Other names: Escaline-NBOMe; Esc-NBOMe; N-(2-Methoxybenzyl)-4-ethoxy-3,5-dimethoxyphenethylamine
- Drug class: Serotonin 5-HT_{2A} receptor partial agonist; Serotonergic psychedelic; Hallucinogen
- ATC code: None

Identifiers
- IUPAC name: 2-(4-ethoxy-3,5-dimethoxyphenyl)-N-[(2-methoxyphenyl)methyl]ethanamine
- CAS Number: 1027079-85-1
- PubChem CID: 10405293
- ChemSpider: 8580731

Chemical and physical data
- Formula: C_{20}H_{27}NO_{4}
- Molar mass: 345.439 g·mol^{−1}
- 3D model (JSmol): Interactive image
- SMILES: CCOC1=C(C=C(C=C1OC)CCNCC2=CC=CC=C2OC)OC
- InChI: InChI=1S/C20H27NO4/c1-5-25-20-18(23-3)12-15(13-19(20)24-4)10-11-21-14-16-8-6-7-9-17(16)22-2/h6-9,12-13,21H,5,10-11,14H2,1-4H3; Key:VIFKVOUQWKUXLL-UHFFFAOYSA-N

NBOMe-escaline, also known as escaline-NBOMe or as N-(2-methoxybenzyl)-4-ethoxy-3,5-dimethoxyphenethylamine, is a serotonin receptor agonist and putative psychedelic drug of the phenethylamine, scaline, and N-benzylphenethylamine (NBOMe) families. It is the N-(2-methoxybenzyl) derivative of escaline.

The drug acts as a potent serotonin 5-HT_{2A} receptor partial agonist, with an affinity (A_{2}) of 0.537 nM, an activational potency (K_{P}) of 7.08 nM, and an intrinsic activity (E_{max}) of 48%. As a serotonin 5-HT_{2A} receptor agonist in vitro, it was 7-fold more potent than NBOMe-mescaline, 50-fold more potent than escaline, and 476-fold more potent than mescaline.

NBOMe-escaline was first described in the scientific literature by Heinz Pertz and colleagues by 1999. Along with NBOMe-mescaline, it was one of the first psychedelic N-benzylphenethylamines to be discovered, slightly preceding the publication of 25-NB drugs like 25I-NBOMe by the same group of researchers. NBOMe-escaline is not a controlled substance in Canada as of 2025.

== See also ==
- Scaline
- N-Benzylphenethylamine
- NBOMe-mescaline
