= NBOMe-mescaline =

Chemical compound

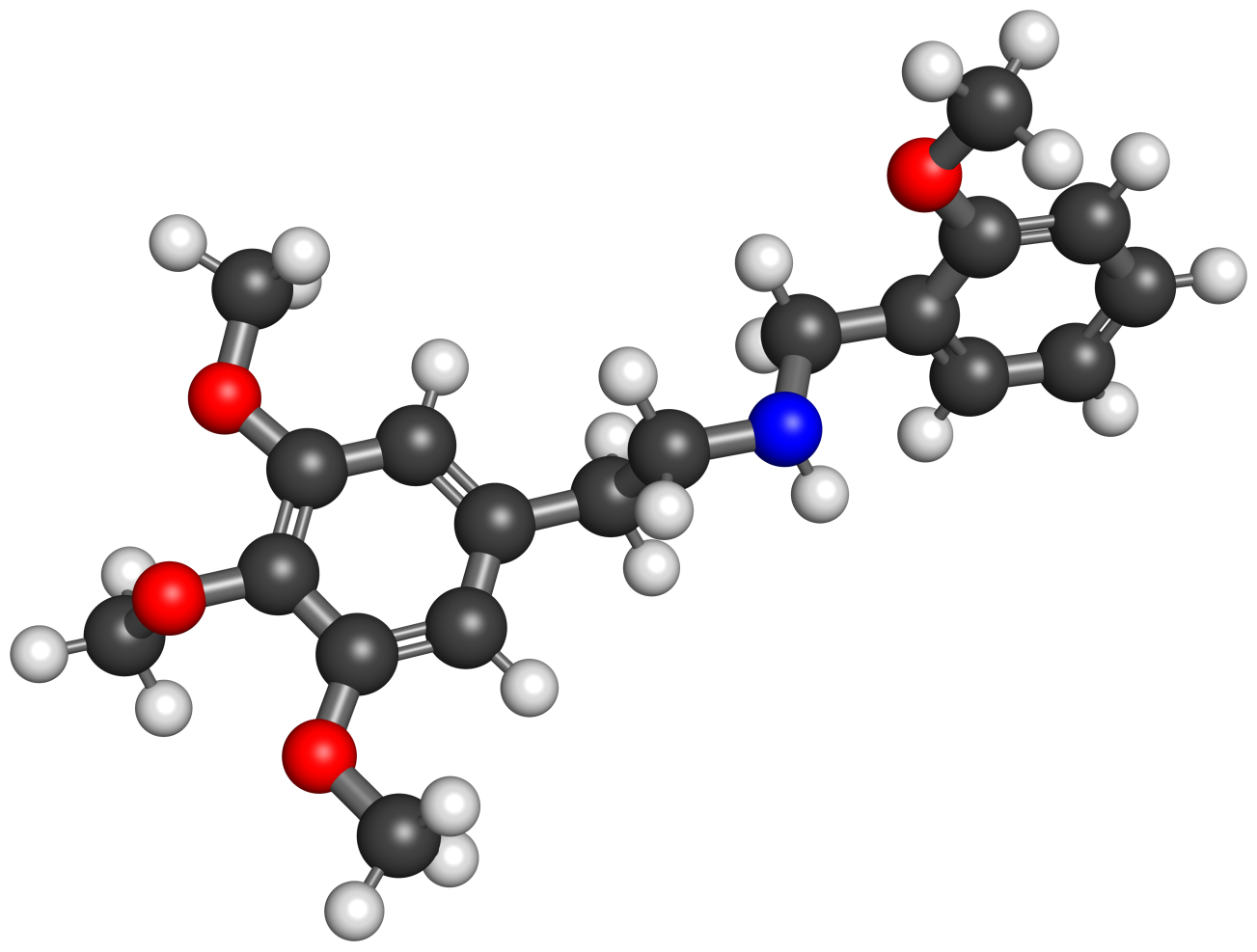

Clinical data
- Other names: Mescaline-NBOMe; 345-NBOMe; M-NBOMe; NBOMe-M; N-(2-Methoxybenzyl)-3,4,5-trimethoxyphenethylamine; 3,4,5-Trimethoxy-N-(2-methoxybenzyl)phenethylamine
- Routes of administration: Oral, others
- Drug class: Serotonin 5-HT_{2A} receptor agonist; Serotonergic psychedelic; Hallucinogen
- ATC code: None

Legal status
- Legal status: DE: NpSG (Industrial and scientific use only); UK: Class A; US: Unscheduled

Pharmacokinetic data
- Duration of action: ~2–3 hours

Identifiers
- IUPAC name: N-(2-Methoxybenzyl)-2-(3,4,5-trimethoxyphenyl)ethan-1-amine
- CAS Number: 1354632-01-1
- PubChem CID: 57501069
- ChemSpider: 25949200
- UNII: NS6YSG7F4H
- CompTox Dashboard (EPA): DTXSID601032854

Chemical and physical data
- Formula: C_{19}H_{25}NO_{4}
- Molar mass: 331.412 g·mol^{−1}
- 3D model (JSmol): Interactive image
- SMILES: COC1=CC=CC=C1CNCCC2=CC(=C(C(=C2)OC)OC)OC
- InChI: InChI=1S/C19H25NO4/c1-21-16-8-6-5-7-15(16)13-20-10-9-14-11-17(22-2)19(24-4)18(12-14)23-3/h5-8,11-12,20H,9-10,13H2,1-4H3; Key:USPSMWCGHVXKMN-UHFFFAOYSA-N

NBOMe-mescaline, also known as mescaline-NBOMe, M-NBOMe, or N-(2-methoxybenzyl)-3,4,5-trimethoxyphenethylamine, is a serotonin receptor agonist and putative psychedelic drug of the phenethylamine, scaline, and N-benzylphenethylamine (NBOMe) families. It is the N-(2-methoxybenzyl) derivative of mescaline.

== Use and effects ==
The active dose range of NBOMe-mescaline in humans has not been clearly reported and hence is unknown. This is in notable contrast to many other NBOMe drugs.

However, Daniel Trachsel has reported that NBOMe-mescaline at an oral dose of 50 mg three times separated by 1.5 hours each (150 mg total over about 4.5 hours) produced hallucinogenic effects and was somewhat more potent than mescaline, but only lasted 5 or 6 hours with the employed dosing scheme. It was estimated that the duration if a single dose were to be taken would probably be about 2 to 3 hours. NBOMe drugs are known to have very poor oral bioavailability, so NBOMe-mescaline could be much more potent by parenteral routes such as sublingual or intranasal administration.

In terms of its effects, NBOMe-mescaline was described as somehow shifting the axis of the field of vision. Its effects, or rather after-effects, were described as unpleasant.

== Pharmacology ==
=== Pharmacodynamics ===
NBOMe-mescaline activities
Target	Affinity (K_{i}, nM)
5-HT_{1A}	21,000
5-HT_{1B}	ND
5-HT_{1D}	ND
5-HT_{1E}	ND
5-HT_{1F}	ND
5-HT_{2A}	140 (K_{i}); 3,000 (EC_{50}); 33% (E_{max})
5-HT_{2B}	ND (K_{i}) >20,000 (EC_{50}); IA (E_{max})
5-HT_{2C}	640 (K_{i}); ND (EC_{50}); ND (E_{max})
5-HT_{3}	ND
5-HT_{4}	ND
5-HT_{5A}	ND
5-HT_{6}	ND
5-HT_{7}	ND
α_{1A}	3,000
α_{1B}, α_{1D}	ND
α_{2A}	810
α_{2B}, α_{2C}	ND
β_{1}–β_{3}	ND
D_{1}	>14,000
D_{2}	9,600
D_{3}	>17,000
D_{4}, D_{5}	ND
H_{1}	14,000
H_{2}–H_{4}	ND
M_{1}–M_{5}	ND
I_{1}	ND
σ_{1}, σ_{2}	ND
ORs	ND
TAAR1	>20,000 (K_{i}) (mouse); 13,000 (K_{i}) (rat) >30,000 (EC_{50}) (mouse) >30,000 (EC_{50}) (rat) >10,000 (EC_{50}) (human); IA (E_{max}) (mouse); IA (E_{max}) (rat)
SERT	24,000 (K_{i}); 85,000 (IC_{50}); ND (EC_{50})
NET	46,000 (K_{i}); 89,000 (IC_{50}); ND (EC_{50})
DAT	>30,000 (K_{i}); 449,000 (IC_{50}); ND (EC_{50})
Notes: The smaller the value, the more avidly the drug binds to the site. All proteins are human unless otherwise specified. Refs:

NBOMe-mescaline is a partial agonist of serotonin receptors, with a 5-HT_{2A} pK_{i} originally reported as 7.3 (i.e. K_{i} of approximately 50 nM), though more modern techniques assayed it as 140 nM at 5-HT_{2A} and 640 nM at 5-HT_{2C}, making it one of the least potent compounds among the N-benzylphenethylamines. Nonetheless, it is 68-fold more potent than mescaline as a serotonin 5-HT_{2A} receptor agonist in vitro. However, in another study, it was only about 3.3-fold more potent as a serotonin 5-HT_{2A} receptor agonist compared to mescaline in vitro. The interactions of NBOMe-mescaline with various receptors and transporters have been characterized and described.

== Chemistry ==
Solubility of the hydrochloride salt: ~5 mg/ml in Phosphate Buffered Saline (PBS) @ pH 7.2; ~10 mg/ml in ethanol & DMF; ~20 mg/ml in DMSO.

=== Synthesis ===
NBOMe-mescaline can be synthesized from mescaline and 2-methoxybenzaldehyde, via reductive alkylation. That can be done stepwise by first making the imine and then reducing the formed imine with sodium borohydride, or by direct reaction with sodium triacetoxyborohydride. An alternative production method which removes the need to obtain the illegal compound mescaline as an isolated precursor can be achieved via a one-pot reaction utilizing 3,4,5-trimethoxyphenylacetonitrile with Lithium Aluminium Hydride as a reducing agent.

== History ==
NBOMe-mescaline and NBOMe-escaline were first reported in 1999 resulting from research performed at Free University of Berlin concerning their activity as partial agonists at rat vascular 5-HT_{2A} receptors. NBOMe-mescaline was first reported in September 2008 to have been self administered by humans as a psychedelic drug at some unspecified point prior. It first became available as a commodity in the research chemical market in May 2010 several months after a few 25x-NBOMes became available.

== Society and culture ==
=== Legal status ===
==== International ====
NBOMe-mescaline is not listed in the schedules set out by the United Nations' Single Convention on Narcotic Drugs from 1961 nor their Convention on Psychotropic Substances from 1971, so the signatory countries to these international drug control treaties are not required by said treaties to control NBOMe-mescaline.

==== Canada ====
NBOMe-mescaline is not a controlled substance in Canada as of 2025.

==== United Kingdom ====
This substance is a Class A drug in the United Kingdom as a result of the N-benzylphenethylamine catch-all clause in the Misuse of Drugs Act 1971.

==== United States ====
NBOMe-mescaline is not listed in the list of scheduled controlled substances in the USA. It is therefore not scheduled at the federal level in the United States, but it is possible that NBOMe-mescaline could legally be considered an analog of mescaline, and therefore sales or possession could potentially be prosecuted under the Federal Analogue Act.

== See also ==
- Scaline
- N-Benzylphenethylamine
- NBOMe-escaline
- Mescaline-FLY
- 2,4,6-TMPEA-NBOMe
- DOM-NBOMe
- 5-APB-NBOMe
- 2C2-NBOMe
