= FLY (psychedelics) =

Class of chemical compounds

2C-B-FLY, an example of a FLY psychedelic.

2C-B-DragonFLY, an example of a DragonFLY psychedelic.

2C-B-ButterFLY, an example of a ButterFLY psychedelic.

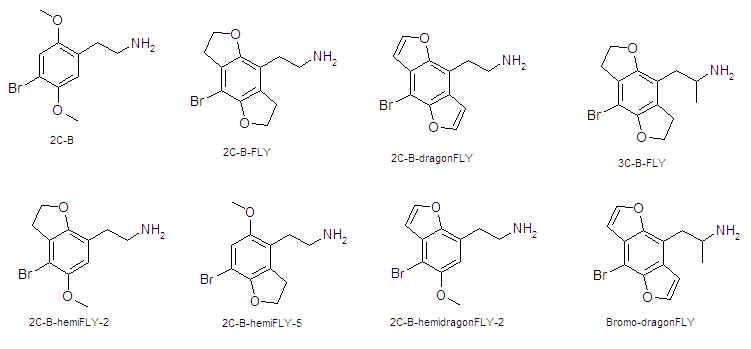
Examples of different FLY drugs.

FLY is a family of phenethylamine and benzofuran psychedelics possessing a benzodifuran or similar ring system. The FLY drugs were so-named because of the resemblance of their chemical structures to flying insects like dragonflies and butterflies. They are analogues of 2,5-dimethoxyphenethylamines in which the 2- and 5-position methoxy groups have been cyclized into furan and/or tetrahydrofuran rings. They may be 2C, DOx, 25-NB, or other FLY versions of psychedelic phenethylamines.

Examples of different types of FLY drugs, in the case of the base psychedelic 2C-B, include 2C-B-FLY, 2C-B-DragonFLY, and 2C-B-ButterFLY, among others. BromoDragonFLY (DOB-DragonFLY) is known for its very high potency and its toxicity in overdose. 2C-B-FLY was Ann Shulgin's favorite psychedelic.

Several of the FLY drugs have been shown to act as potent serotonin 5-HT_{2} receptor agonists.

== Use and effects ==
According to Alexander Shulgin, active doses or dose ranges of FLY drugs are 2.5 to 10 mg orally for 2C-B-FLY, 1 mg orally for DOB-FLY, and 100 μg intramuscularly for Bromo-DragonFLY. Other sources provide dose ranges of 0.2 to 0.8 mg orally for Bromo-DragonFLY, 1 mg orally for DOB-FLY, and 10 to 20 mg for 2C-B-FLY. For comparison, 2C-B has a dose range of 12 to 24 mg orally while DOB has a dose range of 1 to 3 mg orally.

Oral doses and durations of FLY psychedelics
Compound	Dose	Duration
2C-B-FLY	2.5–10 mg or 10–20 mg (2–25 mg+)	Unknown
DOB-FLY	1 mg	Unknown
Bromo-DragonFLY	0.2–0.8 mg (0.2–1 mg+)	12–24 hours^{a}
Footnotes: ^{a} Bromo-DragonFLY can have a delayed onset of up to 6 hours and can have a duration of up to 2 to 3 days in some cases. Refs: Individual:

== History ==
The FLY drugs were first described in the scientific literature by Aaron Phillip Monte and David E. Nichols and colleagues at Purdue University by 1995.

== List of FLY drugs ==
=== 2C FLY drugs ===
- 2C-B-FLY
- 2C-B-ButterFLY (2C-B-MOTH)
- 2C-B-DragonFLY (2C-B-DFLY)
- 2C-B-5-hemiFLY
- 2C-C-FLY
- 2C-I-FLY
- 2C-DFLY (2C-H-DragonFLY; 2C-H-DFLY)
- 2C-D-FLY
- 2C-E-FLY
- 2C-EF-FLY
- 2C-T-7-FLY

=== DOx FLY drugs ===
- Bromo-DragonFLY (DOB-Dragonfly; DOB-DFLY)
- DOB-ANTH
- DOB-FLY (3C-B-FLY)
- DOB-2-DragonFLY-5-ButterFLY
- DOB-5-hemiFLY (bromo-semi-FLY; B-SF)
- DOB-ButterFLY (DOB-MOTH)
- DOH-5-hemiFLY (semi-FLY; SF)
- DOI-2-hemiFLY
- DOM-FLY
- DOMOM-FLY
- DragonFLY (DFLY; DOH-FLY)
- FLY (DOH-FLY)
- TFMFly (TFM-FLY; DOTFM-FLY)

=== 25-NB FLY drugs ===
- 2C-B-Fly-NBOMe (NBOMe-2CB-Fly)
- 2C-B-DragonFLY-NBOH
- 2C-B-FLY-NB2EtO5Cl

=== Cyclized FLY drugs ===
- 2C-B-5-hemiFLY-α6 (BNAP)
- 2CB7 (2C-B-5-hemiFLY-β7)

=== Other FLY drugs ===
- Diaza-2C-DFLY
- Hemi-flyscaline (mescaline-hemiFLY)
- Mescaline-FLY (flyscaline)

== Related compounds ==
- 9-Aminomethyl-9,10-dihydroanthracene (AMDA)
- F (F-1; 5-methoxy-6-APDB)

== See also ==
- Substituted phenethylamine
- Substituted amphetamine
- Substituted benzofuran
- Substituted methoxyphenethylamine
- 2C, DOx, 4C, 25-NB, scaline, 3C
- PiHKAL (Phenethylamines I Have Known and Loved)
- The Shulgin Index, Volume One: Psychedelic Phenethylamines and Related Compounds
