= FAEFHI =

Clinical data
- Other names: 4-(2-Aminoethyl)-5-hydroxyindole
- Drug class: Serotonin receptor modulator; Partial ergoline
- ATC code: None

Identifiers
- IUPAC name: 4-(2-aminoethyl)-1H-indol-5-ol
- PubChem CID: 82599144
- ChemSpider: 37497573

Chemical and physical data
- Formula: C_{10}H_{12}N_{2}O
- Molar mass: 176.219 g·mol^{−1}
- 3D model (JSmol): Interactive image
- SMILES: C1=CC(=C(C2=C1NC=C2)CCN)O
- InChI: InChI=1S/C10H12N2O/c11-5-3-8-7-4-6-12-9(7)1-2-10(8)13/h1-2,4,6,12-13H,3,5,11H2; Key:CSFAMKTUFIKJAE-UHFFFAOYSA-N

FAEFHI, also known as 4-(2-aminoethyl)-5-hydroxyindole, is a serotonin receptor modulator of the indole group related to serotonin and other tryptamines. It is a positional isomer of serotonin in which the ethylamine side chain at the 3 position of the indole ring system has been moved to the 4 position. FAEFHI can also be thought of as a greatly simplified analogue of LSD and hence partial ergoline. Although FAEFHI shows significant affinity for serotonin receptors, it had much lower affinity than serotonin or tryptamine (171-fold lower than serotonin and 5-fold lower than tryptamine). In addition, it did not show serotonin-like activity (i.e., serotonin receptor agonism) even at very high concentrations in vitro. FAEFHI was first described in the scientific literature by 1984.

== See also ==
- Partial ergoline
- Diaza-2C-DFLY
- FHATHBIN
- Ropinirole
- RU-27251
- UCD0179
- WXVL_BT0793LQ2118
