= DragonFLY =

Clinical data
- Other names: DFLY; H-DFLY
- Drug class: Serotonin receptor agonist; Serotonin 5-HT_{2A} receptor agonist
- ATC code: None

Identifiers
- IUPAC name: 1-furo[2,3-f][1]benzofuran-4-ylpropan-2-amine
- CAS Number: 260809-94-7
- PubChem CID: 75295900
- ChemSpider: 74206731

Chemical and physical data
- Formula: C_{13}H_{13}NO_{2}
- Molar mass: 215.252 g·mol^{−1}
- 3D model (JSmol): Interactive image
- SMILES: CC(CC1=C2C(=CC3=C1C=CO3)C=CO2)N
- InChI: InChI=1S/C13H13NO2/c1-8(14)6-11-10-3-5-15-12(10)7-9-2-4-16-13(9)11/h2-5,7-8H,6,14H2,1H3; Key:RZXKDUYUWHJRCH-UHFFFAOYSA-N

DragonFLY, also known as DFLY or H-DFLY, is a serotonin receptor agonist of the phenethylamine, DOx, and FLY families. It is the "dragonFLY" (benzodifuran) analogue of 2,5-dimethoxyamphetamine (2,5-DMA or DOH).

== Pharmacology ==
The enantiomers of DFLY, (R)-DFLY and (S)-DFLY, show affinity and activity at the serotonin 5-HT_{2} receptors. At the serotonin 5-HT_{2A} receptor, the affinity (K_{i}) of (R)-DFLY was 1.5 nM and of (S)-DFLY was 37.9 nM, while at the serotonin 5-HT_{2C} receptor, the affinity (K_{i}) of (R)-DFLY was 0.79 nM and of (S)-DFLY was 6.0 nM. In terms of activational potency at the serotonin 5-HT_{2A} receptor, the EC_{50} (E_{max}) of (R)-DFLY was 590 nM (76%) while that of (S)-DFLY was 650 nM (68%). The enantiomers of DFLY have far greater activity as serotonin 5-HT_{2A} receptor agonists than (R)-2,5-DMA but show dramatically lower potency than 4-substituted FLY analogues like Bromo-DragonFLY.

DFLY was included and described as an entry in Alexander Shulgin's 2011 book The Shulgin Index, Volume One: Psychedelic Phenethylamines and Related Compounds. However, it is not known to have been assessed in animals or humans, and hence it is unknown whether DFLY has psychedelic or other psychoactive effects in humans.

== History ==
DFLY was first described in the scientific literature by at least 1999. It was not an explicitly controlled substance in the United States as of 2011.

== Society and culture ==
=== Legal status ===
==== Canada ====
DragonFLY is a controlled substance in Canada under phenethylamine blanket-ban language.

== See also ==
- Substituted methoxyphenethylamine
- FLY (psychedelics)
- Substituted benzofuran
- DOH-FLY (FLY)
