= DOB-5-hemiFLY =

Clinical data
- Other names: Bromo-semi-fly; B-Semi-fly; B-SF; 5-MeO-7-Br-4-APDB; 7-Bromo-2,3-dihydro-5-methoxy-α-methyl-4-benzofuranethanamine; F-4A5,7B; DOB-5-HEMIFLY
- Drug class: Serotonin receptor modulator; Serotonergic psychedelic; Hallucinogen
- ATC code: None

Identifiers
- IUPAC name: 1-(7-bromo-5-methoxy-2,3-dihydro-1-benzofuran-4-yl)propan-2-amine
- CAS Number: 178557-10-3
- PubChem CID: 10891445
- ChemSpider: 9066709
- ChEMBL: ChEMBL94982

Chemical and physical data
- Formula: C_{12}H_{16}BrNO_{2}
- Molar mass: 286.169 g·mol^{−1}
- 3D model (JSmol): Interactive image
- SMILES: CC(CC1=C2CCOC2=C(C=C1OC)Br)N
- InChI: InChI=1S/C12H16BrNO2/c1-7(14)5-9-8-3-4-16-12(8)10(13)6-11(9)15-2/h6-7H,3-5,14H2,1-2H3; Key:PKJQSBXFDIUPBW-UHFFFAOYSA-N

DOB-5-hemiFLY, also known as bromo-semi-fly (B-SF) or as 5-MeO-7-Br-4-APDB, is a putative serotonergic psychedelic of the phenethylamine, amphetamine, DOx, and benzofuran families related to DOB and DOB-FLY. It is the derivative of DOB in which the methoxy group at the 5 position has been cyclized with the benzene ring to form a dihydrofuran group or benzodihydrofuran ring system. The drug differs from the FLY psychedelics DOB-FLY and Bromo-DragonFLY (DOB-DFLY) in that only one of the methoxy groups has been cyclized rather than both.

== Use and effects ==
The properties and effects of DOB-5-hemiFLY in humans are unknown.

== Pharmacology ==
=== Pharmacodynamics ===
DOB-5-hemiFLY shows high affinity for the serotonin 5-HT_{2} receptors, including for the 5-HT_{2A} receptor (K_{i} = 3.1 nM). Its affinity for this receptor is similar to that of DOB. The drug fully substitutes for LSD in rodent drug discrimination tests and shows high potency in this regard, with potency similar to that of DOB as well.

== Chemistry ==
=== Synthesis ===
The chemical synthesis of DOB-5-hemiFLY has been described.

=== Derivatives ===
Derivatives of DOB-5-hemiFLY include DOB-FLY and Bromo-DragonFLY (DOB-DFLY).

== History ==
DOB-5-hemiFLY was first described in the scientific literature by David E. Nichols and colleagues in 1991. It was included as an entry in Alexander Shulgin's 2011 book The Shulgin Index, Volume One: Psychedelic Phenethylamines and Related Compounds.

== Society and culture ==
=== Legal status ===
==== United States ====
DOB-5-hemiFLY is not an explicitly controlled substance in the United States as of 2011.

== See also ==
- DOx (psychedelics)
- FLY (psychedelics)
- DOH-5-hemiFLY (semi-fly; SF)
