= PIM-35 =

Chemical compound

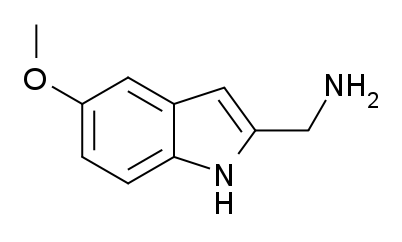

Clinical data
- ATC code: none

Legal status
- Legal status: In general: uncontrolled

Identifiers
- IUPAC name: (5-methoxy-1H-indol-2-yl)methanamine
- CAS Number: 130445-55-5
- PubChem CID: 195658
- ChemSpider: 20476602
- UNII: 3GCJ2W5LXZ
- CompTox Dashboard (EPA): DTXSID50926741

Chemical and physical data
- Formula: C_{10}H_{12}N_{2}O
- Molar mass: 176.219 g·mol^{−1}
- 3D model (JSmol): Interactive image
- SMILES: COC1=CC2=C(C=C1)NC(=C2)CN

PIM-35, also known as 5-methoxyindolyl-2-methylamine, is a drug which is an indole derivative with a similar chemical structure to that of serotonin. It acts as a serotonin reuptake inhibitor and produces antidepressant-like effects in animal studies.
