= 2C-B-DragonFLY =

Psychedelic drug

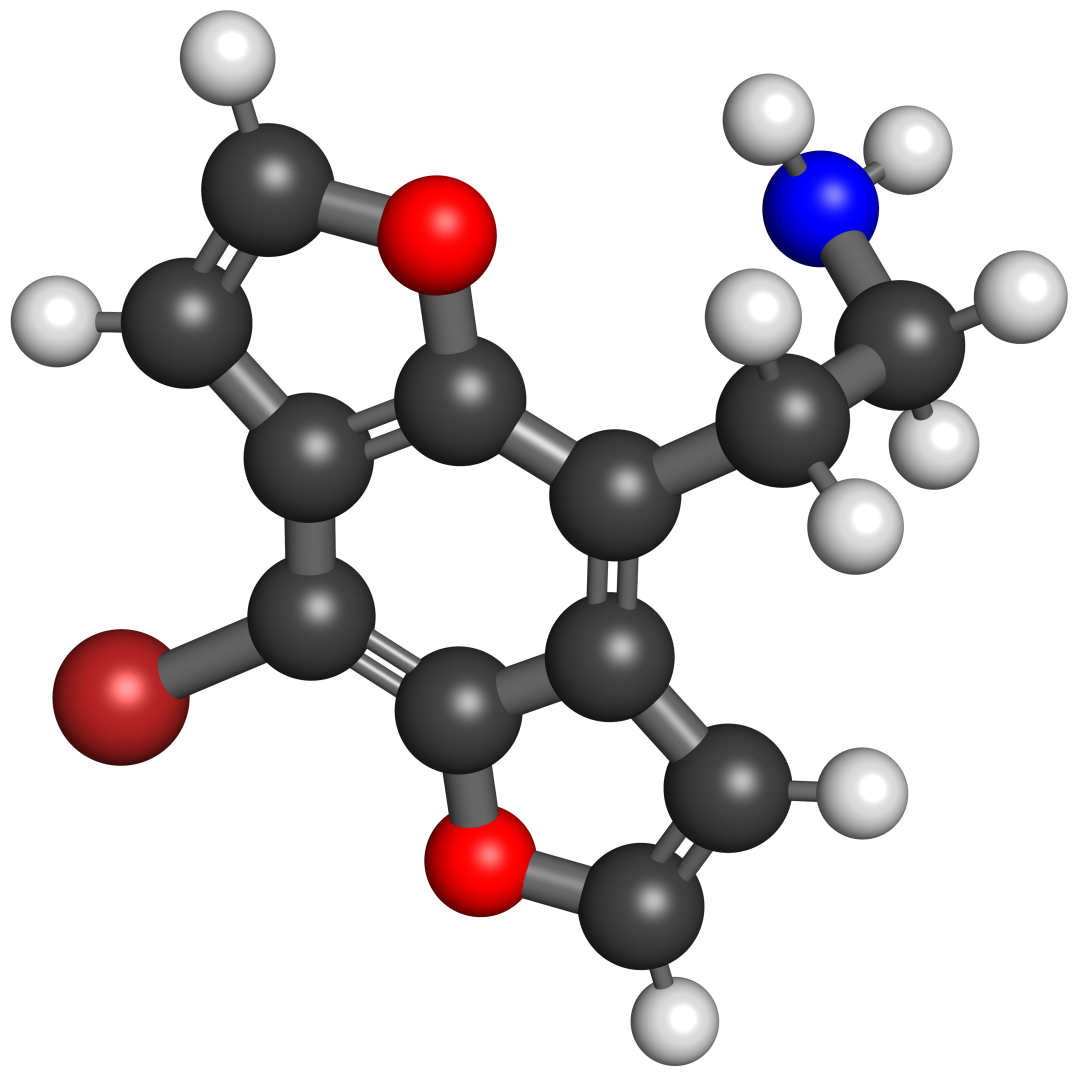

Clinical data
- Other names: 2C-B-DFLY
- Drug class: Serotonergic psychedelic; Hallucinogen

Legal status
- Legal status: In general unscheduled

Identifiers
- IUPAC name: 2-(4-bromofuro[2,3-f][1]benzofuran-8-yl)ethanamine
- CAS Number: 260809-98-1
- PubChem CID: 91753712
- ChemSpider: 26579078
- UNII: 6MJC3S9XTH

Chemical and physical data
- Formula: C_{12}H_{10}BrNO_{2}
- Molar mass: 280.121 g·mol^{−1}
- 3D model (JSmol): Interactive image
- SMILES: C1=COC2=C(C3=C(C(=C21)CCN)OC=C3)Br
- InChI: InChI=1S/C12H10BrNO2/c13-10-9-3-6-15-11(9)7(1-4-14)8-2-5-16-12(8)10/h2-3,5-6H,1,4,14H2; Key:JWBRIUSZWWDKGO-UHFFFAOYSA-N

2C-B-DragonFLY, also known as 2C-B-DFLY, is a psychedelic drug of the phenethylamine, 2C, and FLY families. It is the "DragonFLY" (benzodifuran) analogue of 2C-B and 2C-B-FLY as well as the phenethylamine (α-desmethyl) analogue of Bromo-DragonFLY (DOB-DFLY).

== Use and effects ==
The properties and effects of 2C-B-DragonFLY in humans do not appear to be known.

== Pharmacology ==
=== Pharmacodynamics ===
2C-B-DragonFLY's predicted affinity (K_{i}) for the serotonin 5-HT_{2A} receptor has been reported to be 26 nM. It produces the head-twitch response, a behavioral proxy of psychedelic effects, in rodents. 2C-B-DragonFLY is about 2.2-fold more potent than 2C-B and about 1.7-fold more potent than 2C-B-FLY in terms of this effect. On the other hand, it is about 5-fold less potent than Bromo-DragonFLY in producing the head-twitch response in rodents. These findings demonstrate the importance of the fully aromatic benzodifuran ring system for optimal serotonin 5-HT_{2A} receptor interaction, though 2C-B-DragonFLY is still considerably less potent than Bromo-DragonFLY.

== Chemistry ==
=== Analogues ===
Analogues of 2C-B-DragonFLY include 2C-B, 2C-B-FLY, 2C-B-ButterFLY, and Bromo-DragonFLY (DOB-DFLY), among others.

== History ==
2C-B-DragonFLY was first described in the scientific literature by 1999. Subsequently, its pharmacology was described by Adam Halberstadt and colleagues in 2019.

== Society and culture ==
=== Legal status ===
==== Canada ====
2C-B-DragonFLY is a controlled substance in Canada under phenethylamine blanket-ban language.

==== United States ====
2C-B-DragonFLY is not an explicitly controlled substance in the United States.

== See also ==
- FLY (psychedelics)
- Substituted benzofuran
