= TFMFly =

Psychedelic drug

Clinical data
- Other names: TFM-FLY; TFM-Fly; DOTFM-FLY
- Drug class: Serotonin receptor modulator; Serotonin 5-HT_{2A} receptor agonist

Legal status
- Legal status: CA: Schedule I; UK: Under Psychoactive Substances Act; Unscheduled (in general); Illegal in Latvia

Identifiers
- IUPAC name: 1-[4-(trifluoromethyl)-2,3,6,7-tetrahydrofuro[2,3-f][1]benzofuran-8-yl]propan-2-amine
- CAS Number: 780744-19-6 332012-20-1 (hydrochloride)
- PubChem CID: 57507897
- ChemSpider: 57566595
- UNII: 9FHU874G42
- ChEMBL: ChEMBL1177908
- CompTox Dashboard (EPA): DTXSID10726966

Chemical and physical data
- Formula: C_{14}H_{16}F_{3}NO_{2}
- Molar mass: 287.282 g·mol^{−1}
- 3D model (JSmol): Interactive image
- SMILES: CC(CC1=C2CCOC2=C(C3=C1OCC3)C(F)(F)F)N
- InChI: InChI=1S/C14H16F3NO2/c1-7(18)6-10-8-2-4-20-13(8)11(14(15,16)17)9-3-5-19-12(9)10/h7H,2-6,18H2,1H3; Key:KMWGSFWAZUVTCM-UHFFFAOYSA-N

TFMFly, or TFM-FLY, also known as DOTFM-FLY, is a serotonin receptor modulator of the phenethylamine, amphetamine and DOx, and FLY families related to psychedelics like DOTFM and DOB-FLY.

== Pharmacology ==
=== Pharmacodynamics ===
It acts as a potent agonist at the 5HT_{2A} serotonin receptor subtype, and is a chiral compound with the more active (R) enantiomer having a K_{i} of 0.12 nM at the human 5-HT_{2A} receptor. While the fully aromatic benzodifurans such as Bromo-DragonFLY generally have higher binding affinity than saturated compounds like 2C-B-FLY, the saturated compounds have higher efficacy as agonists.

== Chemistry ==
=== Synthesis ===
The chemical synthesis of TFMFly has been described.

=== Analogues ===
Analogues of TFMFly include DOTFM, DOB-FLY, and 25TFM-NBOMe, among others.

== History ==
TFMFly was first reported by a team at Purdue University led by David E. Nichols in 2001.

== Society and culture ==
=== Legal status ===
==== Latvia ====
TFMFly is illegal in Latvia.

== See also ==
- FLY (psychedelics)
