= 2CBFly-NBOMe =

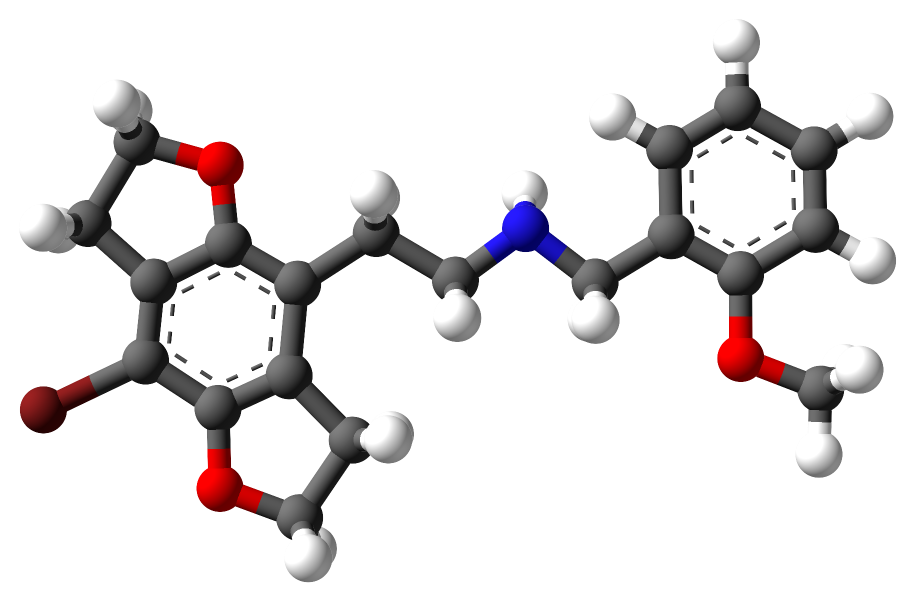

Clinical data
- Other names: 2C-B-FLY-NBOMe; NBOMe-2C-B-FLY; Cimbi-31; N-(2-Methoxybenzyl)-2C-B-FLY
- Drug class: Serotonin receptor modulator; Serotonin 5-HT_{2A} receptor agonist
- ATC code: None

Identifiers
- IUPAC name: 2-(8-bromo-2,3,6,7-tetrahydrobenzo[1,2-b:4,5-b′]difuran-4-yl)-N-[(2-methoxyphenyl)methyl]ethan-1-amine
- CAS Number: 1335331-42-4
- PubChem CID: 57469208
- ChemSpider: 26234936
- UNII: Q7PG4YH2H4
- CompTox Dashboard (EPA): DTXSID40726752

Chemical and physical data
- Formula: C_{20}H_{22}BrNO_{3}
- Molar mass: 404.304 g·mol^{−1}
- 3D model (JSmol): Interactive image
- SMILES: COc1ccccc1CNCCc1c2CCOc2c(Br)c2CCOc12
- InChI: InChI=1S/C20H22BrNO3/c1-23-17-5-3-2-4-13(17)12-22-9-6-14-15-7-10-25-20(15)18(21)16-8-11-24-19(14)16/h2-5,22H,6-12H2,1H3; Key:CUFCITSPWAZWHS-UHFFFAOYSA-N

2CBFly-NBOMe, also known as NBOMe-2C-B-FLY or as Cimbi-31, is a serotonin receptor modulator of the phenethylamine, DOx, and FLY families. It was indirectly derived from the phenethylamine hallucinogen 2C-B is and related to benzodifurans like 2C-B-FLY and N-benzylphenethylamines like 25B-NBOMe.

== Pharmacology ==
=== Pharmacodynamics ===
2CBFly-NBOMe acts as a potent partial agonist for the 5-HT_{2A} serotonin receptor subtype.

== Chemistry ==
=== Analogues ===
Analogues of 2CBFly-NBOMe include 2C-B-FLY and 25B-NBOMe, among others.

== History ==
2CBFly-NBOMe was discovered in 2002, and further researched by Ralf Heim at the Free University of Berlin, and subsequently investigated in more detail by a team at Purdue University led by David E. Nichols.

== Society and culture ==
=== Legal status ===
==== Canada ====
2CBFly-NBOMe is a controlled substance in Canada under phenethylamine blanket-ban language.

==== United Kingdom ====
This substance is a Class A drug in the United Kingdom as a result of the N-benzylphenethylamine catch-all clause in the Misuse of Drugs Act 1971.

==== United States ====
2CBFly-NBOMe is not an explicitly controlled substance in the United States. However, it could be considered a controlled substance under the Federal Analogue Act if intended for human consumption.

2CBFly-NBOMe is a controlled substance in Vermont as of January 2016.

== See also ==
- 25-NB (psychedelics)
- FLY (psychedelics)
