= Bromo-DragonFLY =

Psychedelic drug

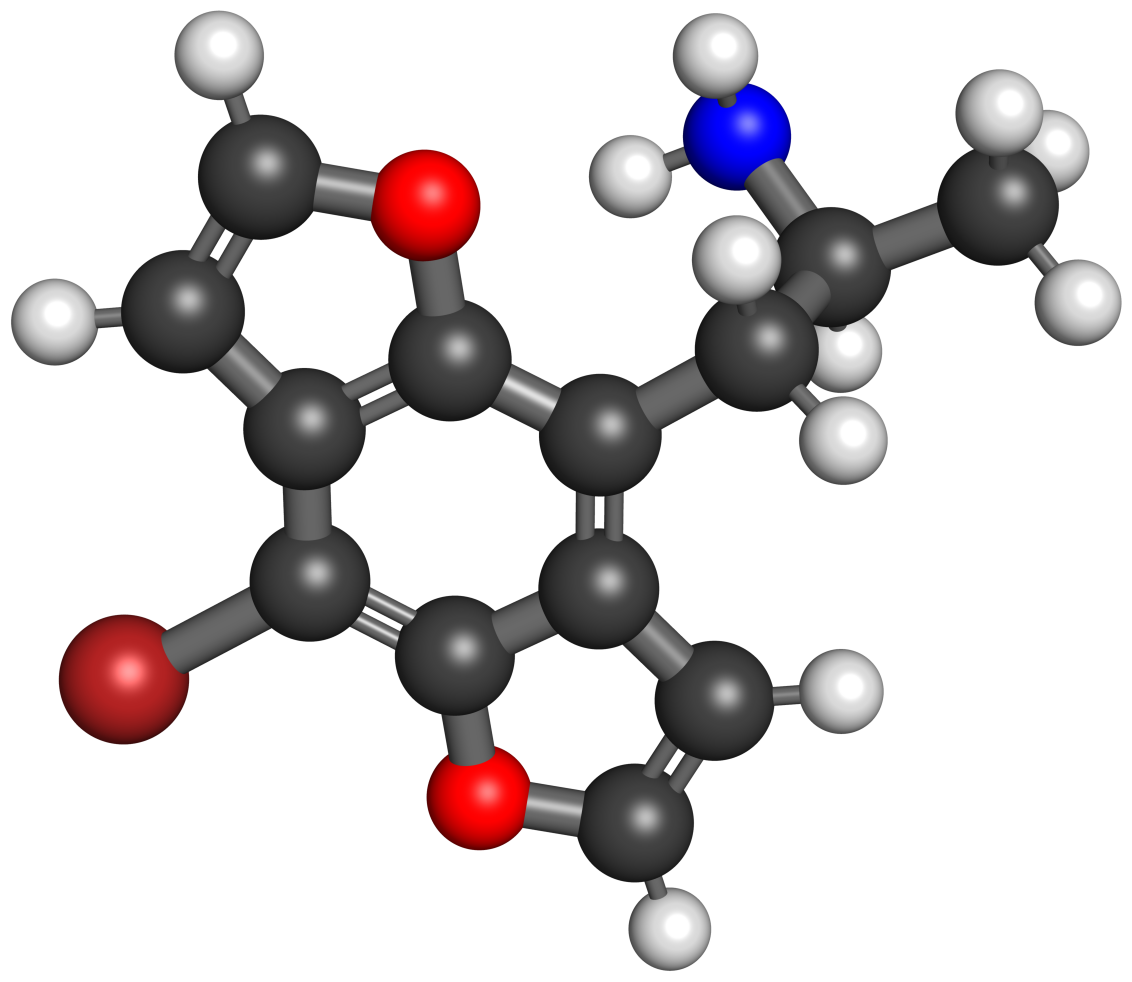

Clinical data
- Other names: BDF; B-DFLY; DOB-DragonFLY; DOB-DFLY; 3C-Bromo-DragonFLY
- Routes of administration: Oral
- Drug class: Serotonin 5-HT_{2} receptor agonist; Serotonin 5-HT_{2A} receptor agonist; Serotonergic psychedelic; Hallucinogen; Monoamine oxidase inhibitor (MAOI); Reversible inhibitor of monoamine oxidase A (RIMA)
- ATC code: None

Legal status
- Legal status: AU: Unscheduled; CA: Unscheduled; DE: Unscheduled; UK: Unscheduled, illegal under the Psychoactive Substances Act 2016; US: Unscheduled (Illegal in Oklahoma); UN: Unscheduled

Pharmacokinetic data
- Onset of action: Up to 6 hours
- Duration of action: 12–24 hours or up to 2–3 days

Identifiers
- IUPAC name: 1-(4-bromofuro[2,3-f][1]benzofuran-8-yl)propan-2-amine
- CAS Number: 219986-94-4
- PubChem CID: 9839057
- ChemSpider: 8014776
- UNII: GC9M7R36OI
- ChEMBL: ChEMBL149024

Chemical and physical data
- Formula: C_{13}H_{12}BrNO_{2}
- Molar mass: 294.148 g·mol^{−1}
- 3D model (JSmol): Interactive image
- SMILES: CC(N)Cc1c2ccoc2c(Br)c2ccoc12
- InChI: InChI=1S/C13H12BrNO2/c1-7(15)6-10-8-2-4-17-13(8)11(14)9-3-5-16-12(9)10/h2-5,7H,6,15H2,1H3; Key:GIKPTWKWYXCBEC-UHFFFAOYSA-N

Bromo-DragonFLY, also known as DOB-DragonFLY (DOB-DFLY), is a psychedelic drug of the phenethylamine, DOx, and FLY families. It is taken orally. The drug has a delayed onset of up to 6 hours and a very long duration of up to 1 to 3 days.

Side effects of Bromo-DragonFLY include nausea and vomiting, headache, tachycardia, hypertension, anxiety, panic attacks, pupil dilation, convulsions and vasoconstriction, among others. The drug acts as an agonist of the serotonin 5-HT_{2} receptors, including the serotonin 5-HT_{2A}, 5-HT_{2B}, and 5-HT_{2C} receptors. It is also a potent monoamine oxidase A (MAO-A) inhibitor.

Bromo-DragonFLY was first described in the scientific literature by David E. Nichols and colleagues in 1998. It was encountered as a novel designer drug in 2006. The drug has been associated with an unusually high degree of toxicity and numerous hospitalizations and fatalities. It has become a controlled substance in various countries in the world.

== Use and effects ==
Bromo-DragonFLY was not included nor mentioned in Alexander Shulgin's 1991 book PiHKAL (Phenethylamines I Have Known and Loved) as it had not yet been discovered. However, he subsequently described it in his 2011 book The Shulgin Index, Volume One: Psychedelic Phenethylamines and Related Compounds. The dose range of Bromo-DragonFLY is not precisely known, but typical doses are in the range of 100 to 1,000 μg orally. However, a death has been reported at approximately 700 μg Bromo-DragonFLY. Its onset can be delayed by up to 6 hours and its duration is in the range of 12 to 24 hours for many users, but can be up to 2 to 3 days. The drug's effects include profound hallucinations and visual distortions, sound alterations, a sense of connection or belonging with other realities, a sense of peace and well-being, emotional stimulation, and meeting with entities.

== Side effects ==
The side effects of Bromo-DragonFLY have been described.

== Overdose and toxicity ==
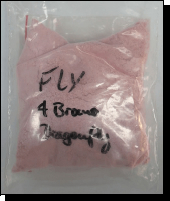
Bromo-DragonFLY powder. The pink color is most likely due to an impurity. The color of pure Bromo-DragonFLY is usually white to off-white.

The toxicity of Bromo-DragonFLY appears to be fairly high for humans, with reports of at least five deaths believed to have resulted from Bromo-DragonFLY in Norway, Sweden, Denmark, Finland and the United States.

Laboratory testing has confirmed that in October 2009, a batch of Bromo-DragonFLY was distributed, mislabeled as the related compound 2C-B-FLY, which is around 20 times less potent than BDF by weight. This mistake is believed to have contributed to several lethal overdoses and additional hospitalizations. The batch implicated in these deaths also contained significant synthesis impurities, which may have contributed to the toxicity.

Vasoconstrictive action resulting from severe overdose of Bromo-DragonFLY is known to have caused tissue necrosis of the extremities in at least one case. In September 2007, a 35-year-old Swedish male required amputation of the front part of his feet and several fingers on one hand after taking a massive (but unknown) overdose; reportedly, the compound acted as a long-acting efficacious vasoconstrictor, leading to necrosis and gangrene which became apparent several weeks after the overdose occurred. Treatment was of limited efficacy in this case, although tolazoline is reportedly an effective treatment where available.

Overdose-associated disturbing experiences and health problems have been described. One case in 2008 in England involved inhalation of vomit, causing nearly fatal asphyxia. Seizures have also been reported.

On October 3, 2009, a 22-year-old male from Copenhagen died after ingesting Bromo-DragonFLY. His friend described the trip saying, "It was like being dragged to hell and back again. Many times. It is the most evil [thing] I've ever tried. It lasted an eternity."

On May 7, 2011, in the United States, two young adults died after overdosing on Bromo-DragonFLY, which they thought was 2C-E, and several others were hospitalized during the same incident. Because they took a dosage appropriate for 2C-E, those who took the drug received, in some cases, 100 times the normal dose. Both deaths followed seizures, vomiting blood, and terrifying hallucinations.

== Pharmacology ==
=== Pharmacodynamics ===
Bromo-DragonFLY activities
Target	Affinity (K_{i}, nM)
5-HT_{1A}	234
5-HT_{1B}	1,050
5-HT_{1D}	347
5-HT_{1E}	1,620
5-HT_{1F}	ND
5-HT_{2A}	0.04–1.86 (K_{i}); 0.141–4.79 (EC_{50}); 80–120% (E_{max})
5-HT_{2B}	0.126–0.19 (K_{i}); 0.0851–0.457 (EC_{50}); 75–105% (E_{max})
5-HT_{2C}	0.02–1.48 (K_{i}); 0.0617–4.90 (EC_{50}); 63–104% (E_{max})
5-HT_{3}	>10,000
5-HT_{4}	ND
5-HT_{5A}	>10,000
5-HT_{6}	339
5-HT_{7}	148
α_{1A}–α_{1D}	>10,000
α_{2A}	398
α_{2B}	550
α_{2C}	955
β_{1}	1,100
β_{2}	2,140
β_{3}	>10,000
D_{1}	955
D_{2}	2,240
D_{3}	417
D_{4}, D_{5}	>10,000
H_{1}–H_{4}	>10,000
M_{1}–M_{5}	>10,000
TAAR_{1}	ND
I_{1}	ND
σ_{1}	427
σ_{2}	2,340
SERT	4,070 (K_{i}); ND (IC_{50})
NET	>10,000 (K_{i}); ND (IC_{50})
DAT	>10,000 (K_{i}); ND (IC_{50})
MAO-A	352 (K_{i}); 540 (IC_{50})
MAO-B	IA (IC_{50})
Notes: The smaller the value, the more avidly the drug binds to the site. All proteins are human unless otherwise specified. Refs:

Bromo-DragonFLY has very high affinity for the serotonin 5-HT_{2} receptors, including for the serotonin 5-HT_{2A} receptor (K_{i} = 0.04 nM), serotonin 5-HT_{2B} receptor (K_{i} = 0.19 nM), and serotonin 5-HT_{2C} receptor (K_{i} = 0.02 nM). It is a highly potent high-efficacy partial agonist to full agonist of these three receptors. Bromo-DragonFLY is also a potent monoamine oxidase A (MAO-A) inhibitor, which may contribute to its risks. The comprehensive receptor interactions of Bromo-DragonFLY have been reported.

Bromo-DragonFLY produces the head-twitch response, a behavioral proxy of psychedelic effects, in rodents. It is among the most potent phenethylamine in terms of this effect, with similar potency as 25I-NBOMe. Bromo-DragonFLY was only slightly less potent than LSD in this assay. The drug also substitutes for LSD and DOI in rodent drug discrimination tests. Once again, it was among the most potent phenethylamines tested. Bromo-DragonFLY was slightly more potent than LSD in substituting for LSD in rodents, but was slightly less potent than LSD in substituting for DOI in rodents. It was the first known phenethylamine to surpass LSD in potency in this assay. In partial contrast to the preceding animal findings however, Bromo-DragonFLY is several-fold less potent as a psychedelic in humans than LSD but is similar in potency to 25I-NBOMe.

=== Pharmacokinetics ===
The in-vitro and in-silico pharmacokinetics of Bromo-DragonFLY have been studied.

== Chemistry ==
=== Synthesis ===
The first chemical synthesis of racemic Bromo-DragonFLY was reported by David E. Nichols in 1998 and was an expansion upon earlier research into the tetrahydrobenzodifuran analogue of DOB. The 1998 synthesis of racemic Bromo-DragonFLY starts from hydroquinone, which is dialkylated with 1-bromo-2-chloroethane, brominated, and treated with n-butyllithium to yield the tetrahydrobenzodifuran ring system. After formylation of the ring system, the nitropropene derivative was obtained by condensation with nitroethane under ammonium acetate catalysis. The nitropropene derivative was then reduced with lithium aluminium hydride to yield the amine intermediate, which was protected with trifluoroacetic anhydride. Following para-bromination with elemental bromine and oxidation of the tetrahydrobenzodifuran ring system with DDQ, the trifluoroacetyl protecting group of the amine was removed to give Bromo-DragonFLY as a racemic mixture of the R and S enantiomers.

In 2001, David E. Nichols reported an enantiospecific synthesis of Bromo-DragonFLY which allowed the individual R and S enantiomers to be studied. Further research determined that (R)-(-)-Bromo-DragonFLY possessed greater binding affinity at the 5-HT_{2A} and 5-HT_{2C} receptors than (S)-(-)-Bromo-DragonFLY. To synthesize the more active R enantiomer, a derivative of D-alanine was reacted with 2,3,6,7-tetrahydrobenzodifuran in a Friedel–Crafts acylation, yielding an intermediate containing a β-keto moiety which was removed by treatment with triethylsilane in trifluoroacetic acid. After para-bromination and oxidation of the ring system with DDQ, the amine was deprotected yielding (R)-(-)-Bromo-DragonFLY.

The 1998 synthesis of Bromo-DragonFLY by Nichols et al.

The 2001 enantiospecific synthesis of (R)-(-)-Bromo-DragonFLY by Nichols et al.

=== Analogues ===
Analogues of Bromo-DragonFLY (DOB-DFLY) include DOB, DOB-FLY, DOB-2-DRAGONFLY-5-BUTTERFLY, DOB-5-hemiFLY, 2C-B-FLY, 2C-B-DragonFLY, and 2CBFly-NBOMe, among others.

== History ==
Bromo-DragonFLY was first synthesized by David E. Nichols and colleagues in 1998. As with the earlier and less potent dihydrofuran series of compounds nicknamed FLY, Bromo-DragonFLY was named after its superficial structural resemblance to a dragonfly.

== Society and culture ==
=== Legal status ===
Internationally, Bromo-DragonFLY is an unscheduled drug because it has not been entered into the Convention on Psychotropic substances of 1971. However, it still could still be controlled under analogue laws in some countries, or for the sale of toxic substances for human consumption.

==== Australia ====
As of 9 September 2011, Bromo-DragonFLY was added to Schedule 2 of the Queensland Drugs Misuse Regulation 1987.

Nationally, the drug is listed under Schedule 9 (Prohibited) of the Poisons Standard. Accordingly, the drug is prohibited in all states and territories.

==== Canada ====
As of Oct 12, 2016, Bromo-DragonFLY is listed in Schedule III of the Canadian Controlled Drugs and Substances Act: "2C-phenethylamines and their salts, derivatives, isomers and salts of derivatives and isomers", a broad definition which corresponds to anything with a 2,5-dimethoxyphenethylamine core, including (but not limited to) the 2C family (including e.g. βk-2C-B), the DOx chemical class, the TMA family, aleph (DOT), NBOMe, the 25x-NBx series, and bromo-DragonFLY itself.

==== Denmark ====
On December 3, 2007, the drug was banned in Denmark. The substance has been declared illegal by health minister Jakob Axel Nielsen, following recommendations from the Danish Health Ministry. It is currently classified as a dangerous narcotic and therefore its possession, manufacture, importation, supply or usage is strictly prohibited. Anyone involved in such activities can face legal action.

==== Finland ====
As of 12 March 2012, Bromo-DragonFLY is an illegal designer drug.

==== Norway ====
Bromo-DragonFLY is currently on the Norwegian narcotics list.

==== Poland ====
Currently, Bromo-DragonFLY is an uncontrolled substance in Poland.

==== Romania ====
The chemical compound has been added as an illegal substance under the Law 143/2000 on February 10, 2010.

==== Sweden ====
Sveriges riksdag added Bromo-Dragonfly to schedule IV ("substances, plant materials and fungi that hasn't any or without nothing medical use") as narcotics in Sweden as of Jan 3, 2008, published by Medical Products Agency in their regulation LVFS 2007:14 listed as Bromo-Dragonfly, brombensodifuranyl-isopropylamin. Bromo-DragonFLY was first classified as "health hazard" by Sveriges riksdags health ministry Statens folkhälsoinstitut under the act Lagen om förbud mot vissa hälsofarliga varor (translated Act on the Prohibition of Certain Goods Dangerous to Health) as of Jul 15, 2007, in their regulation SFS 2007:600 listed as brombensodifuranylisopropylamin (Bromo-Dragonfly), making it illegal to sell, purchase, buy, retail or possess.

==== United Kingdom ====
Bromo-DragonFLY is widely reported by the media as being a Class A drug. However, as of 2014, it remains unclear to what extent it is covered by the UK phenylethylamine catch-all clause, with commentators noting both the structural similarities and differences to the phenylethylamine class. If the prosecution could demonstrate structural similarity in court, it would be considered a Class A substance but as a benzodifuran it is significantly different to this class. It is not explicitly named in the misuse of drugs act. It would be covered by the UK Psychoactive Substances Act 2016 but only if it is sold or traded for human consumption.

==== United States ====
Bromo-DragonFLY is unscheduled at federal level in the United States, but could possibly be prosecuted under the Federal Analogue Act if it is sold for human consumption due to its similarities with 2C-B and DOB. Bromo-DragonFLY is listed as a Schedule I substance in Oklahoma.

== See also ==
- FLY (psychedelics)
