= DOB-FLY =

Psychedelic drug

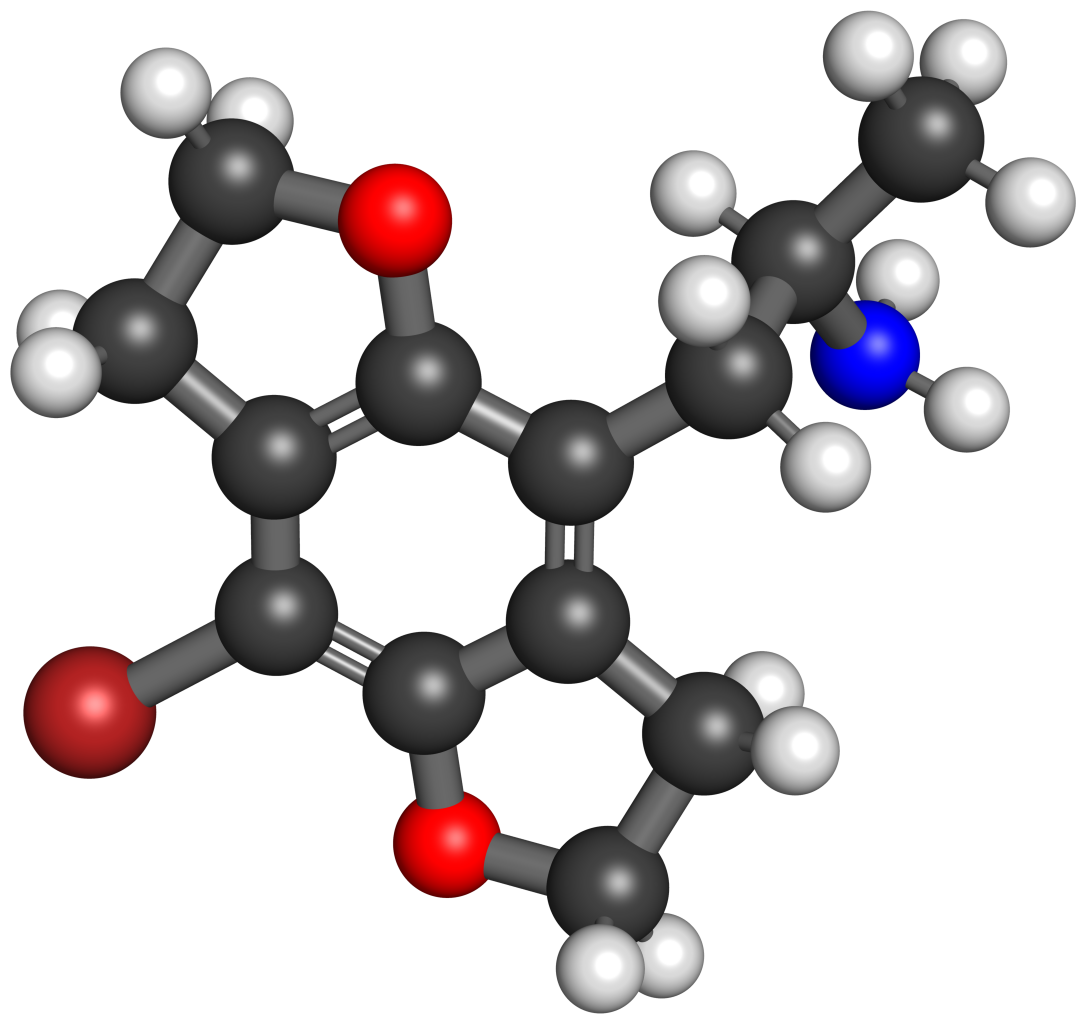

Clinical data
- Other names: 3C-B-FLY; B-FLY; Bromo-FLY
- Routes of administration: Oral
- Drug class: Serotonergic psychedelic; Hallucinogen

Legal status
- Legal status: In general unscheduled

Identifiers
- IUPAC name: 1-(4-bromo-2,3,6,7-tetrahydrofuro[2,3-f][1]benzofuran-8-yl)propan-2-amine
- CAS Number: 219986-75-1
- PubChem CID: 10017554
- ChemSpider: 8193127
- UNII: 7FBG8DMS2E
- ChEMBL: ChEMBL101008
- CompTox Dashboard (EPA): DTXSID80434288

Chemical and physical data
- Formula: C_{13}H_{16}BrNO_{2}
- Molar mass: 298.180 g·mol^{−1}
- 3D model (JSmol): Interactive image
- SMILES: CC(CC1=C2CCOC2=C(C3=C1OCC3)Br)N
- InChI: InChI=1S/C13H16BrNO2/c1-7(15)6-10-8-2-4-17-13(8)11(14)9-3-5-16-12(9)10/h7H,2-6,15H2,1H3; Key:FKRREVSELFOLDT-UHFFFAOYSA-N

DOB-FLY, also known as 3C-B-FLY or as B-FLY, is a psychedelic drug and designer drug of the phenethylamine, amphetamine, DOx, and FLY families. It is the FLY derivative of DOB, the amphetamine (α-methyl) derivative of 2C-B-FLY, and the partially saturated analogue of Bromo-DragonFLY (DOB-DFLY).

Unlike Bromo-DragonFLY, DOB-FLY is only slightly more potent than DOB itself, with an active dose in humans of around 1 mg orally (compared to 1–3 mg orally for DOB).

Analogues of DOB-FLY include DOB, 2C-B-FLY, Bromo-DragonFLY (DOB-DFLY), TFMFly (TFM-FLY), and DOB-5-hemiFLY, among others.

DOB-FLY was developed by David E. Nichols and colleagues at Purdue University. It is a controlled substance in Canada under phenethylamine blanket-ban language, but is not explicitly controlled in the United States.

== See also ==
- FLY (psychedelics)
