= 2C-B-FLY =

Psychedelic drug

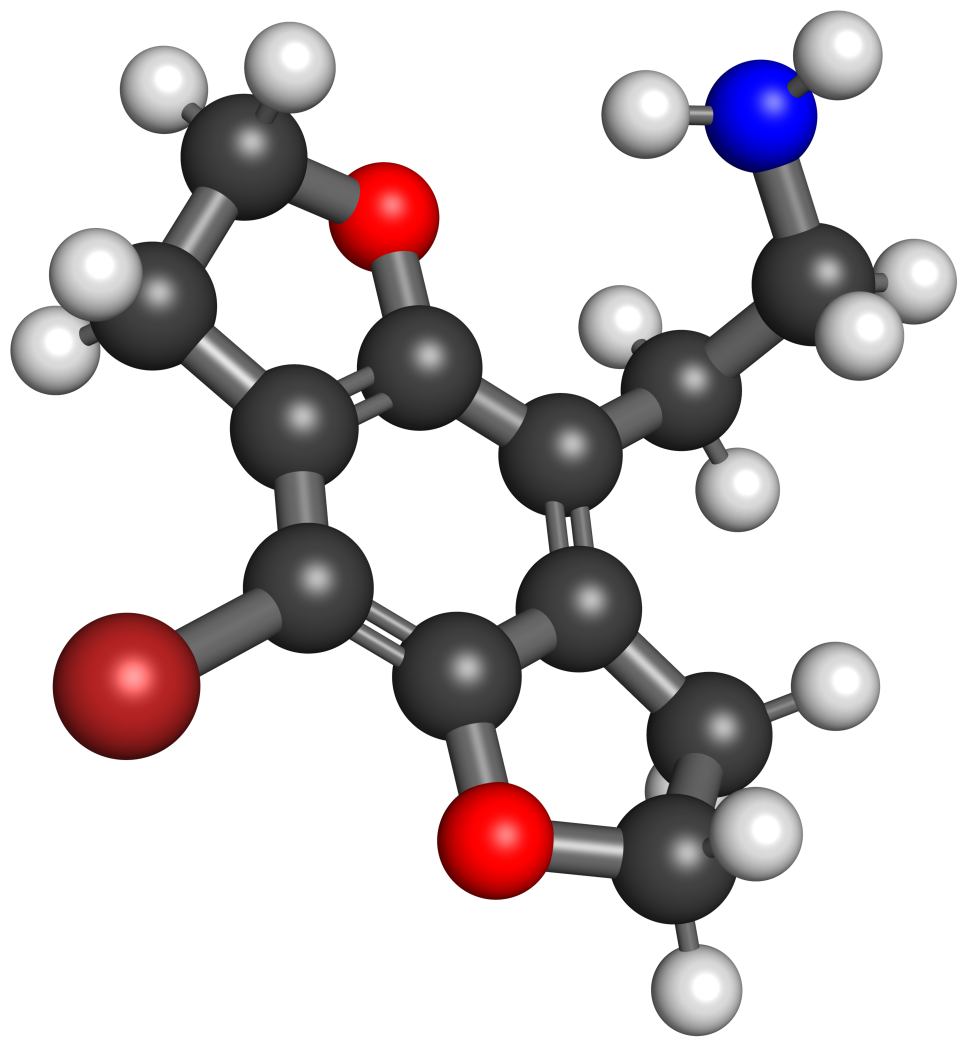

Clinical data
- Routes of administration: Oral
- Drug class: Serotonin 5-HT_{2} receptor agonist; Serotonin 5-HT_{2A} receptor agonist; Serotonergic psychedelic; Hallucinogen

Legal status
- Legal status: DE: NpSG (Industrial and scientific use only); UK: Under Psychoactive Substances Act

Pharmacokinetic data
- Duration of action: 6–10 hours (but up to 20 hours)

Identifiers
- IUPAC name: 2-(4-bromo-2,3,6,7-tetrahydrofuro[2,3-f][1]benzofuran-8-yl)ethanamine
- CAS Number: 733720-95-1
- PubChem CID: 10265873
- ChemSpider: 8441352
- UNII: Z1T18Z40OT
- ChEMBL: ChEMBL101189
- CompTox Dashboard (EPA): DTXSID301342541 DTXSID00170510, DTXSID301342541

Chemical and physical data
- Formula: C_{12}H_{14}BrNO_{2}
- Molar mass: 284.153 g·mol^{−1}
- 3D model (JSmol): Interactive image
- Melting point: 310 °C (590 °F)
- SMILES: NCCc1c2CCOc2c(Br)c3CCOc13
- InChI: InChI=1S/C12H14BrNO2/c13-10-9-3-6-15-11(9)7(1-4-14)8-2-5-16-12(8)10/h1-6,14H2; Key:YZDFADGMVOSVIX-UHFFFAOYSA-N

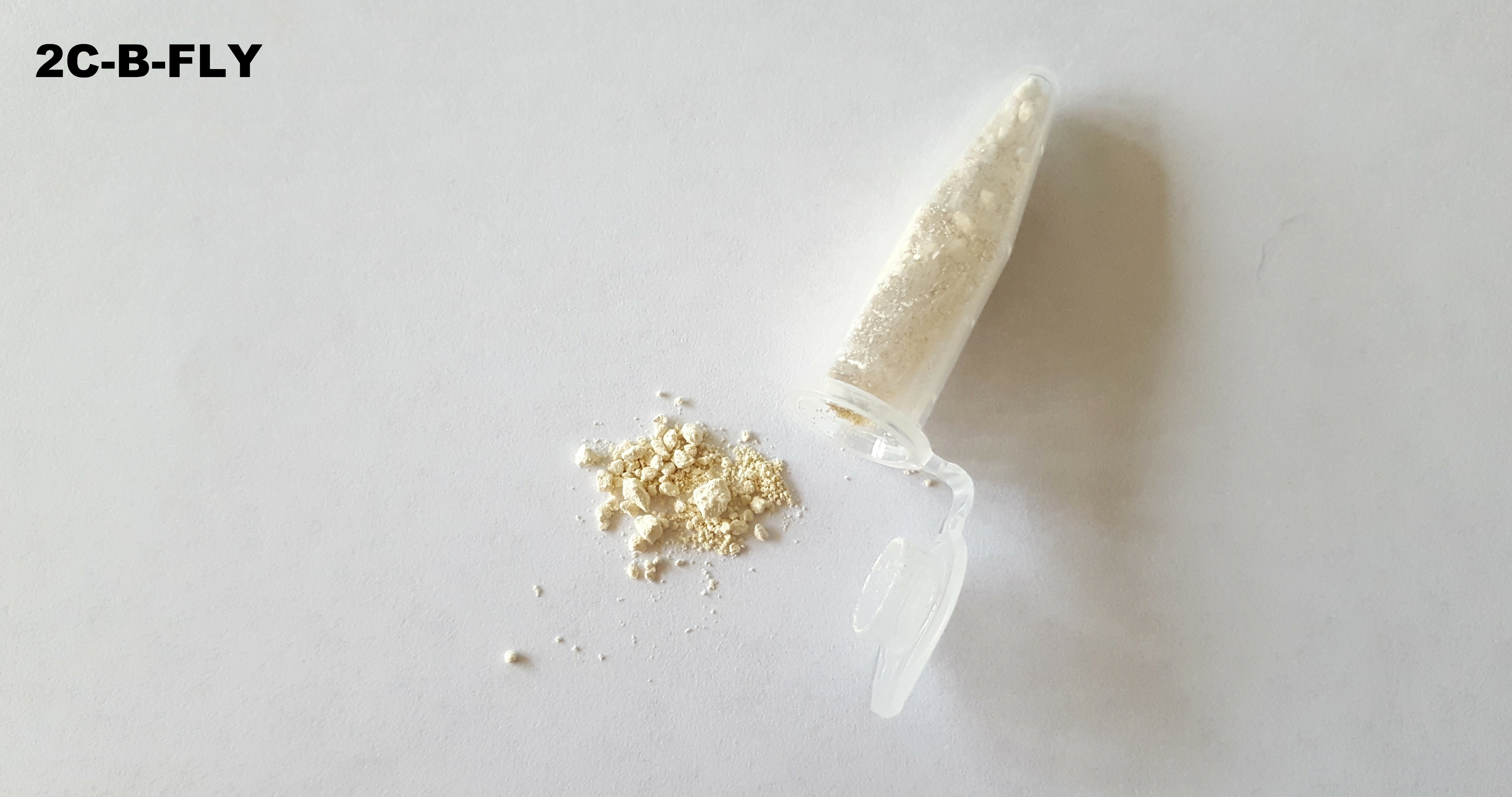
2C-B-Fly in powder form

2C-B-FLY is a psychedelic and designer drug of the phenethylamine, 2C, and FLY families. It was first described in 1995 by Aaron Monte, Professor of Chemistry at UW-La Crosse.

== Use and effects ==
2C-B-FLY was not included nor mentioned in Alexander Shulgin's 1991 book PiHKAL (Phenethylamines I Have Known and Loved). In his subsequent 2011 book The Shulgin Index, Volume One: Psychedelic Phenethylamines and Related Compounds however, he listed 2C-B-FLY's dose as 2.5 to 10 mg orally. On the other hand, other sources give 2C-B-FLY's typical dose range as 10 to 20 mg orally. The duration of 2C-B-FLY is said to be 6 to 10 hours but up to 20 hours. The effects of 2C-B-FLY have been reported to include euphoria, enhanced interpersonal communication, improved mood, closed- and open-eye visuals such as brightening of colors and visual hallucinations, feelings of insight, stimulation, tactile enhancement, sexual enhancement, and altered time perception. Other reported effects include pupil dilation, muscle twitching, restlessness, tachycardia, and body temperature changes.

== Toxicity ==
The toxicity of 2C-B-FLY in humans is unknown. Two deaths occurred in October 2009, in Denmark and the United States, after ingestion of a substance that was sold as 2C-B-FLY in a small-time RC shop, but in fact consisted of Bromo-DragonFLY contaminated with a small amount of unidentified impurities.

== Pharmacology ==
=== Pharmacodynamics ===
2C-B-FLY activities
Target	Affinity (K_{i}, nM)
5-HT_{1A}	147–350
5-HT_{1B}	185
5-HT_{1D}	1.4
5-HT_{1E}	110
5-HT_{1F}	ND
5-HT_{2A}	11–11.6 (K_{i}); 0.029–53.7 (EC_{50}); 80–104% (E_{max})
5-HT_{2B}	0.9 (K_{i}); 0.123–40 (EC_{50}); 56–108% (E_{max})
5-HT_{2C}	10.6–12 (K_{i}); 0.0615–0.149 (EC_{50}); 100–108% (E_{max})
5-HT_{3}	>10,000
5-HT_{4}	ND
5-HT_{5A}	>10,000
5-HT_{6}	150
5-HT_{7}	606
α_{1A}	11,000
α_{1B}	>10,000
α_{1D}	ND
α_{2A}	145–780
α_{2B}	624
α_{2C}	233
β_{1}	>10,000
β_{2}	>10,000
β_{3}	ND
D_{1}	1,400–4,963
D_{2}	1,900–6,835
D_{3}	6,800
D_{4}	>10,000
D_{5}	>10,000
H_{1}	3,400–5,753
H_{2}–H_{4}	>10,000
M_{1}	643
M_{2}	2,029
M_{3}	339
M_{4}	520
M_{5}	873
I_{1}	>10,000
σ_{1}	>10,000
σ_{2}	>10,000
TAAR1	710 (K_{i}) (mouse); 30 (K_{i}) (rat); 1,800 (EC_{50}) (mouse); 270 (EC_{50}) (rat) >30,000 (EC_{50}) (human); 49% (E_{max}) (mouse); 48% (E_{max}) (rat)
SERT	10,000 (K_{i}); 73,000 (IC_{50}) (EC_{50})
NET	17,000 (K_{i}); 97,000 (IC_{50}) (EC_{50})
DAT	>26,000 (K_{i}); 187,000 (IC_{50}) (EC_{50})
MAO-A	19,000 (IC_{50})
MAO-B	ND (IC_{50})
Notes: The smaller the value, the more avidly the drug binds to the site. All proteins are human unless otherwise specified. Refs:

2C-B-FLY is a potent agonist of the serotonin 5-HT_{2} receptors, including the serotonin 5-HT_{2A}, serotonin 5-HT_{2B}, and serotonin 5-HT_{2C} receptors. Unusually among 2C drugs, 2C-B-FLY also shows high affinity for the serotonin 5-HT_{1D} receptor. It also has relatively weak affinity for the serotonin 5-HT_{1A}, 5-HT_{1B}, and 5-HT_{1E} receptors. The drug shows biased agonism at the serotonin 5-HT_{2C} receptor.

== Chemistry ==
2C-B-FLY is 8-bromo-2,3,6,7-benzo-dihydro-difuran-ethylamine. The full name of the chemical is 2-(8-bromo-2,3,6,7-tetrahydrofuro[2,3-f] [1]benzofuran-4-yl)ethanamine. It has been subject of little formal study, but its appearance as a designer drug has led the DEA to release analytical results for 2C-B-FLY and several related compounds.

=== Analogues and derivatives ===
Analogues of 2C-B-FLY include 2C-B, DOB-FLY, and Bromo-DragonFLY (DOB-DFLY), among others.

In theory, dihydro-difuran analogs of any of the 2Cx / DOx family of drugs could be made, and would be expected to show similar activity to the parent compounds, 2-CB, DOB, DOM, etc. In the same way that 2C-B-FLY is the dihydro-difuran analog of 2C-B, the 8-iodo equivalent, "2C-I-FLY," would be the dihydro-difuran analogue of 2C-I, and the 8-methyl equivalent, "2C-D-FLY," would be the dihydro-difuran analogue of 2C-D.

Other related compounds can also be imagined and produced in which the alpha carbon of the ethylamine sidechain is methylated, giving the amphetamine derivative DOB-FLY, with this compound being the dihydro-difuran analogue of DOB, which can be viewed as the fully unsaturated derivative of Bromo-DragonFLY.

When only one methoxy group of a 2Cx drug is cyclized into a dihydro-furan ring, the resulting compound is known as a "hemifly", (and these could be termed 2- or 5- "hemis," depending on where the single dihydro-furan ring is placed). And when an unsaturated furan ring is inserted, the compound is known as a "hemi-dragonfly". The larger, fully saturated, hexahydro-benzo-dipyran ring derivative has been referred to as "2C-B-MOTH." The 8-bromo group can also be replaced by other groups to produce compounds such as TFMFly.

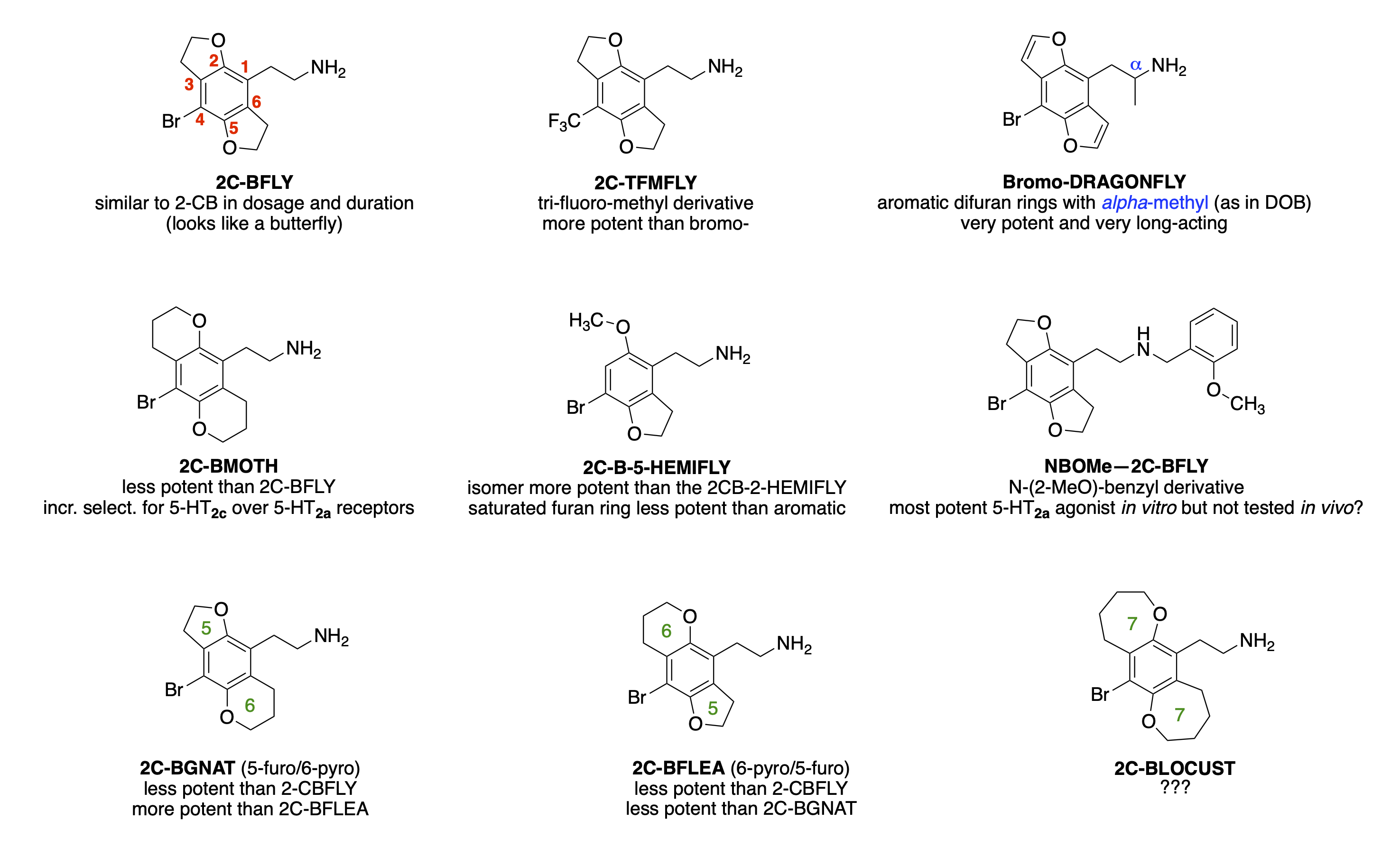
2C-B-FLY and some selected analogues (SAR).

A large number of symmetrical and asymmetrical derivatives can be produced by using different combinations of ring systems. Because the 2- and 5- positions (using the common phenylethylamine numbering scheme), the 2- and 5-positions of the benzene ring, if named as benzo-difurans are not equivalent. Asymmetrical combinations have two possible positional isomers, with different pharmacological activities, at the various 5-HT_{2} subtypes. These compounds were casually referred to as the "2C-B-GNAT," and "2C-B-FLEA" compounds, which contain 5 or 6 membered rings at the 2- vs. 5-positions, respectively. Isomeric "Ψ"-derivatives with the oxygens positioned at the 2,6- positions, and mescaline analogues with the oxygens at 3,5- have also been made, but both are less potent than the corresponding 2,5- isomers. The symmetrical aromatic benzodifuran derivatives tend to have the highest binding affinity at 5-HT_{2A}, but the saturated benzodifuran derivatives have higher efficacy, while the saturated benzodipyran derivatives are more selective for 5-HT_{2C}. A large number of possible combinations have been synthesised and tested for activity, but these represent only a fraction of the many variations that could be produced.

== History ==
2C-B-FLY was first described in the scientific literature by Aaron Phillip Monte and David E. Nichols and colleagues at Purdue University in 1995. Following its discovery, Alexander Shulgin evaluated 2C-B-FLY. It was Ann Shulgin's favorite psychedelic drug and she found it particularly enjoyable in terms of enhanced eroticism.

== Society and culture ==
=== Legal status ===
==== Canada ====
As of October 31, 2016; 2C-B-FLY is a controlled substance (Schedule III) in Canada.

==== Finland ====
Scheduled in the "government decree on psychoactive substances banned from the consumer market".

==== United States ====
2C-B-FLY is unscheduled and uncontrolled in the United States. However, it may fall under the scope of the Federal Analog Act if it is intended for human consumption given its similarity to 2C-B.

== See also ==
- FLY (psychedelics)
