= N-Methylmescaline =

Chemical compound

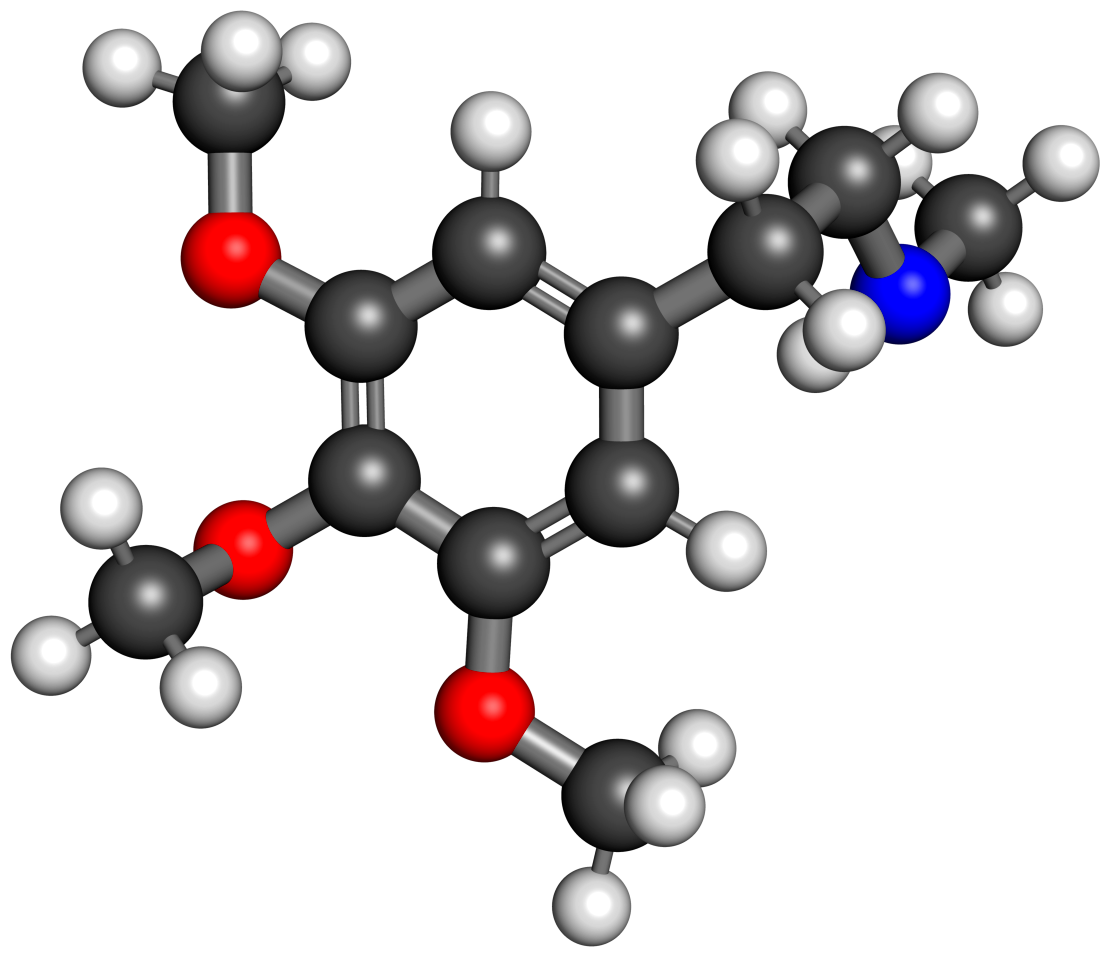

Clinical data
- Other names: NMM; Methylmescaline; M-M; N-Methyl-3,4,5-trimethoxyphenethylamine
- Drug class: Serotonin receptor modulator and possible serotonergic psychedelic or hallucinogen

Identifiers
- IUPAC name: N-methyl-2-(3,4,5-trimethoxyphenyl)ethan-1-amine
- CAS Number: 4838-96-4
- PubChem CID: 138365
- ChemSpider: 121990
- UNII: LNN57P8WGG
- KEGG: C08310
- ChEBI: CHEBI:7319
- ChEMBL: ChEMBL100531
- CompTox Dashboard (EPA): DTXSID00197505
- ECHA InfoCard: 100.161.443

Chemical and physical data
- Formula: C_{12}H_{19}NO_{3}
- Molar mass: 225.288 g·mol^{−1}
- 3D model (JSmol): Interactive image
- SMILES: CNCCC1=CC(=C(C(=C1)OC)OC)OC
- InChI: InChI=1S/C12H19NO3/c1-13-6-5-9-7-10(14-2)12(16-4)11(8-9)15-3/h7-8,13H,5-6H2,1-4H3; Key:OTXANOLOOUNVSR-UHFFFAOYSA-N

N-Methylmescaline (NMM), also known as methylmescaline (M-M), is a serotonin receptor modulator of the phenethylamine alkaloid family related to mescaline that occurs naturally in the cacti species Lophophora williamsii, Pelecyphora aselliformis, and Pachycereus pringlei, among others.

== Use and effects ==
According to chemist Alexander Shulgin, N-methylmescaline shows no central or peripheral effects at doses of ~25 milligrams, which is many times the minor or trace amounts present in peyote. Nonetheless, according to Shulgin, N-methylmescaline, in combination with potent isoquinoline monoamine oxidase inhibitors (MAOIs) that are also present in the cactus, might be the active psychedelic constituent of Pachycereus pringlei, which notably does not contain mescaline.

== Pharmacology ==
=== Pharmacodynamics ===
N-Methylmescaline shows weak affinity for serotonin receptors similarly to mescaline. It was found to have about half the serotonin receptor affinity of mescaline (A_{2} = 5,250 nM vs. 2,240 nM, respectively).

N-Methylmescaline failed to significantly substitute for mescaline (25 mg/kg) in rodent drug discrimination tests either with intraperitoneal or intracerebroventricular injection. In contrast to N-methylmescaline however, trichocereine (N,N-dimethylmescaline) produced similar effects to mescaline at a dose of 50 mg/kg intraperitoneally, whereas it only transiently substituted for mescaline when given intracerebroventricularly. Trichocereine has also been reported to be psychedelic in humans, although findings in this area are controversial and conflicting. It has been noted that N-methylation of psychedelic phenethylamines, for instance Beatrice (N-methyl-DOM), has invariably eliminated their hallucinogenic activity.

N-Methylmescaline is less toxic than mescaline in terms of raw LD50.

== Chemistry ==
N-Methylmescaline, also known as N-methyl-3,4,5-trimethoxyphenethylamine, is a substituted phenethylamine and scaline. It is specifically the N-methyl analogue of mescaline (3,4,5-trimethoxyphenethylamine).

=== Synthesis ===
The chemical synthesis of N-methylmescaline has been described.

=== Analogues ===
Analogues of N-methylmescaline, besides mescaline, include trichocereine (N,N-dimethylmescaline), N-acetylmescaline, N-formylmescaline, and N,N-diformylmescaline, among others. Other psychedelic-related N-methylphenethylamines include methyl-TMA (N-methyl-TMA), Beatrice (N-methyl-DOM), N-methyl-DOET, N-methyl-DOB, N-methyl-2C-I, N-methyl-DMA, N-methyl-MMDA-2, and MDMA (N-methyl-MDA).

== History ==
N-Methylmescaline was first described in the scientific literature by Ernst Späth and Johann Bruck in 1937. It was isolated from Lophophora williamsii (peyote) by the researchers and was also synthesized.

== Society and culture ==
=== Legal status ===
==== Canada ====
N-Methylmescaline is not a controlled substance in Canada as of 2025.

==== United States ====
N-Methylmescaline is not an explicitly controlled substance in the United States. However, it may be considered controlled in this country as it is a positional isomer of 3,4,5-trimethoxyamphetamine (TMA), which is a specifically regulated substance.

== See also ==
- Scaline
- Pachycereus pringlei § Constituents and effects
