= N-Methyl-DOET =

Clinical data
- Other names: METHYL-DOET; DOETM; 4-Ethyl-2,5-dimethoxy-N-methylamphetamine; 2,5-Dimethoxy-4-ethyl-N-methylamphetamine; 4-Ethyl-2,5-dimethoxymethamphetamine
- Routes of administration: Oral
- Drug class: Serotonergic psychedelic; Hallucinogen
- ATC code: None

Identifiers
- IUPAC name: 1-(4-ethyl-2,5-dimethoxyphenyl)-N-methylpropan-2-amine

Chemical and physical data
- Formula: C_{14}H_{23}NO_{2}
- Molar mass: 237.343 g·mol^{−1}
- 3D model (JSmol): Interactive image
- SMILES: CNC(Cc1cc(OC)c(cc1OC)CC)C
- InChI: InChI=1S/C14H23NO2/c1-6-11-8-14(17-5)12(7-10(2)15-3)9-13(11)16-4/h8-10,15H,6-7H2,1-5H3; Key:RQQHOPRRBXCSOF-UHFFFAOYSA-N

N-Methyl-DOET, also known as DOETM, as well as 4-ethyl-2,5-dimethoxy-N-methylamphetamine, is a psychedelic drug of the phenethylamine, amphetamine, and DOx families. It is the N-methyl derivative of the serotonergic psychedelic 4-ethyl-2,5-dimethoxyamphetamine (DOET).

== Use and effects ==
N-Methyl-DOET is said to be significantly active at a dose of 18 mg orally and to have a duration of 8 to 10 hours in humans. However, it appears to be several times less potent than DOET, which is active at doses of 2 to 6 mg orally with a duration of 14 to 20 hours. The effects of N-methyl-DOET were not specifically described but were said to be calmer and more pleasant compared to those of DOET.

== Chemistry ==
=== Analogues ===
N-Methylation of psychedelic phenethylamines has invariably greatly reduced or eliminated their hallucinogenic activity. Examples of this include related compounds like Beatrice (N-methyl-DOM) and methyl-DOB (N-methyl-DOB), which at assessed doses appear to be inactive as psychedelics in humans. However, N-methyl-DOET, though much less potent than DOET, is an apparent exception to this rule, in that it has been found to be clearly psychedelic and to retain decent potency.

== History ==
N-Methyl-DOET was first described in the scientific literature by Daniel Trachsel in 2013. It was synthesized and evaluated by P. Rausch, who provided the information on its properties and effects to Trachsel via personal communication.

== Society and culture ==
=== Legal status ===
==== Canada ====
N-Methyl-DOET is a controlled substance in Canada under phenethylamine blanket-ban language.

== See also ==
- DOx (psychedelics)
- Beatrice (N-methyl-DOM)
- N-Methyl-TMA-2
- N-Methyl-DOI
- Methyl-DOB (N-methyl-DOB)
- N-Methyl-2C-B
- N-Methyl-2C-I
- IDNNA (N,N-dimethyl-DOI)
- Methyl-TMA (N-methyl-TMA)
- N-Methylmescaline
- Trichocereine
- Ariadne
