= C12H18BrNO2 =

The molecular formula C_{12}H_{18}BrNO_{2} (molar mass: 288.18 g/mol, exact mass: 287.0521 u) may refer to:

- Methyl-DOB, or 4-bromo-2,5-dimethoxy-N-methylamphetamine
- N-Ethyl-2C-B
- 2CB-2,5-DiEtO
