= Methyl-TMA-2 =

Clinical data
- Other names: METHYL-TMA-2; N-Me-TMA-2; N-Methyl-TMA-2; α,N-Dimethyl-2C-O; N-Methyl-2,4,5-trimethoxyamphetamine
- ATC code: None

Identifiers
- IUPAC name: N-methyl-1-(2,4,5-trimethoxyphenyl)propan-2-amine
- CAS Number: 93675-32-2
- PubChem CID: 69454104

Chemical and physical data
- Formula: C_{13}H_{21}NO_{3}
- Molar mass: 239.315 g·mol^{−1}
- 3D model (JSmol): Interactive image
- SMILES: CC(CC1=CC(=C(C=C1OC)OC)OC)NC
- InChI: InChI=1S/C13H21NO3/c1-9(14-2)6-10-7-12(16-4)13(17-5)8-11(10)15-3/h7-9,14H,6H2,1-5H3; Key:USTLBRBKMWJINX-UHFFFAOYSA-N

Methyl-TMA-2, or N-methyl-TMA-2, also known as N-methyl-2,4,5-trimethoxyamphetamine, is a drug of the phenethylamine, amphetamine, and DOx families. It is the N-methyl derivative of 2,4,5-trimethoxyamphetamine (TMA-2) as well as the α,N-dimethyl derivative of 2C-O (2,4,5-trimethoxyphenethylamine).

== Use and effects ==
N-Methylation of psychedelic phenethylamines has invariably greatly reduced or eliminated their hallucinogenic activity. Examples of this include related compounds like Beatrice (N-methyl-DOM) and methyl-DOB (N-methyl-DOB), which at assessed doses appear to be inactive as psychedelics in humans. In accordance with the preceding findings, per Alexander Shulgin in his book PiHKAL (Phenethylamines I Have Known and Loved), methyl-TMA-2 was inactive at doses of up to 120 mg orally. For comparison, the active dose range of TMA-2 is 20 to 40 mg orally.

== History ==
Methyl-TMA-2 was first described in the scientific literature by at least 1984. It was subsequently described further by Shulgin in PiHKAL in 1991.

== Society and culture ==
=== Legal status ===
==== Canada ====
Methyl-TMA-2 is a controlled substance in Canada under phenethylamine blanket-ban language.

== See also ==
- DOx (psychedelics)
- Methyl-TMA
- Beatrice (N-methyl-DOM)
- N-Methyl-DOET
- N-Methyl-DOB
- Methyl-DMA (N-methyl-2,5-DMA)
- N-Methylmescaline
- Trichocereine (N,N-dimethylmescaline)
- 2,4,5-Trihydroxymethamphetamine (THMA)
