= C12H17NO4 =

The molecular formula C_{12}H_{17}NO_{4} (molar mass : 239.27 g/mol) may refer to:

- Dimethoxymethylenedioxyamphetamine
  - DMMDA-2, 2,3-Dimethoxy-4,5-methylenedioxyamphetamine
  - DMMDA, 2,5-Dimethoxy-3,4-methylenedioxyamphetamine
- N-Formylmescaline
