= Trichocereine =

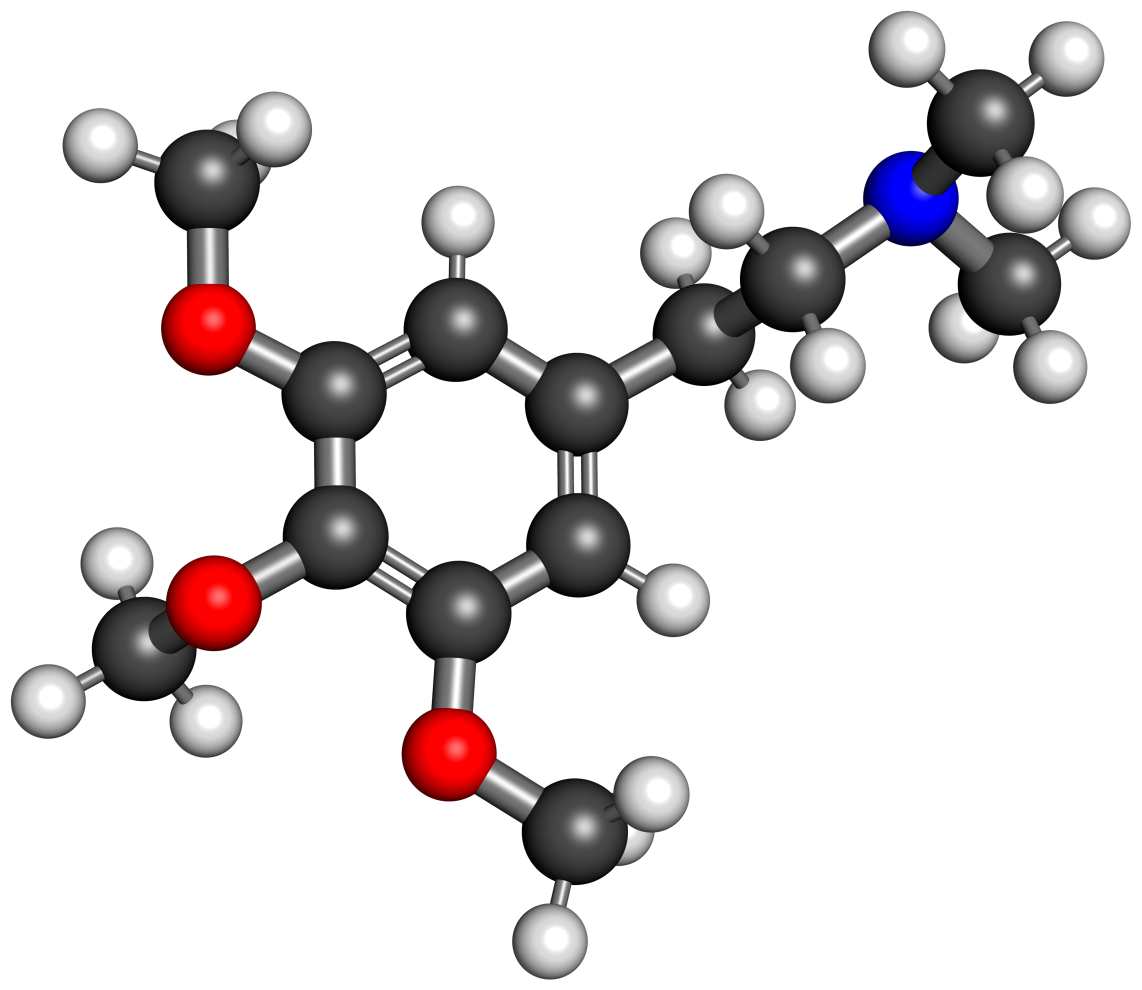

Clinical data
- Other names: N,N-Dimethyl-3,4,5-trimethoxyphenethylamine; N,N-Dimethylmescaline; 3,4,5-Trimethoxy-N,N-dimethylbenzeneethanamine; MM-M
- ATC code: None

Identifiers
- IUPAC name: N,N-dimethyl-2-(3,4,5-trimethoxyphenyl)ethanamine
- CAS Number: 529-91-9
- PubChem CID: 420418
- ChemSpider: 372161
- ChEMBL: ChEMBL2009417
- CompTox Dashboard (EPA): DTXSID90329454

Chemical and physical data
- Formula: C_{13}H_{21}NO_{3}
- Molar mass: 239.315 g·mol^{−1}
- 3D model (JSmol): Interactive image
- SMILES: CN(C)CCC1=CC(=C(C(=C1)OC)OC)OC
- InChI: InChI=1S/C13H21NO3/c1-14(2)7-6-10-8-11(15-3)13(17-5)12(9-10)16-4/h8-9H,6-7H2,1-5H3; Key:BTSKBPJWJZFTPQ-UHFFFAOYSA-N

Trichocereine, or trichocerine, also known as N,N-dimethyl-3,4,5-trimethoxyphenethylamine or as N,N-dimethylmescaline (MM-M), is a phenethylamine alkaloid that is found in several plant species and is closely related to the psychedelic drug mescaline (3,4,5-trimethoxyphenethylamine).

== Use and effects ==
In contrast to mescaline, trichocereine has been found to lack psychoactive effects in humans even at large doses. F. P. Ludueña assessed trichocereine hydrochloride in the mid-1930s and found that it produced no effects, with the exception of slight gastric heaviness, at doses of up 9 mg/kg orally (630 mg for a 70-kg person) and up to 550 mg parenterally.

On the other hand, M. Vojtĕchovský and D. Krus assessed trichocereine in the 1960s at doses of up to 800 mg (presumably orally) and found that it was weaker than 400 mg mescaline. They also tried 400 mg trichocereine sublingually and reported that it produced moderate psychedelic effects with a one-hour onset (compared to two hours for mescaline) and a "proportionally shorter" duration than mescaline or a duration of one hour. According to Alexander Shulgin however, these psychoactive effects were ill-defined and it was felt that they might have been attributable to anxiety.

Shulgin has noted that Trichocereus terscheckii, which contains trichocereine as its major constituent, is commonly consumed in large amounts by humans and animals as a water source without obvious consequences. It has been noted that N-methylation of psychedelic phenethylamines, for instance Beatrice (N-methyl-DOM), has invariably reduced hallucinogenic bioactivity.

== Pharmacology ==
=== Pharmacodynamics ===
Trichocereine showed no activity in the conditioned avoidance test in rodents. It has been reported to substitute for mescaline in rodent drug discrimination tests. Trichocereine at a dose of 50 mg/kg intraperitoneally produced full substitution for mescaline (25 mg/kg) in these tests, whereas it only transiently substituted for mescaline when given intracerebroventricularly. It produces convulsions in cats and causes marked excitation similar to that induced by amphetamine in rodents. Other pharmacological effects of trichocereine have also been described.

== Chemistry ==
=== Synthesis ===
The chemical synthesis of trichocereine has been described.

=== Analogues ===
Analogues of trichocereine (N,N-dimethylmescaline) include mescaline, N-methylmescaline, N-formylmescaline, N,N-diformylmescaline, N-acetylmescaline, mescaloxylic acid, mescaloruvic acid, macromerine (β-hydroxy-N,N-dimethyl-DMPEA), 3-hydroxy-N,N-dimethylphenethylamine (LSM-6), and methyl-TMA (N-methyl-TMA), among others.

== Natural occurrence ==
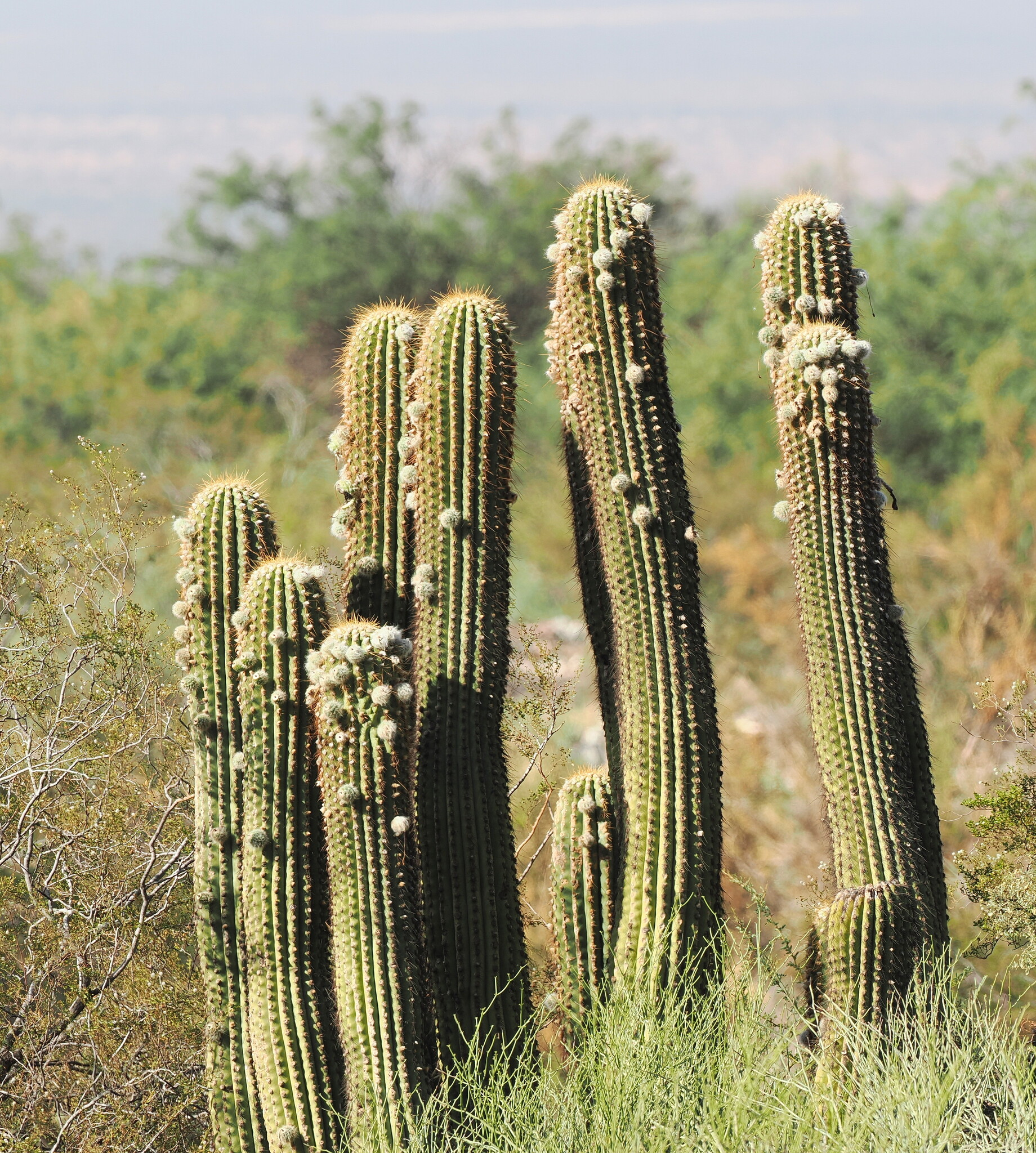
Leucostele terscheckii (Trichocereus terscheckii) cactus, which contains trichocereine.

Trichocereine was first reported in the Trichocereus terscheckii cactus in 1935 and was subsequently isolated from Gymnocalycium spp. and Turbinicarpus spp. cacti. Additionally, it has been found in the shrubs Acacia berlandieri and Acacia rigidula, though these findings are questionable. The compound is the major alkaloid present in Trichocereus terscheckii. It has never been reported in peyote (Lophophora williamsii).

== History ==
Trichocereine was first described in the scientific literature by F. P. Ludueña by 1935.

== Society and culture ==
=== Legal status ===
==== Canada ====
Trichocereine is not a controlled substance in Canada as of 2025.

==== United States ====
Trichocereine is not an explicitly controlled substance in the United States. However, it could be considered a controlled substance under the Federal Analogue Act if intended for human consumption.

== See also ==
- Scaline
