= Methyl-TMA =

Clinical data
- Other names: METHYL-TMA; N-Me-TMA; N-Methyl-TMA; α,N-Dimethylmescaline; N-Methyl-3,4,5-trimethoxyamphetamine
- Routes of administration: Oral
- Drug class: Serotonergic psychedelic; Hallucinogen
- ATC code: None

Identifiers
- IUPAC name: N-methyl-1-(3,4,5-trimethoxyphenyl)propan-2-amine
- CAS Number: 93675-34-4
- PubChem CID: 24257271
- ChemSpider: 23900079

Chemical and physical data
- Formula: C_{13}H_{21}NO_{3}
- Molar mass: 239.315 g·mol^{−1}
- 3D model (JSmol): Interactive image
- SMILES: CC(CC1=CC(=C(C(=C1)OC)OC)OC)NC
- InChI: InChI=1S/C13H21NO3/c1-9(14-2)6-10-7-11(15-3)13(17-5)12(8-10)16-4/h7-9,14H,6H2,1-5H3; Key:XYKHBBWJSFSLRF-UHFFFAOYSA-N

Methyl-TMA, or N-methyl-TMA, also known as N-methyl-3,4,5-trimethoxyamphetamine, is a psychedelic drug of the phenethylamine, amphetamine, and 3C families. It is the N-methyl derivative of 3,4,5-trimethoxyamphetamine (TMA) as well as the α,N-dimethyl derivative of mescaline (3,4,5-trimethoxyphenethylamine).

== Use and effects ==
N-Methylation of psychedelic phenethylamines has invariably greatly reduced or eliminated their hallucinogenic activity. Examples of this include related compounds like Beatrice (N-methyl-DOM) and methyl-DOB (N-methyl-DOB), which at assessed doses appear to be inactive as psychedelics in humans. According to Alexander Shulgin in his book PiHKAL (Phenethylamines I Have Known and Loved) however, methyl-TMA showed "some mental disturbances" at the highest assessed dose of 240 mg orally. For comparison, the active dose range of TMA is 100 to 250 mg orally.

== History ==
Methyl-TMA was first described in the scientific literature by at least 1984. It was subsequently described further by Shulgin in PiHKAL in 1991.

== Society and culture ==
=== Legal status ===
==== Canada ====
Methyl-TMA is a controlled substance in Canada under phenethylamine blanket-ban language.

== See also ==
- 3C (psychedelics)
- N-Methylmescaline
- Trichocereine (N,N-dimethylmescaline)
- Beatrice (N-methyl-DOM)
- N-Methyl-DOET
- N-Methyl-DOB
- N-Methyl-TMA-2
- Methyl-DMA (N-methyl-2,5-DMA)
