= N-Ethyl-2C-B =

Chemical compound

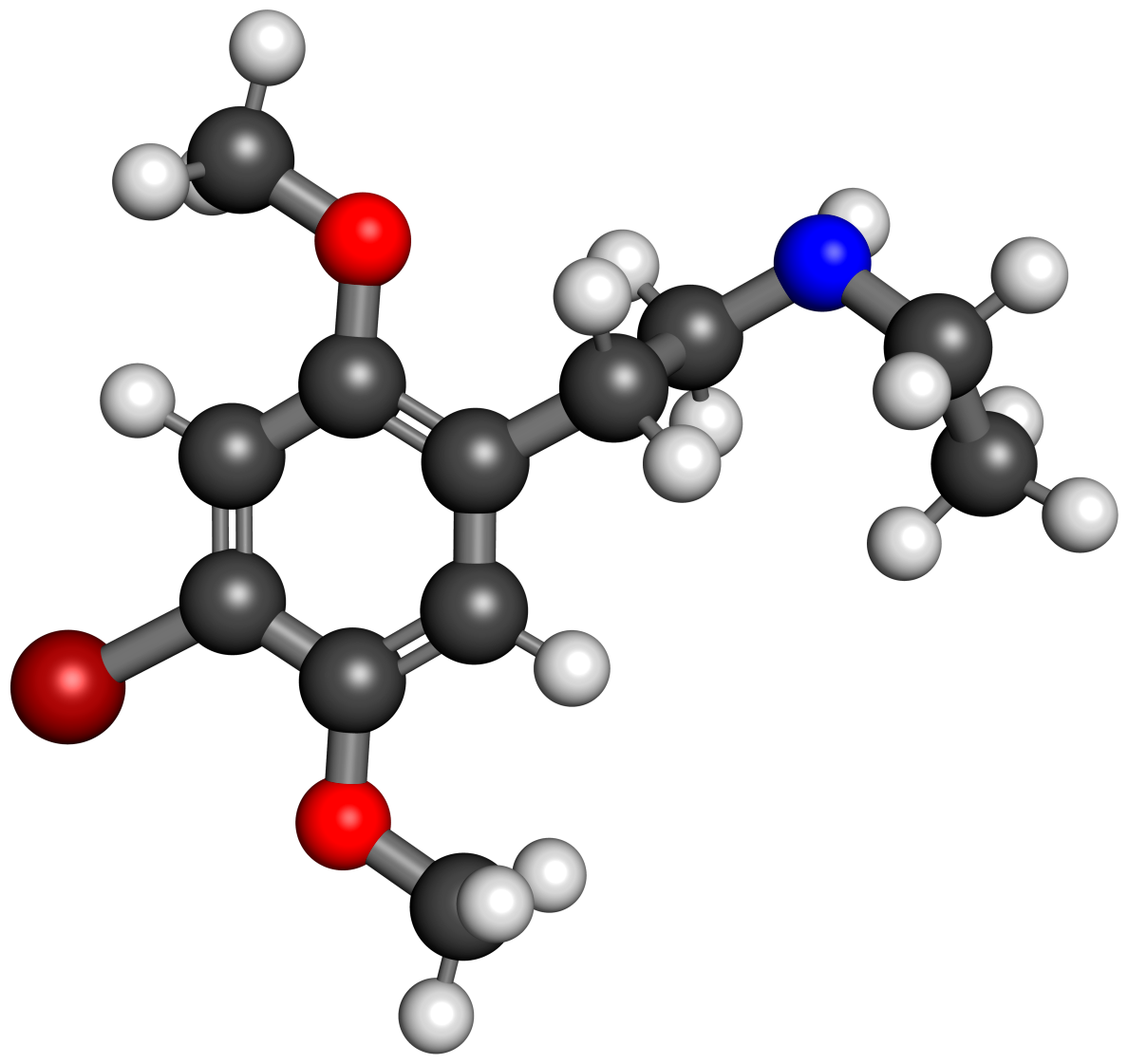

Clinical data
- Other names: 2C-B-E; 2C-BE; 4-Bromo-N-ethyl-2,5-dimethoxyphenethylamine
- Drug class: Serotonin 5-HT_{2A} receptor agonist; Serotonergic psychedelic; Hallucinogen

Legal status
- Legal status: In general unscheduled

Identifiers
- IUPAC name: 2-(4-bromo-2,5-dimethoxyphenyl)-N-ethylethanamine
- CAS Number: 155639-24-0
- PubChem CID: 10379339
- ChemSpider: 8554782
- UNII: JC6CK9H75Z
- ChEMBL: ChEMBL57147
- CompTox Dashboard (EPA): DTXSID601336903

Chemical and physical data
- Formula: C_{12}H_{18}BrNO_{2}
- Molar mass: 288.185 g·mol^{−1}
- 3D model (JSmol): Interactive image
- SMILES: COC1=CC(CCNCC)=C(OC)C=C1Br
- InChI: InChI=1S/C12H18BrNO2/c1-4-14-6-5-9-7-12(16-3)10(13)8-11(9)15-2/h7-8,14H,4-6H2,1-3H3; Key:FTXAZQUDSNEXMB-UHFFFAOYSA-N

N-Ethyl-2C-B, also known as 2C-B-E, is a psychedelic drug of the phenethylamine and 2C families related to 2C-B. It is the N-ethyl derivative of 2C-B.

The drug shows affinity for the serotonin 5-HT_{2A} and 5-HT_{2C} receptors (K_{i} = 40–330 nM and 1,930 nM, respectively). Its affinities for these receptors were 10–40-fold and 54-fold lower than those of 2C-B, respectively. N-Ethyl-2C-B has been reported to be a potent full agonist of the serotonin 5-HT_{2A} receptor, with an EC_{50} of 3.39 nM and an E_{max} of 106% It was 8-fold more potent as a serotonin 5-HT_{2A} receptor agonist in vitro than LSD in the same study.

The chemical synthesis of N-ethyl-2C-B has been described. Analogues of N-ethyl-2C-B include 2C-B, N-methyl-2C-B, N-methyl-2C-I, N-methyl-DOB, N-benzyl-2C-B, and 25B-NBOMe, among others.

N-Ethyl-2C-B was first described in the scientific literature by Richard Glennon and colleagues by 1994. It was encountered as a novel designer drug in Finland in 2007. The drug is a controlled substance in Finland. In addition, it is a controlled substance in Canada under phenethylamine blanket-ban language.

== See also ==
- 2C (psychedelics)
- βk-2C-B
