= IDNNA =

Clinical data
- Other names: 4-Iodo-2,5-dimethoxy-N,N-dimethylamphetamine; 2,5-Dimethoxy-4-iodo-N,N-dimethylamphetamine; N,N-Dimethyl-DOI
- Routes of administration: Oral
- ATC code: None

Pharmacokinetic data
- Duration of action: Unknown

Identifiers
- IUPAC name: 1-(4-iodo-2,5-dimethoxyphenyl)-N,N-dimethylpropan-2-amine
- CAS Number: 85563-10-6
- PubChem CID: 135056
- ChemSpider: 119009
- UNII: M6Q9NK9RFD
- ChEMBL: ChEMBL11043
- CompTox Dashboard (EPA): DTXSID901006121

Chemical and physical data
- Formula: C_{13}H_{20}INO_{2}
- Molar mass: 349.212 g·mol^{−1}
- 3D model (JSmol): Interactive image
- SMILES: Ic1cc(OC)c(cc1OC)CC(N(C)C)C
- InChI: InChI=1S/C13H20INO2/c1-9(15(2)3)6-10-7-13(17-5)11(14)8-12(10)16-4/h7-9H,6H2,1-5H3; Key:XBCUSBRGRALQID-UHFFFAOYSA-N

IDNNA, also known as 4-iodo-2,5-dimethoxy-N,N-dimethylamphetamine or as N,N-dimethyl-DOI, is a chemical compound of the phenethylamine, amphetamine, and DOx families. It is the N,N-dimethyl derivative of the psychedelic drug DOI.

== Use and effects ==
In his book PiHKAL (Phenethylamines I Have Known and Loved), Alexander Shulgin lists IDNNA's dose as greater than 2.6 mg orally and its duration as unknown. IDNNA produced no effects at tested doses. Higher doses were not assessed.

== Chemistry ==
=== Synthesis ===
The chemical synthesis of IDNNA has been described.

=== Analogues ===
Analogues of IDNNA include DOI, N-methyl-DOI, methyl-DOB (N-methyl-DOB), Beatrice (N-methyl-DOM), N-methyl-DOET, N-methyl-2C-I, and N-methyl-2C-B, among others.

== History ==
IDNNA was first described in the scientific literature by Alexander Shulgin and colleagues in 1982. Subsequently, it was described in greater detail by Shulgin in his book PiHKAL (Phenethylamines I Have Known and Loved) in 1991.

== Society and culture ==
=== Legal status ===
==== Canada ====
IDNNA is a controlled substance in Canada under phenethylamine blanket-ban language.

==== United Kingdom ====
This substance is a Class A drug in the Drugs controlled by the UK Misuse of Drugs Act.

== See also ==
- DOx (psychedelics)
