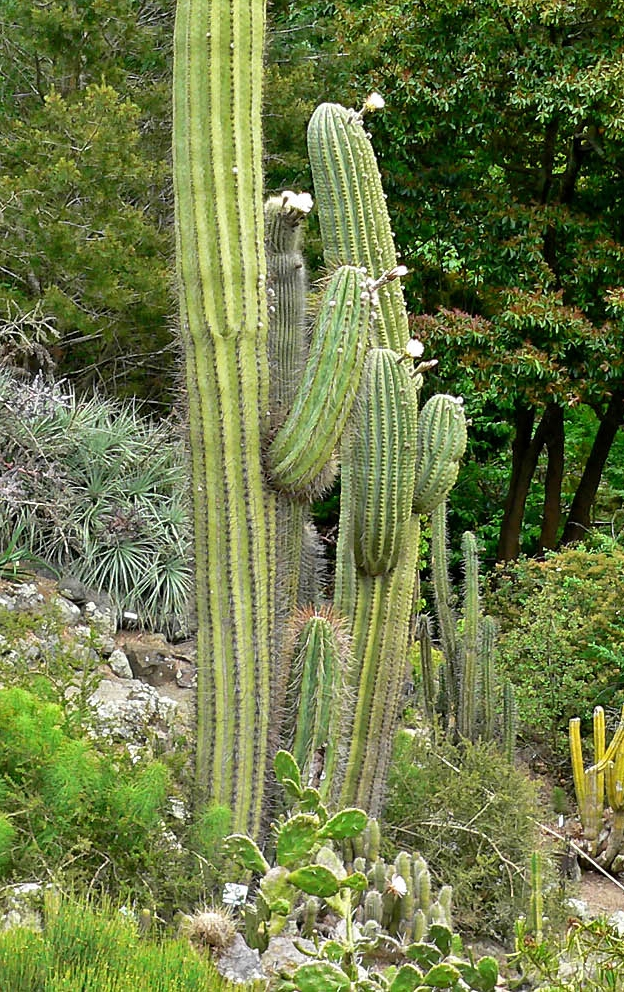

Conservation status
- Vulnerable (IUCN 3.1)

Scientific classification
- Kingdom: Plantae
- Clade: Embryophytes
- Clade: Tracheophytes
- Clade: Spermatophytes
- Clade: Angiosperms
- Clade: Eudicots
- Order: Caryophyllales
- Family: Cactaceae
- Subfamily: Cactoideae
- Genus: Leucostele
- Species: L. terscheckii

Binomial name
- Leucostele terscheckii (J.Parm. ex Pfeiff.) Schlumpb.

Synonyms
- Cereus terscheckii Parm. ex Pfeiff.; Echinopsis terscheckii var. montana (Backeb.) K.Friedrich & G.D.Rowley; Pilocereus terschenckii (Parm. ex Pfeiff.) Rumpler ex Pfeiff.; Trichocereus terscheckii (Parm. ex Pfeiff.) Britton & Rose; Leucostele terscheckii (Parm.) Friedrich & G.D.Rowley

= Leucostele terscheckii =

Species of plant

Leucostele terscheckii, commonly known as the cardon grande cactus or Argentine saguaro, is a large cactus native to South America and popular in cultivation.

== Description ==
It is a columnar, branching cactus that can grow over 7.6 metres (25 ft) tall. Its branches are about 25 cm (9.8 in) in diameter with 8 to 14 ribs. Branches are cylindrical, fleshy, light green. The branches are 10-20 cm in diameter, with 8-14 blunt ribs. It has large brownish areoles about 2.5 cm (0.98 in) apart with 8 to 15 yellowish spines, 8.3–10 cm (3.3–3.9 in) long, a central one, sometimes absent, and 8-15 radial. The nocturnal funnel-shaped white flowers can grow up to 15–20 cm (5.9–7.9 in) long and 13–15 cm (5.1–5.9 in) wide. Pericarp and flower tube with dense white or brown axillary hairs. The round or oblong blue fruits are about 1.3 cm (0.51 in) in diameter and contain black to brown, oval seeds approximately 0.76 mm (0.030 in) long.

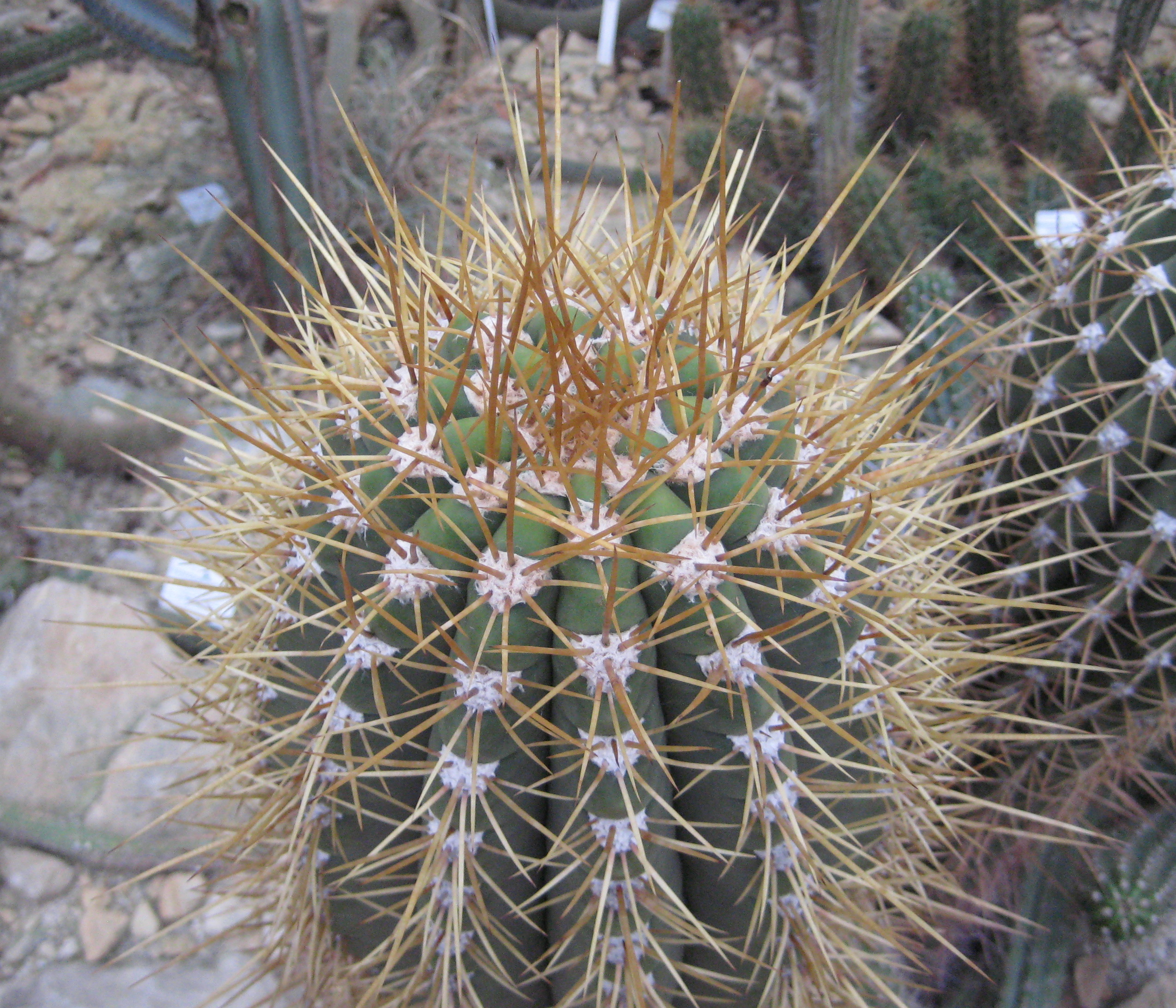
Spines

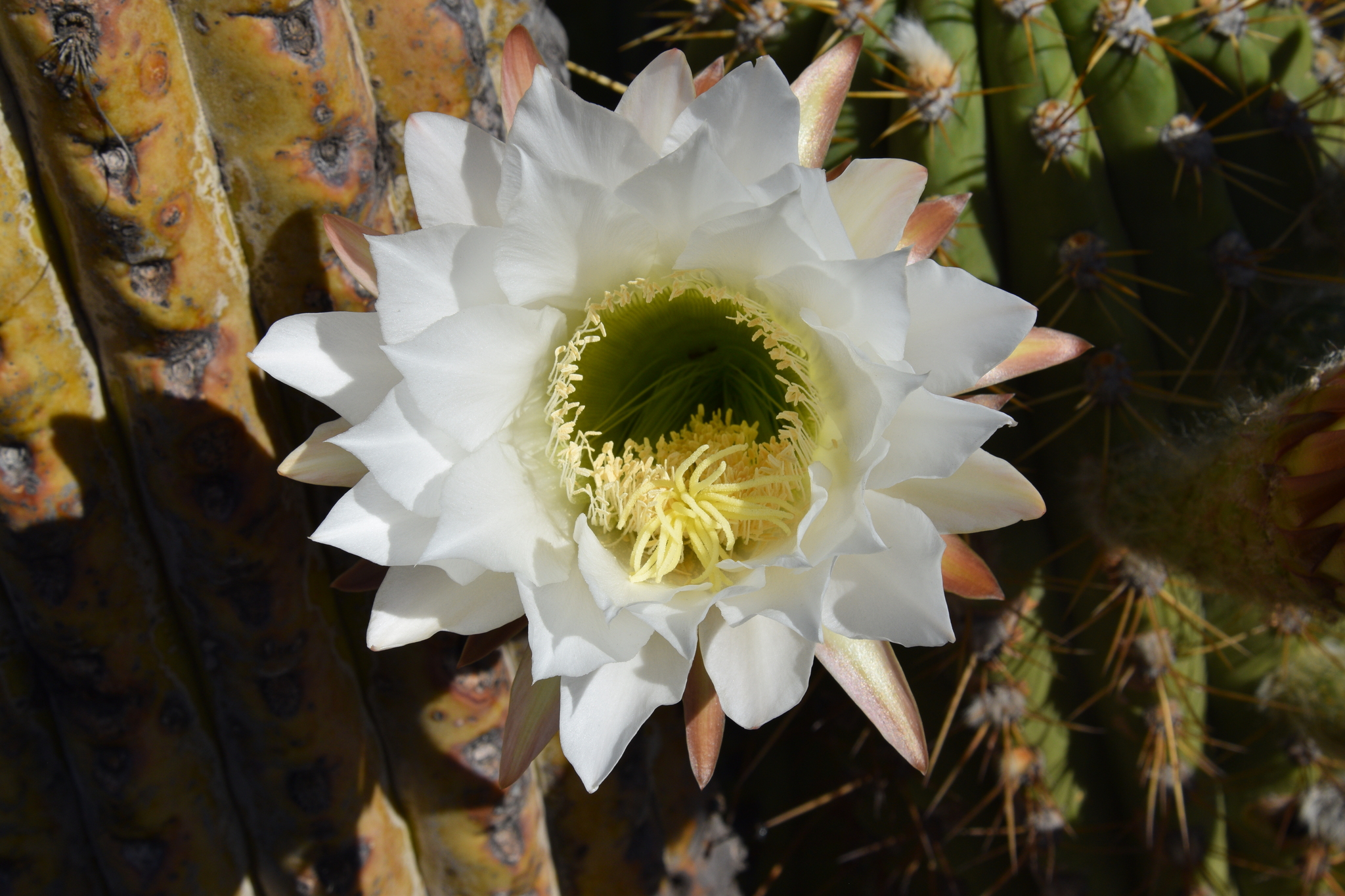
Flowers

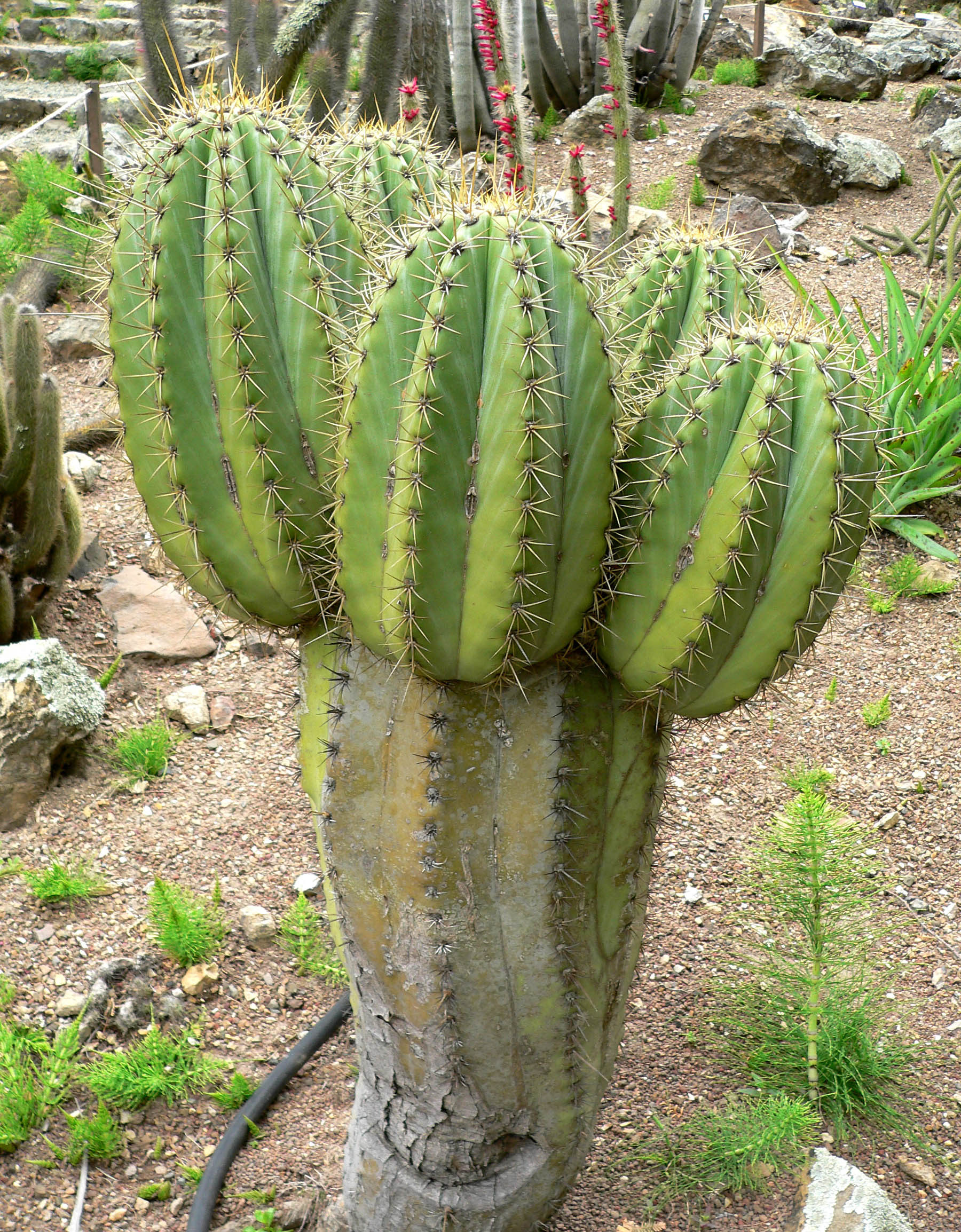
Growth

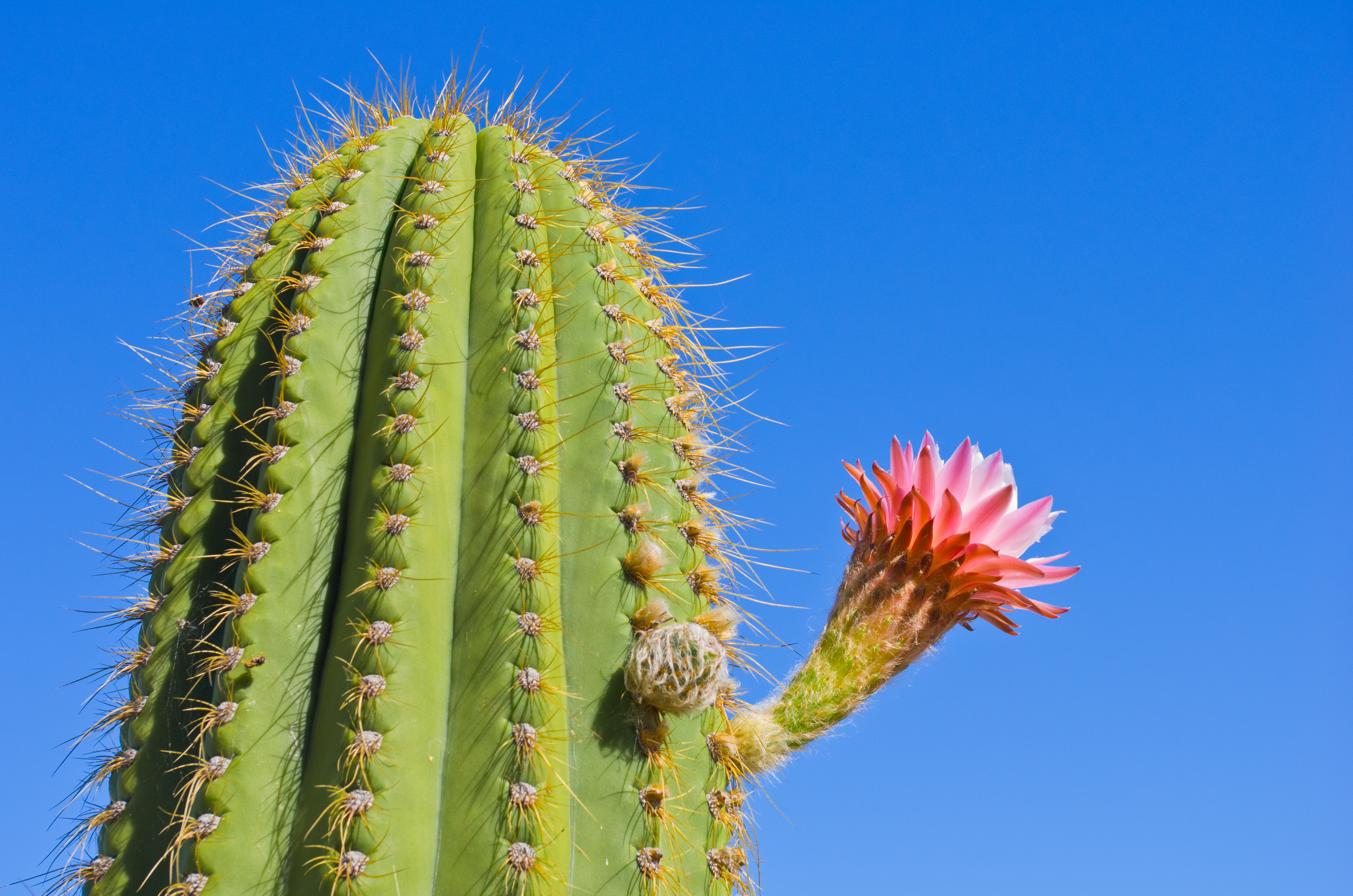
Buds

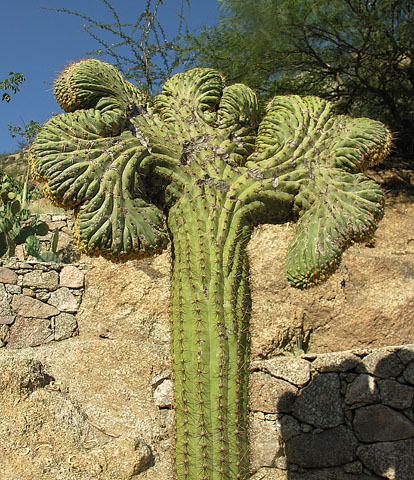
Crested plant

== Distribution ==
It is native to several provinces including Jujuy, Tucumán, La Rioja, San Juan, Catamarca and Salta provinces in northwestern Argentina, and is the eponymous cactus of Los Cardones National Park in Salta Province. Range continues to the western slopes of the Andes in Peru, Bolivia department of Tarija, and Ecuador. It is found growing on dry slopes and deciduous forest of the Andean foothills at altitudes of 500 to 1500 meters. Plant grows in habitats below those where Leucostele atacamensis subsp. pasacana where they hybridize in zones where the two species meet.

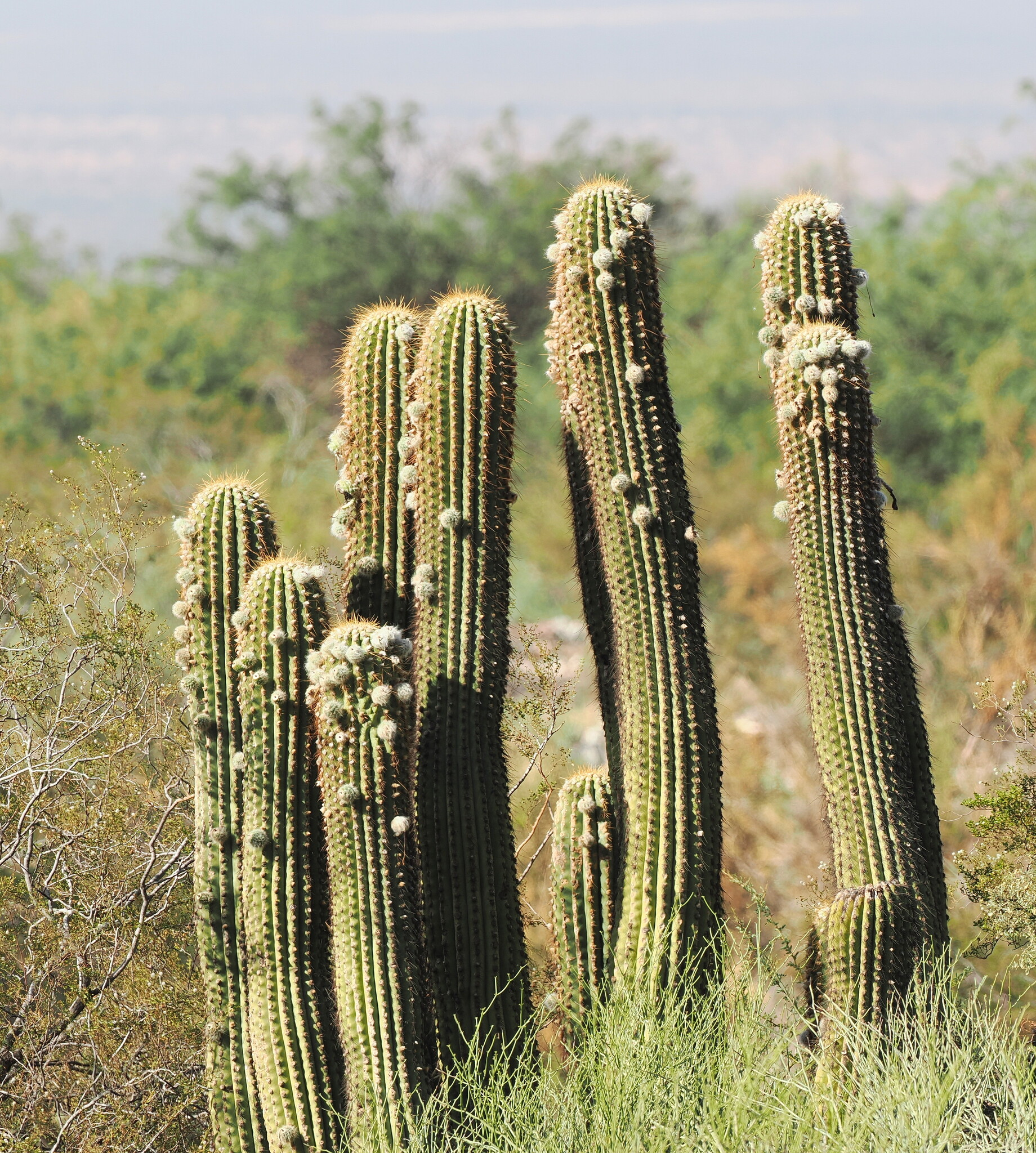
Plant in Santa Florentina, La Rioja Province, Argentina

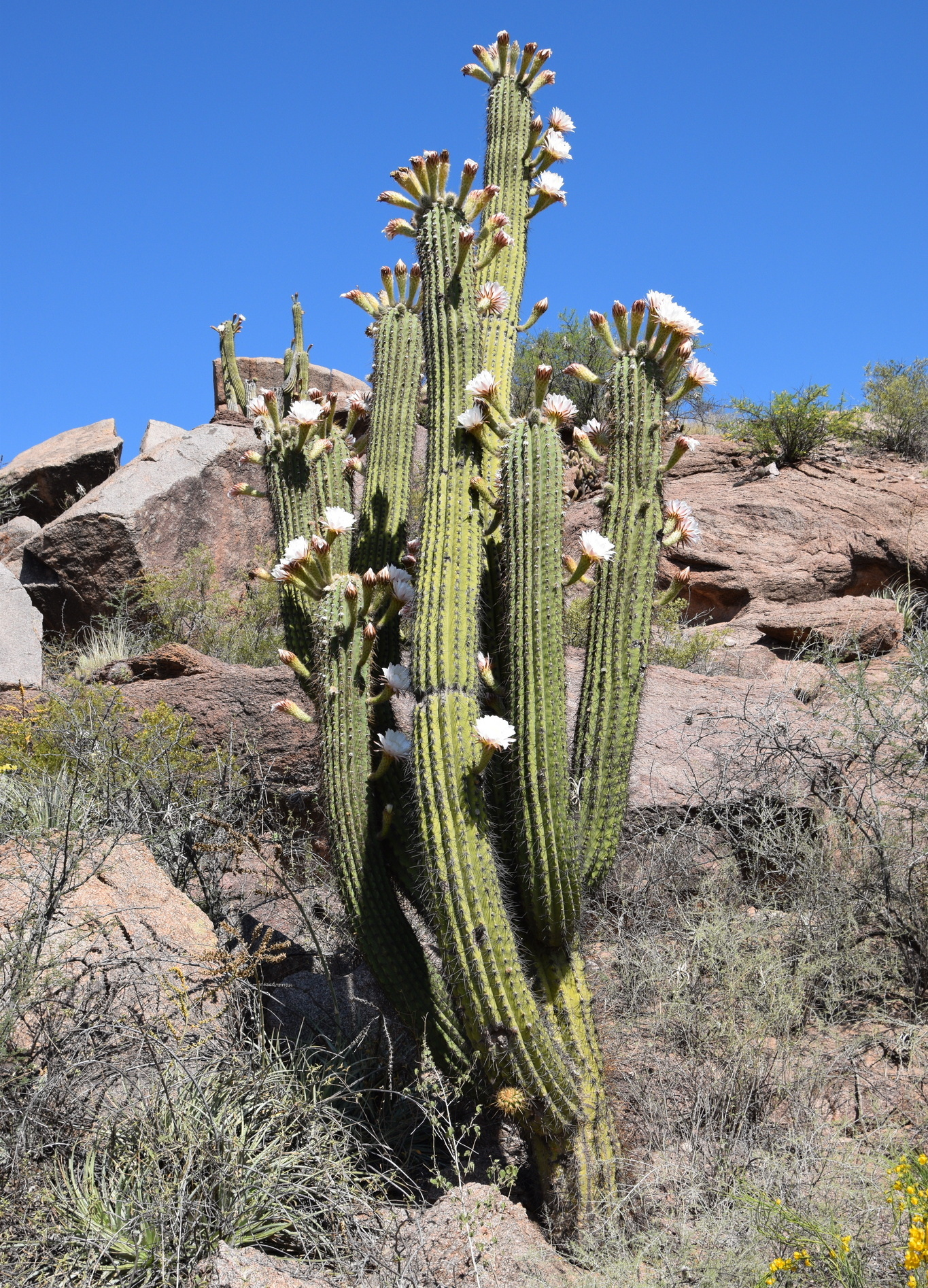
Blooming plant in habitat in Los Mogotes Colorados, La Rioja Province, Argentina

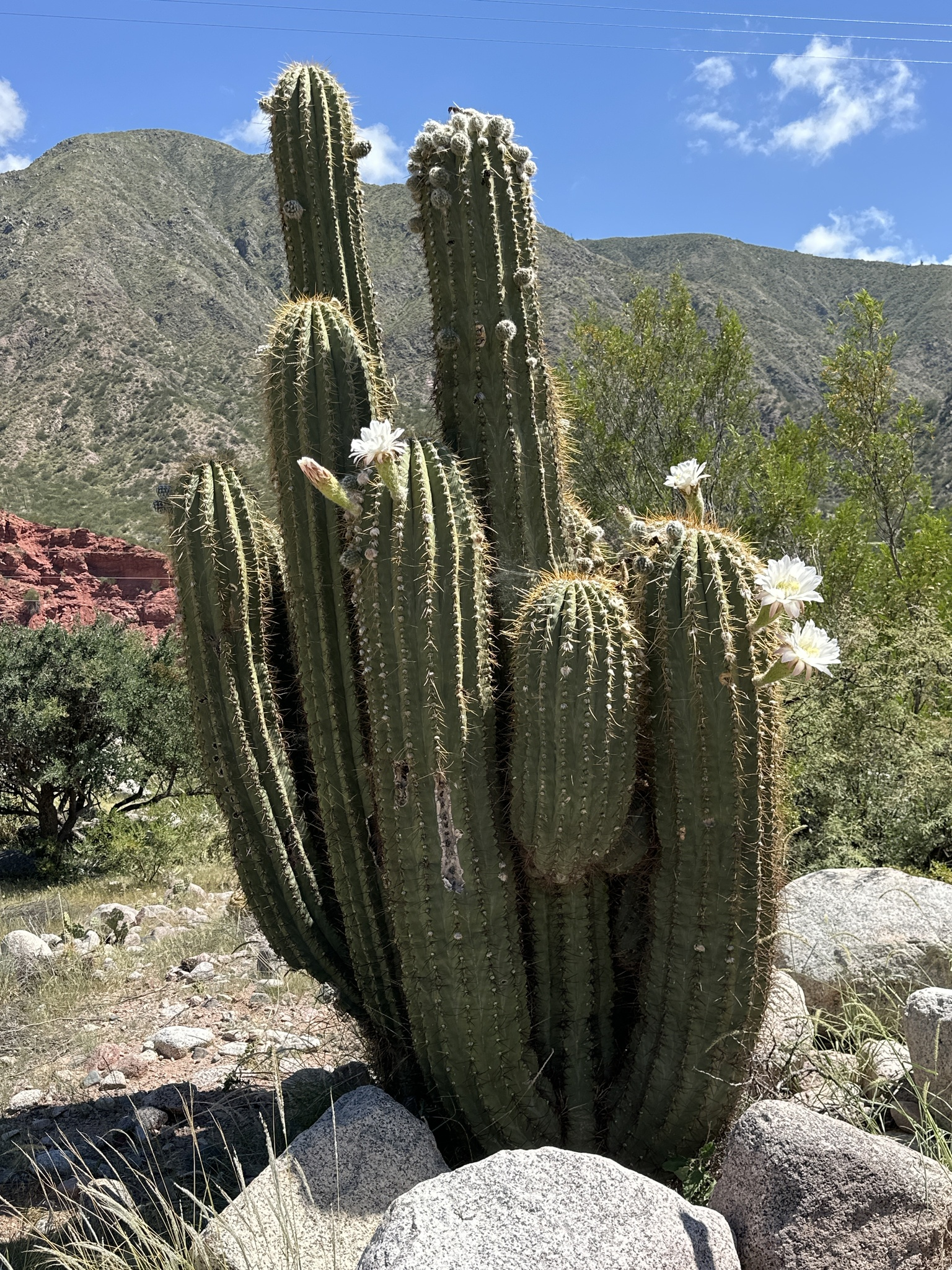
Habitat in Sañogasta, La Rioja Province, Argentina

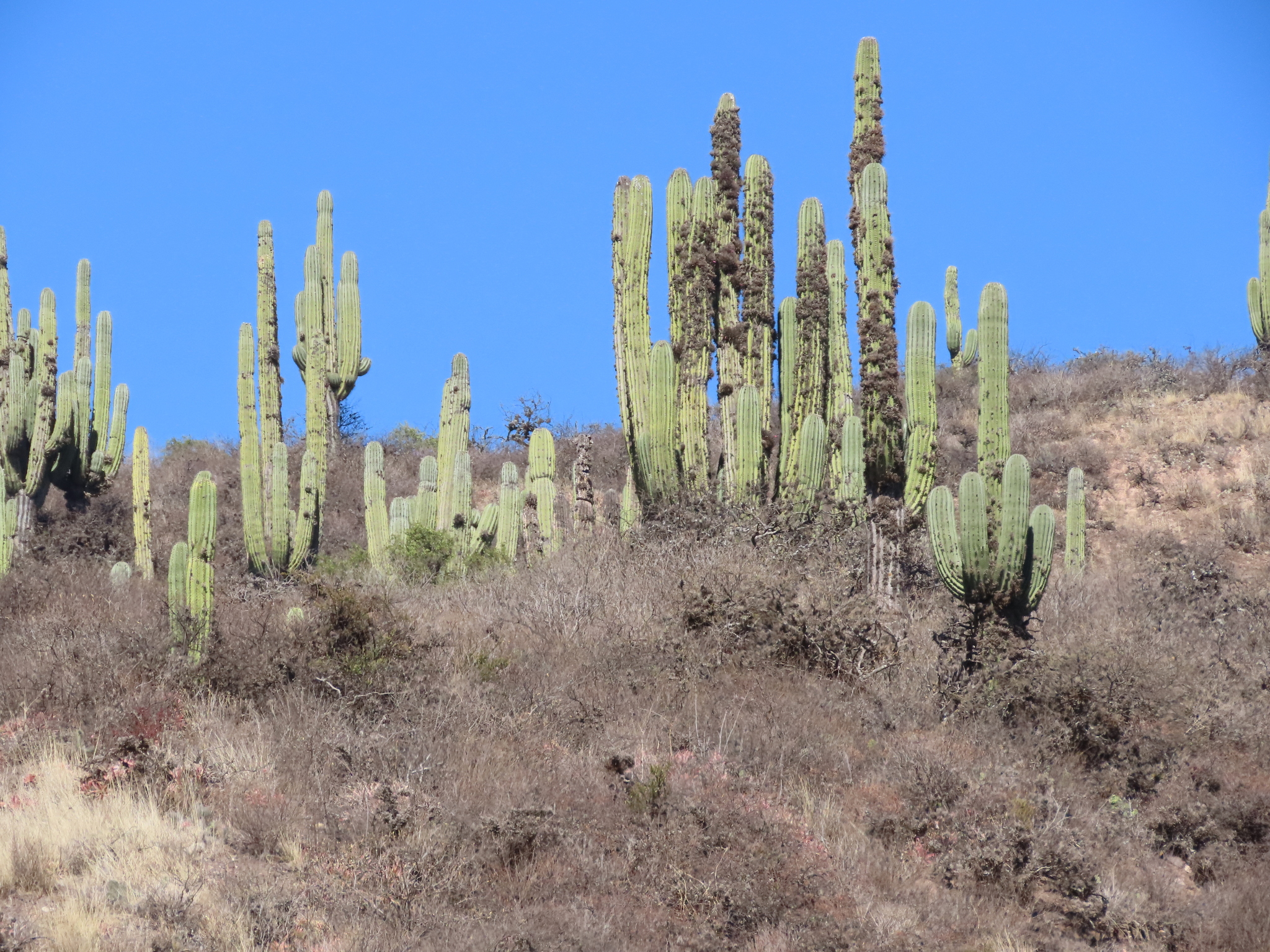
Habitat in Escoipe, Salta Province, Argentina

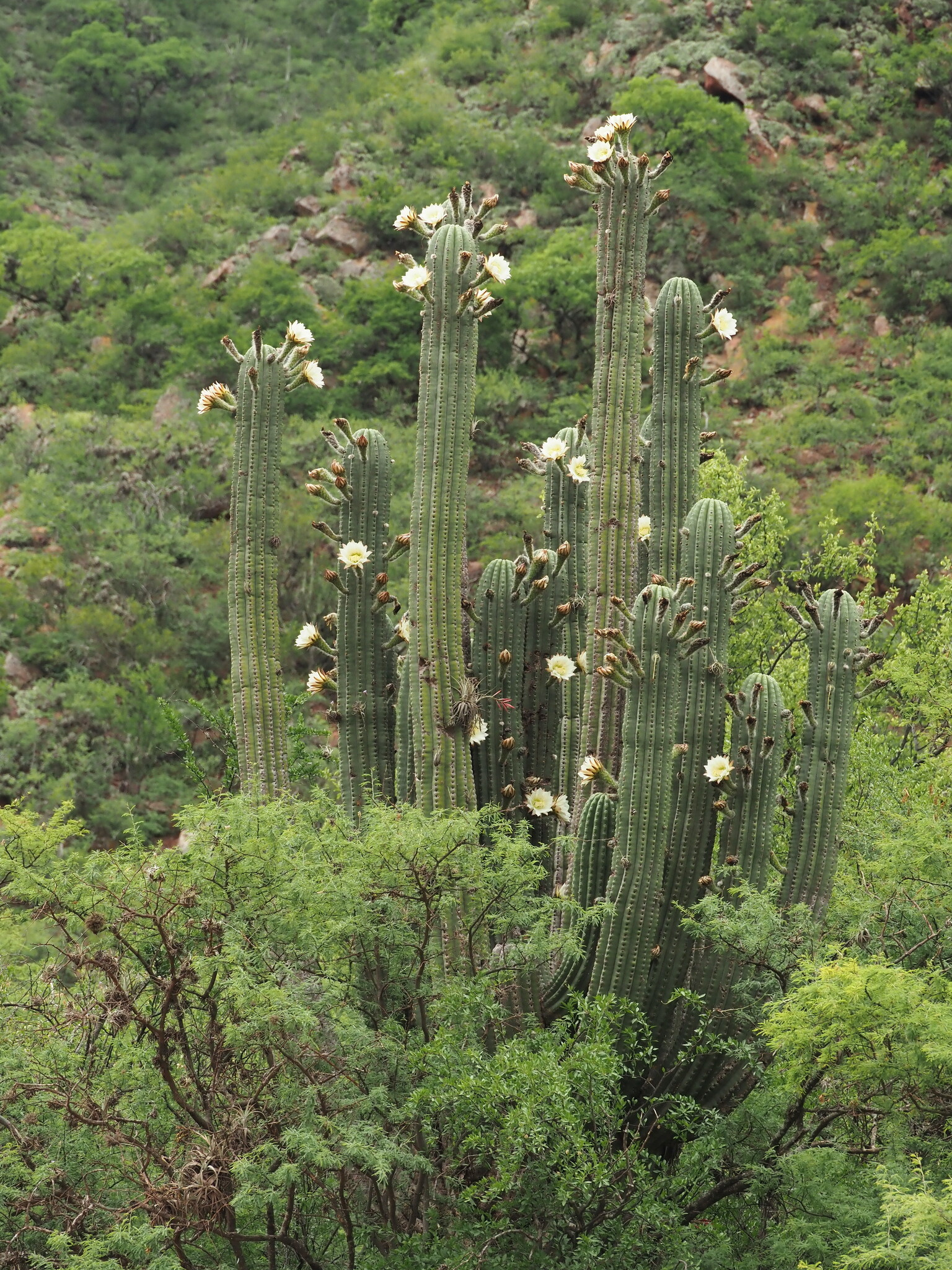
Habitat in San Antonio, Salta Province, Argentina

== Taxonomy ==
This species was first described as Cereus terscheckii by Ludwig Georg Karl Pfeiffer was published in 1837. Heimo Friedrich and Gordon Douglas Rowley placed the species in the genus Echinopsis in 1974. The specific epithet terscheckii honors the court gardener Carl Adolph Terscheck of Japanisches Palais in Dresden. In 2012, Boris O. Schlumpberger reclassified the species into the genus Leucostele.

== Pharmacology ==
Leucostele terscheckii contains > 0.005-0.025% mescaline in fresh cactus and 0.01%-2.375% mescaline in dry weight, so dried cactus is sometimes processed for mescaline hydrochloride. The cactus also contains greater amounts of trichocereine.
