= N,N-Diformylmescaline =

Clinical data
- Other names: Diformylmescaline; N,N-Diformyl-3,4,5-trimethoxyphenethylamine; N,N-Diformyl-3,4,5-TMPEA
- Drug class: Serotonergic psychedelic; Hallucinogen
- ATC code: None

Identifiers
- IUPAC name: N-formyl-N-[2-(3,4,5-trimethoxyphenyl)ethyl]formamide
- PubChem CID: 168310590
- ChemSpider: 128937882

Chemical and physical data
- Formula: C_{13}H_{17}NO_{5}
- Molar mass: 267.281 g·mol^{−1}
- 3D model (JSmol): Interactive image
- SMILES: COC1=CC(=CC(=C1OC)OC)CCN(C=O)C=O
- InChI: InChI=1S/C13H17NO5/c1-17-11-6-10(4-5-14(8-15)9-16)7-12(18-2)13(11)19-3/h6-9H,4-5H2,1-3H3; Key:ONCGKRHDZQPRFG-UHFFFAOYSA-N

N,N-Diformylmescaline, also known as N,N-diformyl-3,4,5-trimethoxyphenethylamine, is a possible psychedelic drug of the phenethylamine and scaline families related to mescaline. It is the N,N-diformyl derivative of mescaline. The compound has been found to be chemically unstable under acidic or basic conditions, breaking down into N-formylmescaline and then into mescaline. Relatedly, it is thought that N,N-diformylmescaline may act as a prodrug of mescaline in vivo. The chemical synthesis of the compound has been described. It was encountered as a possible novel designer drug in 2020 and this was reported in 2022. N,N-Diformylmescaline itself is not known to be naturally occurring, but N-formylmescaline is known to occur naturally in trace amounts in peyote. It is not a controlled substance in Canada as of 2025.

== See also ==
- Scaline
- N-Formylmescaline
- N-Acetylmescaline
- N-Methylmescaline
- Trichocereine (N,N-dimethylmescaline)
