= N-Methyl-DOI =

Clinical data
- Other names: 2,5-Dimethoxy-4-iodo-N-methylamphetamine; 4-Iodo-2,5-dimethoxy-N-methylamphetamine; 2,5-IDNA; N-Me-DOI
- Drug class: Serotonin receptor modulator; Serotonin 5-HT_{2A} receptor partial agonist
- ATC code: None

Identifiers
- IUPAC name: 1-(4-iodo-2,5-dimethoxyphenyl)-N-methylpropan-2-amine
- PubChem CID: 44267102
- ChemSpider: 23110915
- ChEMBL: ChEMBL10968

Chemical and physical data
- Formula: C_{12}H_{18}INO_{2}
- Molar mass: 335.185 g·mol^{−1}
- 3D model (JSmol): Interactive image
- SMILES: CC(CC1=CC(=C(C=C1OC)I)OC)NC
- InChI: InChI=1S/C12H18INO2/c1-8(14-2)5-9-6-12(16-4)10(13)7-11(9)15-3/h6-8,14H,5H2,1-4H3; Key:UFHCKYRPMINDBF-UHFFFAOYSA-N

N-Methyl-DOI, also known as 2,5-dimethoxy-4-iodo-N-methylamphetamine (2,5-IDNA), is a serotonin receptor modulator of the phenethylamine, amphetamine, and DOx families related to the serotonergic psychedelic DOI. It is a potent agonist of the serotonin 5-HT_{2A} receptor similarly to DOI. However, N-methyl-DOI was about 3.8-fold less potent than DOI as a serotonin 5-HT_{2A} receptor agonist in terms of EC_{50} and showed reduced maximal efficacy compared to DOI (E_{max} = 64% vs. 83%). On the other hand, it showed similar efficacy in activating the serotonin 5-HT_{2A} receptor to the psychedelic 2C-I (E_{max} = 68%). N-Methyl-DOI was first described in the scientific literature, as a potential radiopharmaceutical for medical imaging, by Alexander Shulgin and colleagues by 1984. It is a controlled substance in Canada under phenethylamine blanket-ban language.

== See also ==
- DOx (psychedelics)
- IDNNA (N,N-dimethyl-DOI)
- Methyl-DOB (N-methyl-DOB)
- N-Methyl-2C-I
- N-Methyl-2C-B
- Beatrice (N-methyl-DOM)
- N-Methyl-DOET
