= Los Cardones National Park =

National park of Argentina

- IUCN category II (national park)
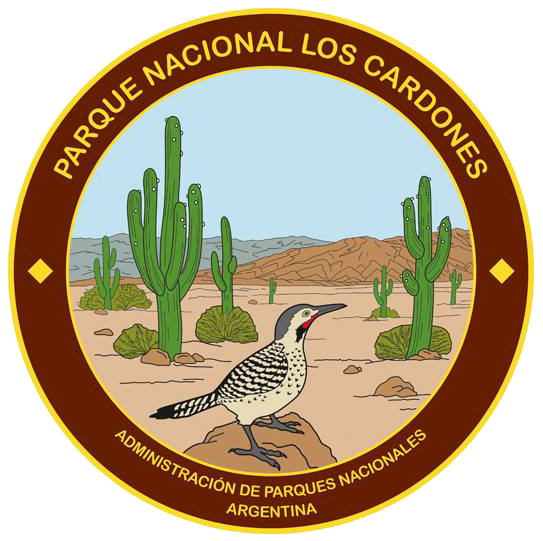
- Emblem of the Los Cardones National Park

- Location within Argentina
- Location: Salta Province, Argentina
- Coordinates: 25°07′30″S 66°10′55″W
- Area: 650 km^{2} (250 sq mi)
- Established: 1996
- Governing body: Administración de Parques Nacionales

Los Cardones National Park (Spanish: Parque Nacional Los Cardones) is a national park of Argentina, located in the center-west of the province of Salta, within the San Carlos and Cachi Departments, in the Argentine Northwest.

== Location ==
The park protects an area of the High Monte ecoregion. The park has an area of 650 square kilometres, with hills and ravines at the height levels between 2,700 m and 5,000 m. It gets its name from the prevalence of bush formations of cardon grande cactus. It features fossil remains of extinct animals, as well as dinosaur tracks.

The protected area was created in 1996, when the National Parks Administration acquired the land from private owners.

== Climate ==
Most of the park has an arid climate that is characterized by a large thermal amplitude (large difference between day and night temperatures). The park receives an average rainfall of 150 mm (5.9 in); most of it falling between November and March. Snowfall is extremely rare in low-lying areas. Mean temperatures range from 11 °C (51.8 °F) in winter to 18 °C (64.4 °F) in summer.

== Gallery ==
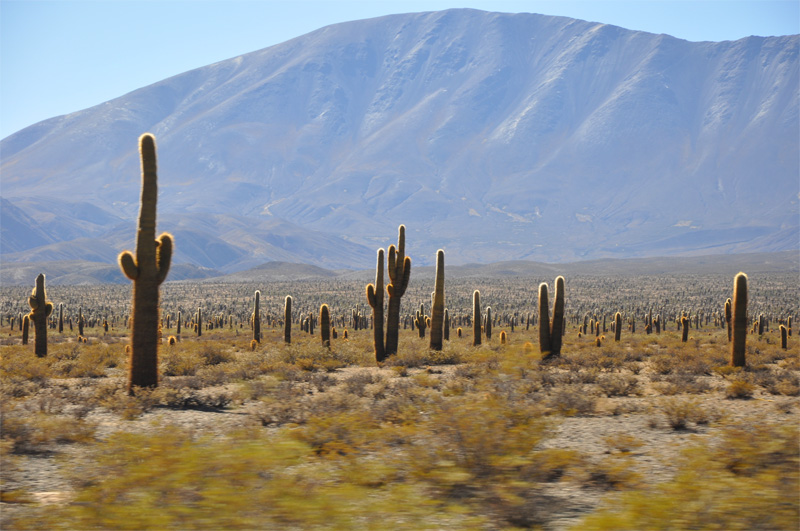
Cardones.

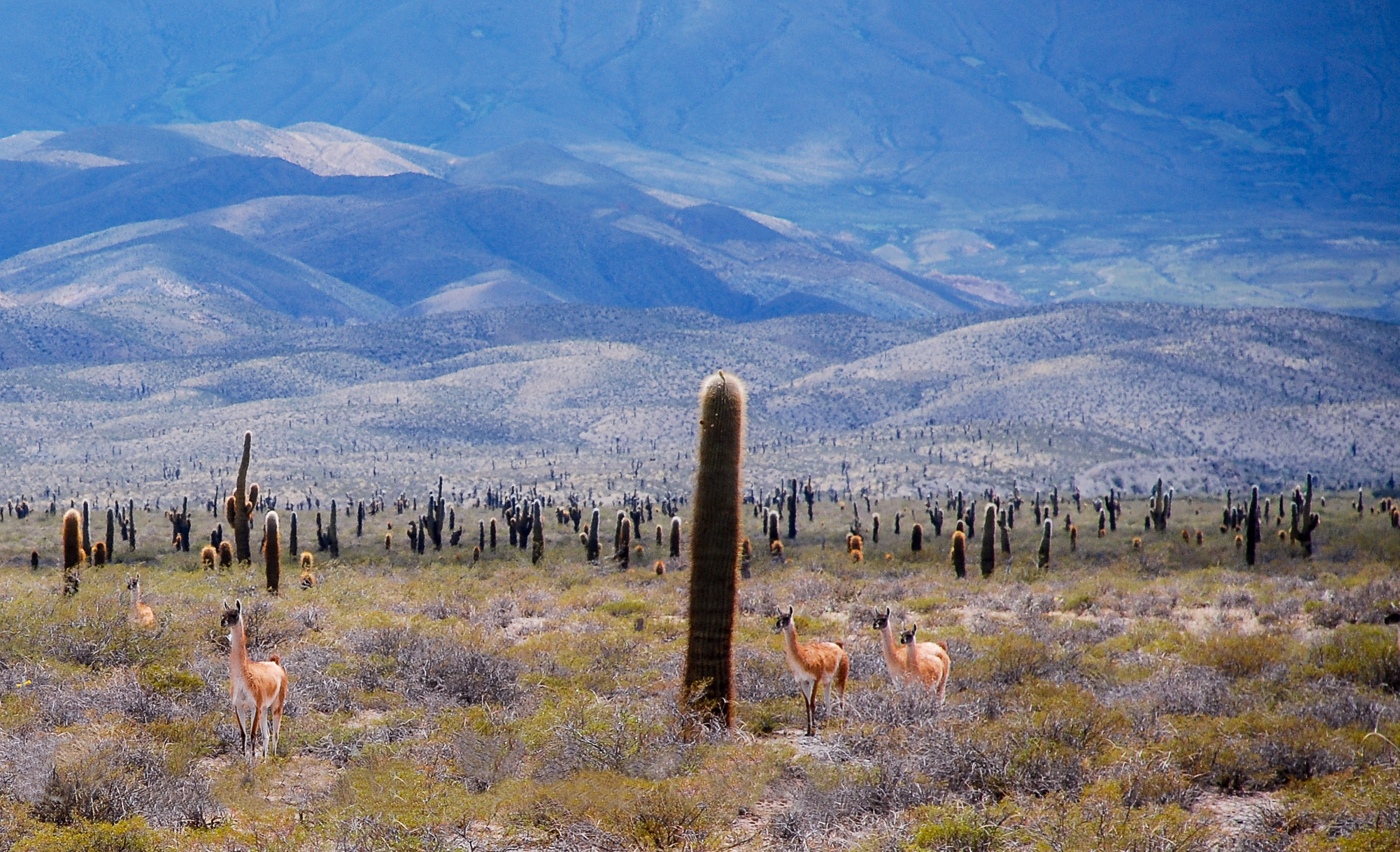
Cardones.

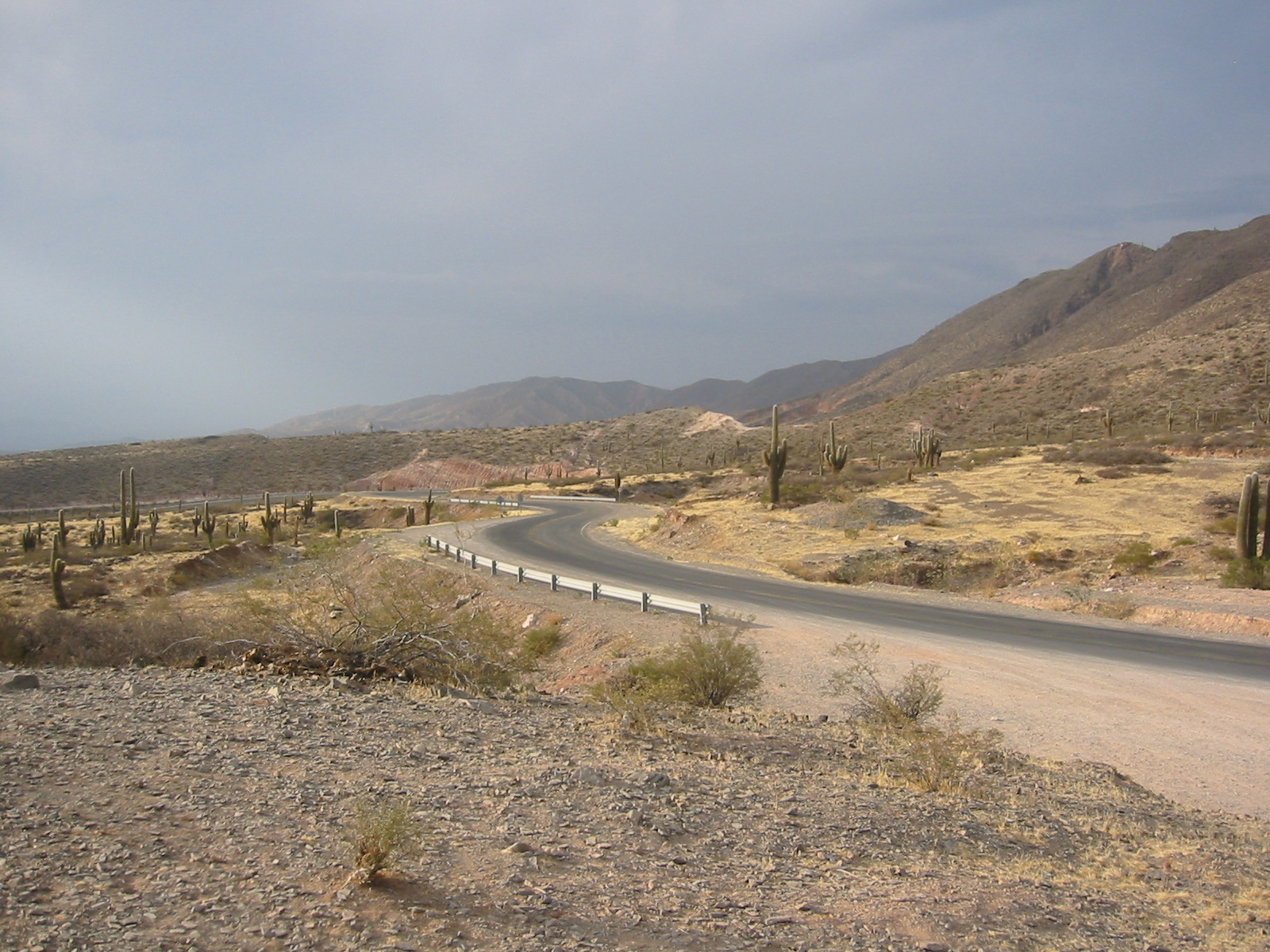
Road to Cachi.

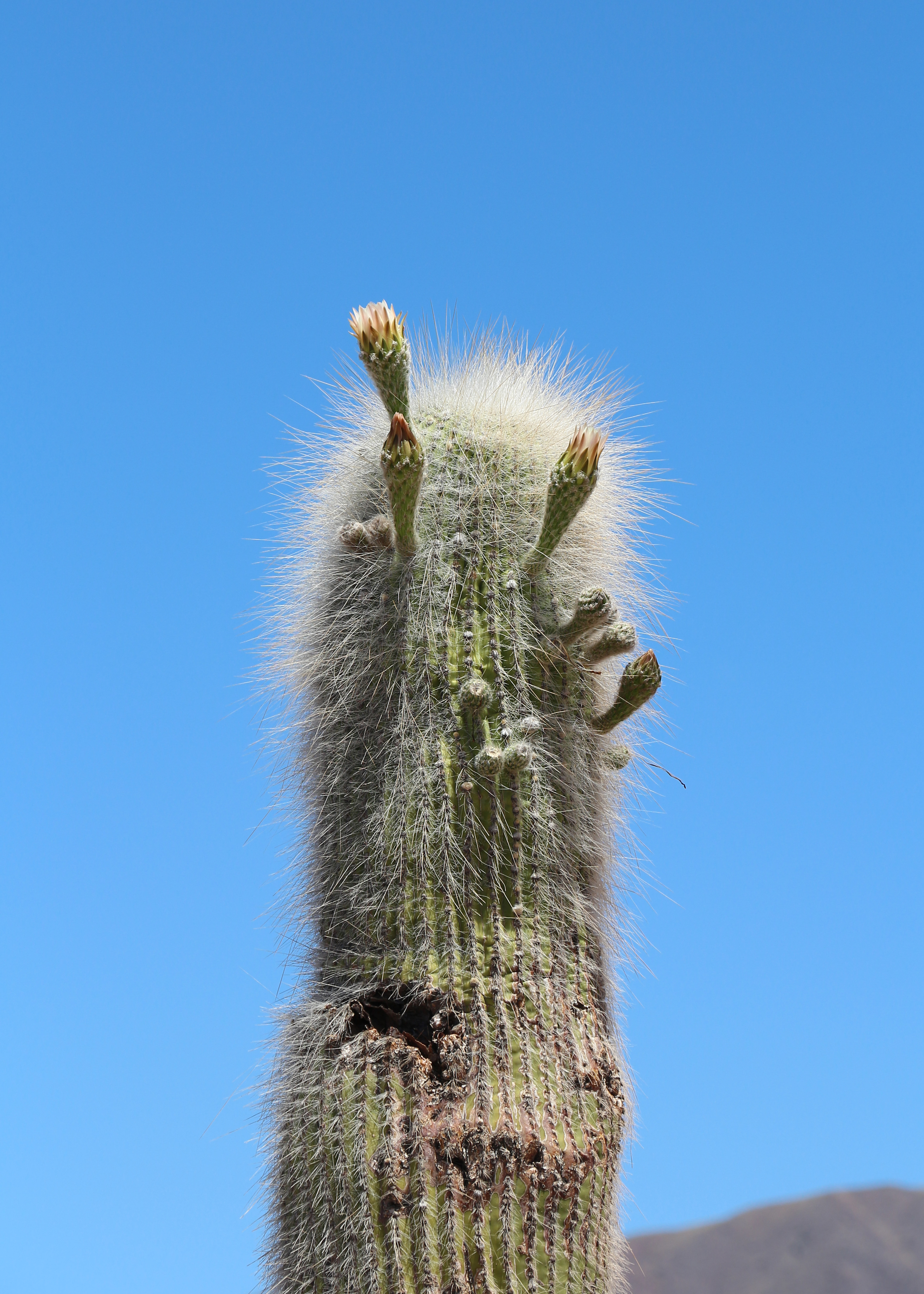
Cardon grande cactus

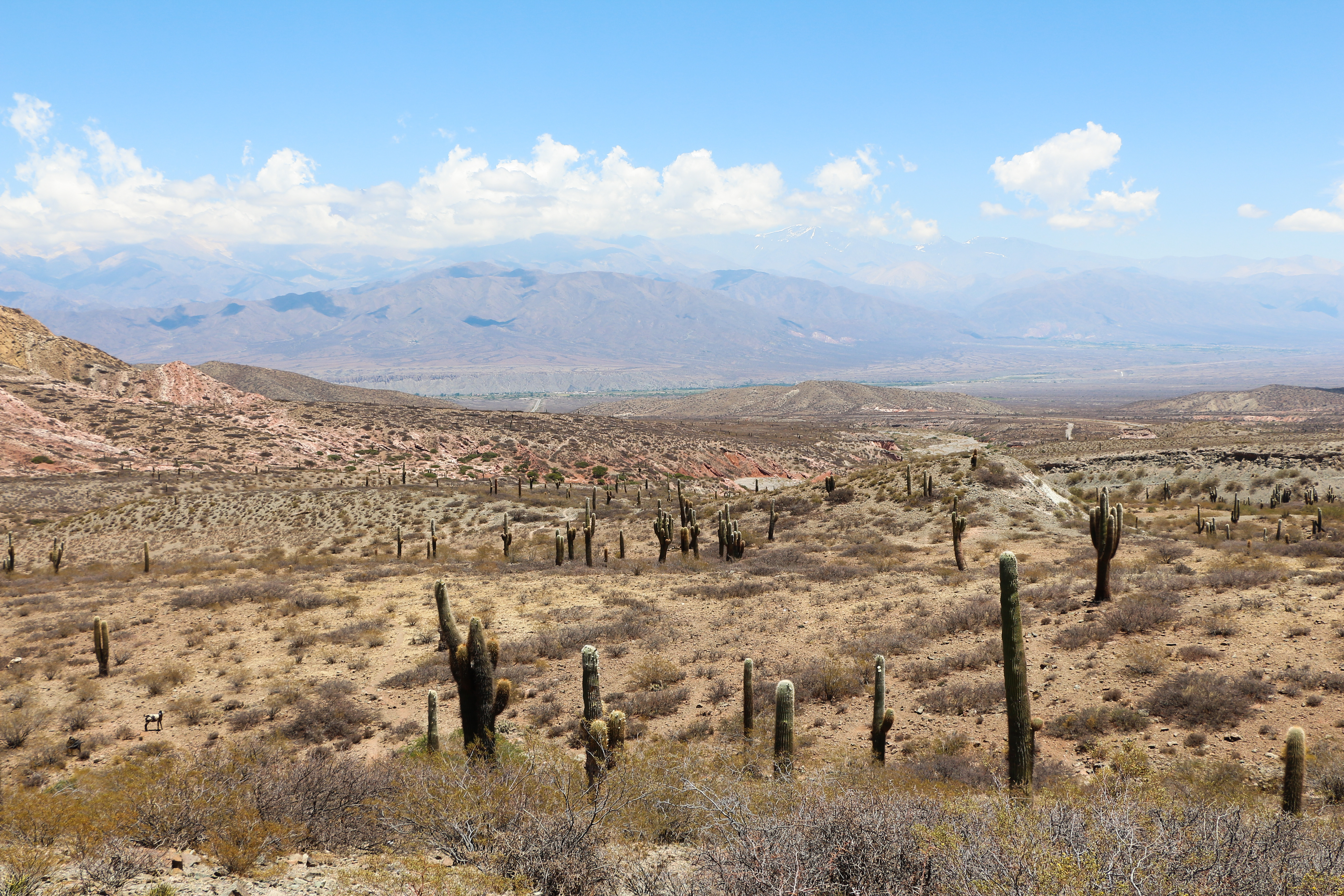
View of Los Cardones National Park
