= Methyl-DMA =

Clinical data
- Other names: METHYL-DMA; N-Methyl-3,4-DMA; 2,5-Dimethoxy-N-methylamphetamine; N-Methyl-DMA; N-Methyl-2,5-dimethoxyamphetamine; N-Methyl-DOH; Methyl-DOH; 2,5-DMMA; DMMA; EA-1322
- Routes of administration: Oral, intravenous
- Drug class: Serotonin receptor modulator; Psychoactive drug
- ATC code: None

Pharmacokinetic data
- Duration of action: Unknown

Identifiers
- IUPAC name: 1-(2,5-dimethoxyphenyl)-N-methylpropan-2-amine
- CAS Number: 54687-43-3
- PubChem CID: 3048401
- ChemSpider: 2310630
- UNII: 3ENR33265E
- CompTox Dashboard (EPA): DTXSID30388848

Chemical and physical data
- Formula: C_{12}H_{19}NO_{2}
- Molar mass: 209.289 g·mol^{−1}
- 3D model (JSmol): Interactive image
- SMILES: O(c1ccc(OC)cc1CC(NC)C)C
- InChI: InChI=1S/C12H19NO2/c1-9(13-2)7-10-8-11(14-3)5-6-12(10)15-4/h5-6,8-9,13H,7H2,1-4H3; Key:RSDBPMOXIPCTPN-UHFFFAOYSA-N

Methyl-DMA, also known as 2,5-dimethoxy-N-methylamphetamine or as N-methyl-2,5-DMA, is a psychoactive drug of the phenethylamine, amphetamine, and DOx families. It is the N-methyl derivative of 2,5-dimethoxyamphetamine (2,5-DMA; DOH).

In his book PiHKAL (Phenethylamines I Have Known and Loved), Alexander Shulgin lists methyl-DMA's dose as above 250 mg orally and its duration as unknown. The drug produced slight paresthesia and no other effects at tested doses of up to 250 mg orally. Other mixed and inconsistent anecdotal reports have also been described, with effects including nothing at all, threshold effects, "complete and thorough experiences", real awareness [of effects], tingling in genitalia, strange presence in the spine, and increased body temperature and blood pressure. These effects were said to persist for many hours. No clear hallucinogenic effects were described.

Methyl-DMA shows affinity for serotonin receptors in the rat stomach fundus strip (A_{2} = 316 nM). Its affinity in this assay was about 2-fold lower than that of 2,5-DMA and about 4-fold lower than that of DOM.

The chemical synthesis of methyl-DMA has been described. Analogues of methyl-DMA include Beatrice (N-methyl-DOM), methyl-TMA-2 (N-methyl-TMA-2), methyl-TMA (N-methyl-TMA), and para-methoxyamphetamine (PMMA; methyl-MA), among others. N-Methylation of psychedelic phenethylamines is well-known to greatly reduce or abolish their hallucinogenic activity.

Methyl-DMA was studied at Edgewood Arsenal under the code name EA‐1322 in the early 1950s. It was first described in the scientific literature by Richard Glennon and colleagues by 1978. Subsequently, the drug was described in greater detail by Shulgin in PiHKAL in 1991. Methyl-DMA has reportedly been encountered as a novel designer drug. It is a controlled substance in Canada under phenethylamine blanket-ban language.

== See also ==
- DOx (psychedelics)
