= N-Methyl-2C-I =

Clinical data
- Other names: 25I-NMe; N-Methyl-4-iodo-2,5-dimethoxyphenethylamine
- Drug class: Serotonin receptor modulator
- ATC code: None

Identifiers
- IUPAC name: 2-(4-iodo-2,5-dimethoxyphenyl)-N-methylethan-1-amine

Chemical and physical data
- Formula: C_{11}H_{16}INO_{2}
- Molar mass: 321.158 g·mol^{−1}
- 3D model (JSmol): Interactive image
- SMILES: CNCCc1cc(OC)c(cc1OC)I
- InChI: InChI=1S/C11H16INO2/c1-13-5-4-8-6-11(15-3)9(12)7-10(8)14-2/h6-7,13H,4-5H2,1-3H3; Key:VKPKTPYPZITMRK-UHFFFAOYSA-N

N-Methyl-2C-I, also known as 25I-NMe or as N-methyl-4-iodo-2,5-dimethoxyphenethylamine, is a serotonin receptor modulator of the phenethylamine and 2C families related to the psychedelic drug 2C-I. It is specifically the N-methyl analogue of 2C-I.

The drug shows more than 2,500-fold reduced affinity for the serotonin 5-HT_{2A} receptor compared to 2C-I. In addition, N-methyl-2C-I showed around 170-fold lower affinity for the serotonin 5-HT_{2C} receptor relative to 2C-I. These results are in accordance with general findings that N-alkylation of psychedelic phenethylamines results in dramatic or complete losses of psychedelic and related activities. In contrast to simple N-alkylation however, the N-benzyl derivative of 2C-I, 25I-NB (N-benzyl-2C-I), showed similar affinity for the serotonin 5-HT_{2A} receptor compared to 2C-I itself. Relatedly, the N-(2-methoxybenzyl) derivatives, such as 25I-NBOMe, have not only retained but greatly enhanced activity and constitute the extremely potent NBOMe family of psychedelics.

N-Methyl-2C-I was first described in the scientific literature by at least 2012. It is a controlled substance in Canada under phenethylamine blanket-ban language.

== See also ==
- 2C (psychedelics)
- N-Methyl-2C-B
- N-Ethyl-2C-B
- N-Methyl-DOI
- IDNNA (N,N-dimethyl-DOI)
- N-Methylmescaline
