= N-Formylmescaline =

Clinical data
- Other names: Formylmescaline; N-Formyl-3,4,5-trimethoxyphenethylamine; N-Formyl-3,4,5-TMPEA
- Drug class: Serotonergic psychedelic; Hallucinogen
- ATC code: None

Identifiers
- IUPAC name: N-[2-(3,4,5-trimethoxyphenyl)ethyl]formamide
- PubChem CID: 20156351

Chemical and physical data
- Formula: C_{12}H_{17}NO_{4}
- Molar mass: 239.271 g·mol^{−1}
- 3D model (JSmol): Interactive image
- SMILES: COC1=CC(=CC(=C1OC)OC)CCNC=O
- InChI: InChI=1S/C12H17NO4/c1-15-10-6-9(4-5-13-8-14)7-11(16-2)12(10)17-3/h6-8H,4-5H2,1-3H3,(H,13,14); Key:BESRMWQCUXKEMP-UHFFFAOYSA-N

N-Formylmescaline, also known as N-formyl-3,4,5-trimethoxyphenethylamine, is an alkaloid and possible psychedelic drug of the phenethylamine and scaline families related to mescaline. It is the N-formyl derivative of mescaline. N,N-Diformylmescaline has been found to be chemically unstable under acidic or basic conditions, breaking down into N-formylmescaline, which then further degrades into mescaline. Relatedly, it is thought that N-formylmescaline and N,N-diformylmescaline may act as prodrugs of mescaline in vivo. N-Formylmescaline is known to occur naturally in trace amounts in peyote. It is not a controlled substance in Canada as of 2025.

== See also ==
- Scaline
- N,N-Diformylmescaline
- N-Acetylmescaline
- Trichocereine (N,N-dimethylmescaline)
- N-Methylmescaline
