= N-Methyl-2C-B =

Clinical data
- Other names: N-Me-2C-B; 2C-B-M; 2C-BM; 4-Bromo-2,5-dimethoxy-N-methylphenethylamine; 2,5-Dimethoxy-4-bromo-N-methylphenethylamine
- Drug class: Serotonin receptor modulator
- ATC code: None

Legal status
- Legal status: In general Unscheduled

Identifiers
- IUPAC name: 2-(4-bromo-2,5-dimethoxyphenyl)-N-methylethanamine
- CAS Number: 155639-22-8
- PubChem CID: 9970546
- ChemSpider: 8146138
- UNII: X5VFU3X44E
- ChEMBL: ChEMBL57000

Chemical and physical data
- Formula: C_{11}H_{16}BrNO_{2}
- Molar mass: 274.158 g·mol^{−1}
- 3D model (JSmol): Interactive image
- SMILES: CNCCC1=CC(=C(C=C1OC)Br)OC
- InChI: InChI=1S/C11H16BrNO2/c1-13-5-4-8-6-11(15-3)9(12)7-10(8)14-2/h6-7,13H,4-5H2,1-3H3; Key:ZRTYZUYYGULHEW-UHFFFAOYSA-N

N-Methyl-2C-B, or N-Me-2C-B, also known as 2C-B-M or 2C-BM, as well as 4-bromo-2,5-dimethoxy-N-methylphenethylamine, is a serotonin receptor modulator of the phenethylamine and 2C families. It is the N-methyl derivative of 2C-B.

== Use and effects ==
N-Methyl-2C-B has been tested in humans by P. Rausch and was reported to be completely inactive.

== Pharmacology ==
=== Pharmacodynamics ===
N-Methyl-2C-B showed affinity for the serotonin 5-HT_{2} receptors, specifically for the serotonin 5-HT_{2A} and 5-HT_{2C} receptors. Its affinities (K_{i}) were 2.9 nM for the DOI-labeled serotonin 5-HT_{2A} receptor, 380 nM for the ketanserin-labeled serotonin 5-HT_{2A} receptor, and 100 nM for the serotonin 5-HT_{2C} receptor. These affinities were approximately 3-fold, 11-fold, and 3-fold lower than those of 2C-B, respectively.

== History ==
N-Methyl-2C-B was first described in the scientific literature by Richard Glennon and colleagues by 1994. It was encountered as a novel designer drug in Europe in 2014.

== Society and culture ==
=== Legal status ===
==== Canada ====
N-Methyl-2C-B is a controlled substance in Canada under phenethylamine blanket-ban language.

== See also ==
- 2C (psychedelics)
- N-Ethyl-2C-B
- N-Methyl-2C-I
- Methyl-DOB (N-methyl-DOB)
- N-Methyl-DOI
- IDNNA (N,N-dimethyl-DOI)
- 25B-NB (N-benzyl-2C-B)
- 25B-NBOMe
