= N-Acetylmescaline =

Clinical data
- Other names: NAM; Mescaline acetamide; N-Acetyl-3,4,5-trimethoxyphenethylamine

Identifiers
- IUPAC name: N-[2-(3,4,5-trimethoxyphenyl)ethyl]acetamide
- CAS Number: 4593-89-9
- PubChem CID: 100597
- ChemSpider: 90893
- UNII: U68P9VX8EK
- CompTox Dashboard (EPA): DTXSID10196660

Chemical and physical data
- Formula: C_{13}H_{19}NO_{4}
- Molar mass: 253.298 g·mol^{−1}
- 3D model (JSmol): Interactive image
- Melting point: 93 to 94 °C (199 to 201 °F)
- SMILES: O=C(NCCc1cc(OC)c(OC)c(OC)c1)C
- InChI: InChI=1S/C13H19NO4/c1-9(15)14-6-5-10-7-11(16-2)13(18-4)12(8-10)17-3/h7-8H,5-6H2,1-4H3,(H,14,15); Key:SNMFNOQKGANWHD-UHFFFAOYSA-N

N-Acetylmescaline, also known as mescaline acetamide or as N-acetyl-3,4,5-trimethoxyphenethylamine, is a mescaline derivative found in trace quantities in peyote (Lophophora williamsii). It is a minor metabolite of mescaline in humans, but has little pharmacological activity of its own. At doses of 306 to 756 mg orally, only mild drowsiness was observed at the highest dose. Hence, N-acetylmescaline appears to be inactive as a hallucinogen. N-Acetylmescaline has microtubule assembly inhibitory activity. The chemical synthesis of N-acetylmescaline has been described. N-Acetylmescaline was isolated and first synthesized by Ernst Späth and Johann Bruck and was described by them in the scientific literature in 1938.

== See also ==
- Substituted methoxyphenethylamine
- Scaline
- N-Formylmescaline
- N,N-Diformylmescaline
