= Beatrice (drug) =

Psychoactive drug

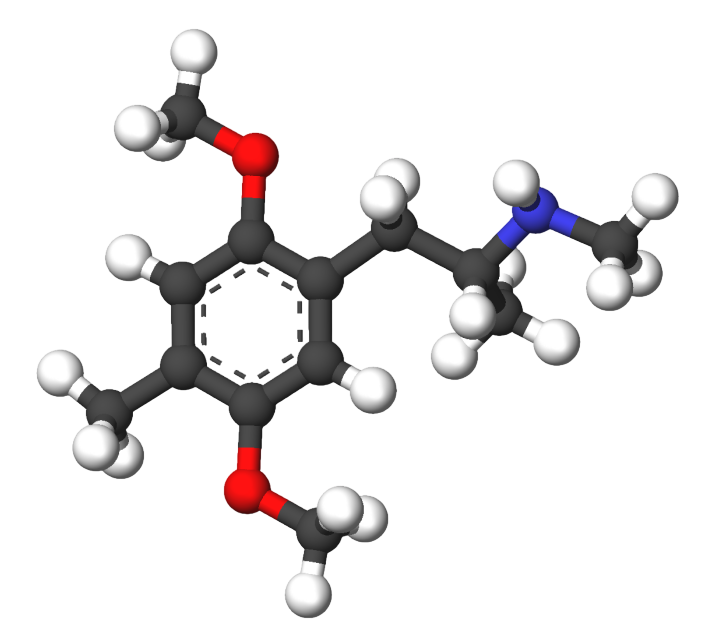

Clinical data
- Other names: BEATRICE; Béa; 4-Methyl-2,5-dimethoxy-N-methylamphetamine; 2,5-Dimethoxy-4-methyl-N-methylamphetamine; 2,5-Dimethoxy-4,N-dimethylamphetamine; N-Methyl-DOM; MDO-D; MDOM
- Routes of administration: Oral
- Drug class: Serotonin receptor modulator; Psychoactive drug; Stimulant
- ATC code: None

Pharmacokinetic data
- Duration of action: 6–10 hours

Identifiers
- IUPAC name: 1-(2,5-dimethoxy-4-methylphenyl)-N-methylpropan-2-amine
- CAS Number: 92206-37-6
- PubChem CID: 212480
- ChemSpider: 184247
- UNII: 4TM7A9W7KW
- ChEMBL: ChEMBL19044
- CompTox Dashboard (EPA): DTXSID20947125

Chemical and physical data
- Formula: C_{13}H_{21}NO_{2}
- Molar mass: 223.316 g·mol^{−1}
- 3D model (JSmol): Interactive image
- SMILES: O(c1cc(c(OC)cc1CC(NC)C)C)C
- InChI: InChI=1S/C13H21NO2/c1-9-6-13(16-5)11(7-10(2)14-3)8-12(9)15-4/h6,8,10,14H,7H2,1-5H3; Key:IWYGVDBZCSCJGT-UHFFFAOYSA-N

Beatrice, also known as 4-methyl-2,5-dimethoxy-N-methylamphetamine or as N-methyl-DOM, MDOM, or MDO-D, is a psychoactive drug of the phenethylamine, amphetamine, and DOx families. It is a substituted methamphetamine and a homologue of 2,5-dimethoxy-4-methylamphetamine (DOM).

== Use and effects ==
In his book PiHKAL (Phenethylamines I Have Known and Loved), Alexander Shulgin lists Beatrice's dose as above 30 mg orally and its duration as 6 to 10 hours. At tested doses of 20 to 30 mg orally, the effects of Beatrice have been reported to include openness, eroticism, responsivity, stimulant-like effects, physical effects, muscle tremors, restlessness, sleeping difficulties, diarrhea, and no appetite loss. No clear hallucinogenic effects were described. It is on the order of 10-fold less potent as a psychoactive drug than DOM and is further less potent in terms of hallucinogenic effects. Shulgin hypothesized that Beatrice might produce psychedelic effects at a dose of 75 mg orally, but did not feel comfortable exploring this level. The drug is one of Shulgin's "ten classic ladies", a series of methylated DOM derivatives.

== Pharmacology ==
=== Pharmacodynamics ===
Beatrice shows affinity for serotonin receptors. Its affinities (K_{i}) were 415 nM for the 5-HT_{2} receptor and 3,870 nM for the 5-HT_{1} receptor. The affinity of Beatrice for the serotonin 5-HT_{2} receptor was about 4-fold lower than that of DOM. Functional activities were not reported.

Beatrice fully substituted for DOM in rodent drug discrimination tests, albeit with approximately 9-fold lower potency in comparison.

== Chemistry ==
=== Synthesis ===
The chemical synthesis of Beatrice has been described.

=== Analogues ===
Analogues of Beatrice include N-methyl-DOET, N-methyl-DOI, N-methyl-DOB, IDNNA (N,N-dimethyl-DOI), N-methyl-TMA-2, and methyl-TMA (N-methyl-TMA), among others. N-Methyl-DOI is a potent agonist of the serotonin 5-HT_{2A} receptor similarly to DOI, but with several-fold reduced potency and slightly reduced efficacy.

== History ==
Beatrice was first described in the scientific literature by Beng T. Ho and colleagues in 1970. Subsequently, it was described in greater detail by Alexander Shulgin in his 1991 book PiHKAL (Phenethylamines I Have Known and Loved).

== Society and culture ==
=== Legal status ===
==== Canada ====
Beatrice is a controlled substance in Canada under phenethylamine blanket-ban language.

==== United States ====
In the United States, Beatrice is a Schedule I isomer of DOET.

== See also ==
- DOx (psychedelics)
