= Methyl-DOB =

Clinical data
- Other names: N-Methyl-DOB; N-Me-DOB; 4-Bromo-2,5-dimethoxy-N-methylamphetamine; MDOB; M-154
- Routes of administration: Oral
- Drug class: Serotonin receptor modulator; Psychoactive drug
- ATC code: None

Pharmacokinetic data
- Onset of action: 1.3 hours
- Duration of action: "Probably rather long"

Identifiers
- IUPAC name: 1-(4-bromo-2,5-dimethoxyphenyl)-N-methylpropan-2-amine
- CAS Number: 155638-80-5
- PubChem CID: 10085486
- ChemSpider: 8261023
- UNII: WW3LF52S82
- ChEMBL: ChEMBL351858
- CompTox Dashboard (EPA): DTXSID60435435

Chemical and physical data
- Formula: C_{12}H_{18}BrNO_{2}
- Molar mass: 288.185 g·mol^{−1}
- 3D model (JSmol): Interactive image
- SMILES: Brc1cc(OC)c(cc1OC)CC(NC)C
- InChI: InChI=1S/C12H18BrNO2/c1-8(14-2)5-9-6-12(16-4)10(13)7-11(9)15-3/h6-8,14H,5H2,1-4H3; Key:GURVSGCCXMIFMQ-UHFFFAOYSA-N

Methyl-DOB, or N-methyl-DOB, also known as 4-bromo-2,5-dimethoxy-N-methylamphetamine, MDOB, or M-154, is a psychoactive drug of the phenethylamine, amphetamine, and DOx families. It is the N-methyl derivative of the psychedelic drug DOB.

== Use and effects ==
In his book PiHKAL (Phenethylamines I Have Known and Loved), Alexander Shulgin lists methyl-DOB's dose as greater than 8 mg orally and its duration as "probably rather long". Its onset was about 1.3 hours. Analogously to the case of other N-methylated phenethylamines, the potency of methyl-DOB is dramatically reduced compared to DOB, which has a listed dose of 1 to 3 mg orally.

At tested doses of 8 to 10 mg orally, the effects of methyl-DOB have been reported to include lightheadedness, spaciness, physical effects or body load, tight and rubby teeth, tenseness, exaggerated reflexes, pupil dilation, and next-day hangover. No clear psychoactive or hallucinogenic effects were described. The drug may also potentiate other psychedelic drugs like even on the next day however, with a "severe response" to a low 5 mg dose of psilocybin 24 hours later occurring in one instance.

== Pharmacology ==
=== Pharmacodynamics ===
Methyl-DOB shows affinity for the serotonin 5-HT_{2A} and 5-HT_{2C} receptors (K_{i} = 79–80 nM and 98 nM, respectively). Its affinities for serotonin 5-HT_{2} receptors were 1.4- to 9.7-fold lower than those of DOB depending on the receptor and radioligand. Methyl-DOB substituted for (R)-DOB in rodent drug discrimination tests, but was approximately 16-fold less potent in comparison.

== Chemistry ==
=== Synthesis ===
The chemical synthesis of methyl-DOB has been described.

=== Analogues ===
Analogues of methyl-DOB include N-methyl-DOI, IDNNA (N,N-dimethyl-DOI), N-methyl-2C-B, Beatrice (N-methyl-DOM), N-methyl-DOET, N-methyl-TMA-2, and methyl-TMA (N-methyl-TMA), among others.

== History ==
Methyl-DOB was first described in the scientific literature by Richard Glennon and colleagues by 1987. Subsequently, it was described in greater detail by Alexander Shulgin in his book PiHKAL (Phenethylamines I Have Known and Loved) in 1991.

== Society and culture ==
=== Legal status ===
Methyl-DOB is a controlled substance in Canada under phenethylamine blanket-ban language.

== See also ==
- DOx (psychedelics)
