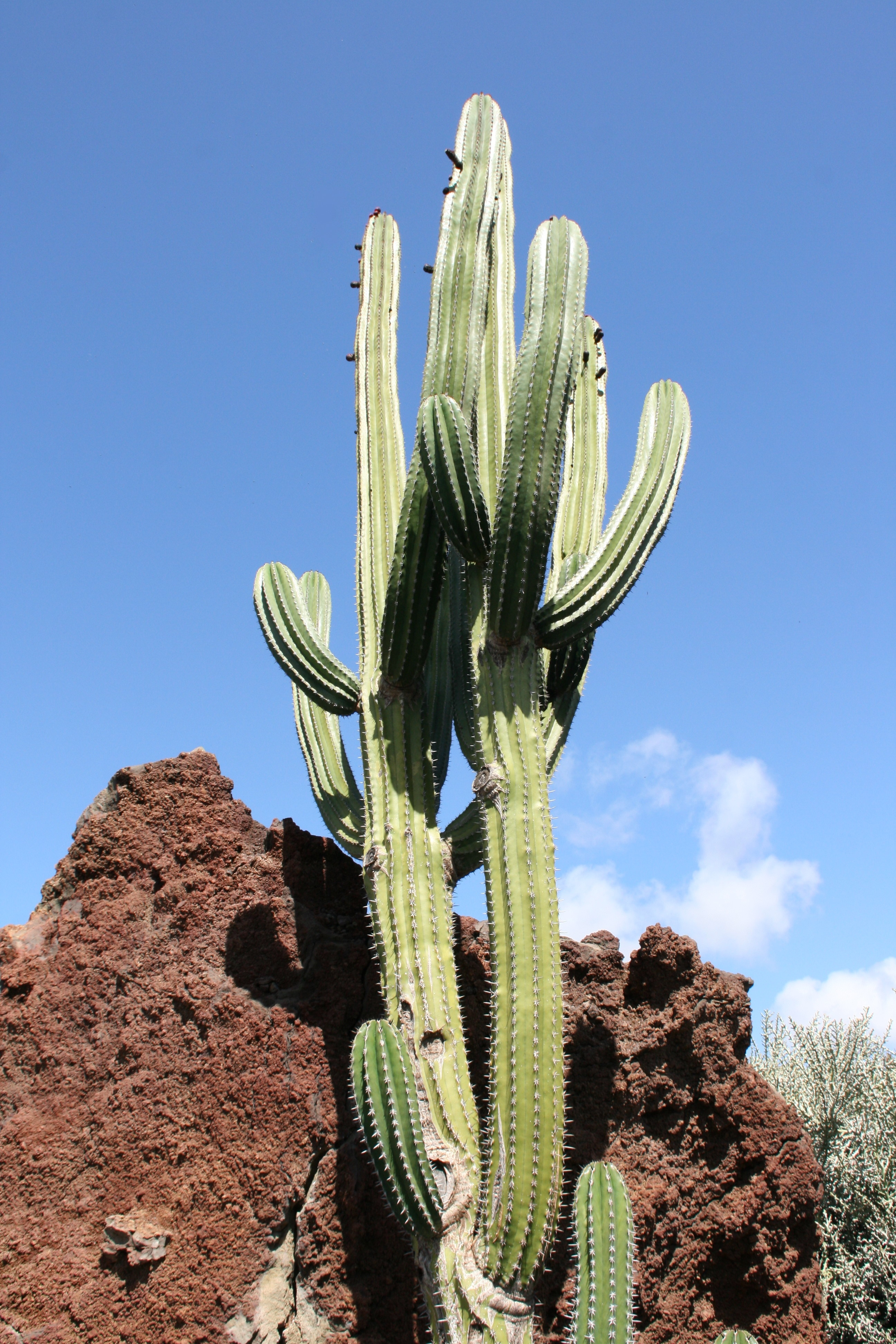

Conservation status
- Least Concern (IUCN 3.1)

Scientific classification
- Kingdom: Plantae
- Clade: Tracheophytes
- Clade: Angiosperms
- Clade: Eudicots
- Order: Caryophyllales
- Family: Cactaceae
- Subfamily: Cactoideae
- Genus: Pachycereus
- Species: P. pecten-aboriginum

Binomial name
- Pachycereus pecten-aboriginum Britton & Rose

Synonyms
- Cereus pecten-aboriginum Engelm. ex S.Watson (basionym)

= Pachycereus pecten-aboriginum =

Species of cactus

Pachycereus pecten-aboriginum (commonly known as hairbrush, Indian comb, or pitayo) is a columnar cactus plant native to Mexico. They can grow up to 15 m (49 ft) high. The trunk of this species is 1.2 to 5.0 m tall and the fruits are large and burr-like. The specific name, pecten-aboriginum, is from the Latin, and means "native combs". It was inspired by the use of the fruits as hair combs.

== Description ==
P. pecten-aboriginum is a tree up to 15 m tall with many branches. The erect or ascending branches are up to 25 cm (9.8 in) in diameter. Trunks of up to 2 meters in diameter are formed. The deep green, immature stems are up to 22 cm wide with 10 or 11 ribs. Mature stems are up to 17.5 cm wide with 10 to 12 ribs that are slightly rounded. They have a diameter of 9 to 13 cm (3.5 to 5.1 in). The areoles bear rigid, sharp, white to gray spines, that are up to 1 to 3 cm (0.39 to 1.18 in) long which may be curved on mature stems. The eight to nine radial spines are up to 1 cm (0.39 in) and greyish.

The flower is white and about 5.0 to 7.5 cm long. It opens in the evening and closes by midday. The ovary is coated in velvety brown hairs. The floral bracts are linear with long-attenuated tips covering the development of flower buds. Flowering occurs January through March.

The fruit is densely covered with long, golden yellow spines up to 6 cm long. It ripens by June and July. It splits at maturity to reveal a thin layer of firm, red, juicy pulp and shiny black seeds, each about 0.5 cm long.

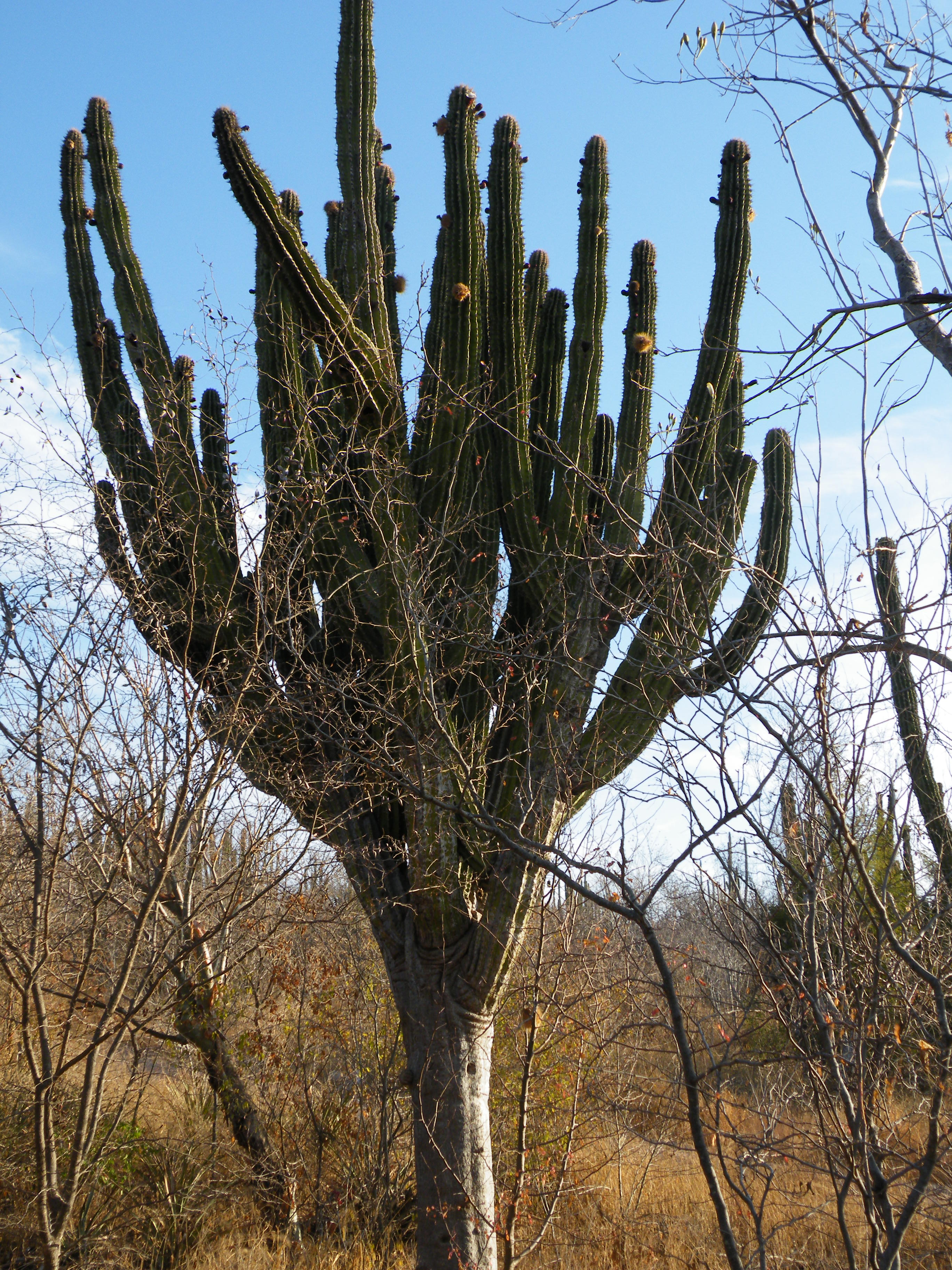
Adult plant

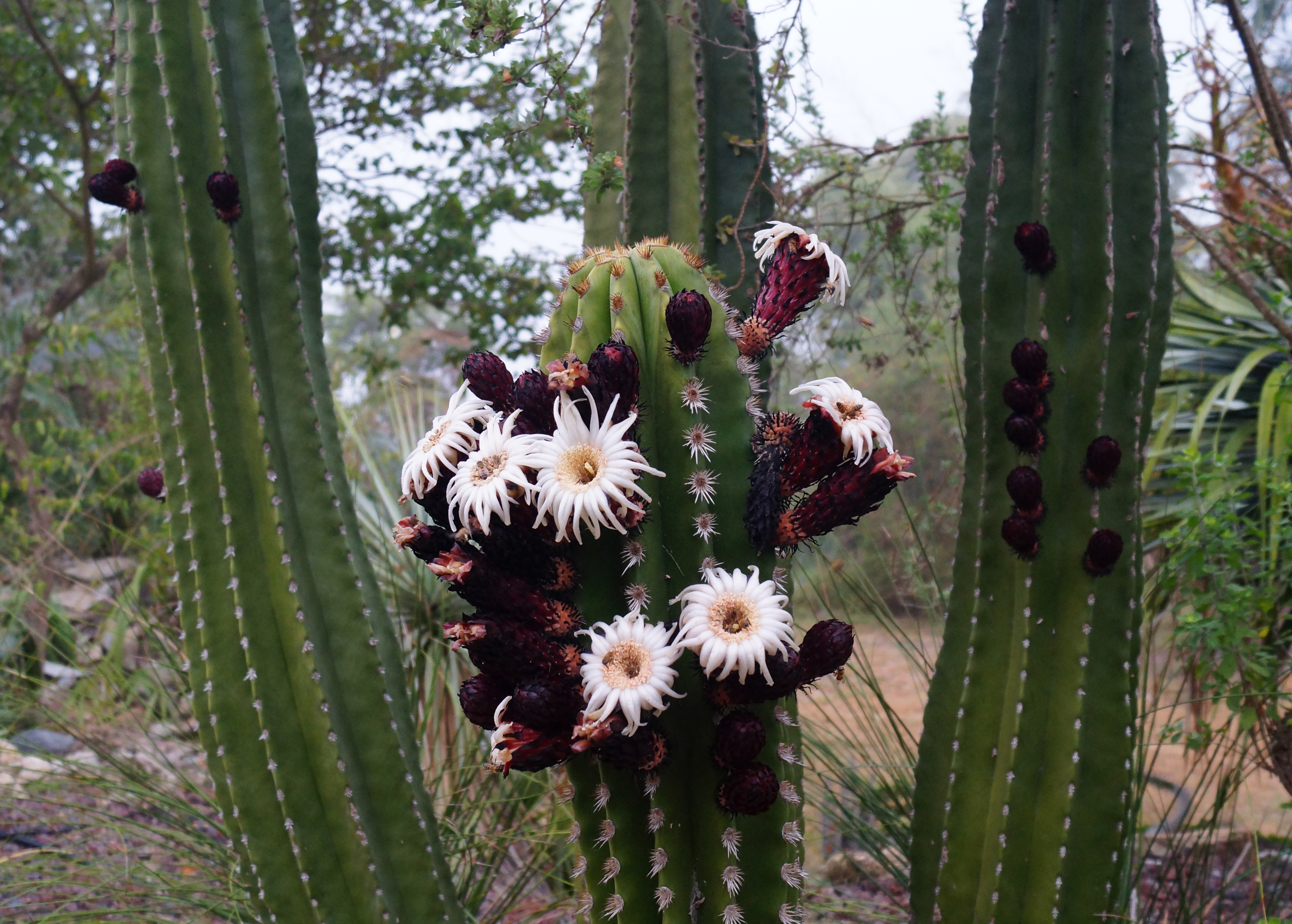
Flowers

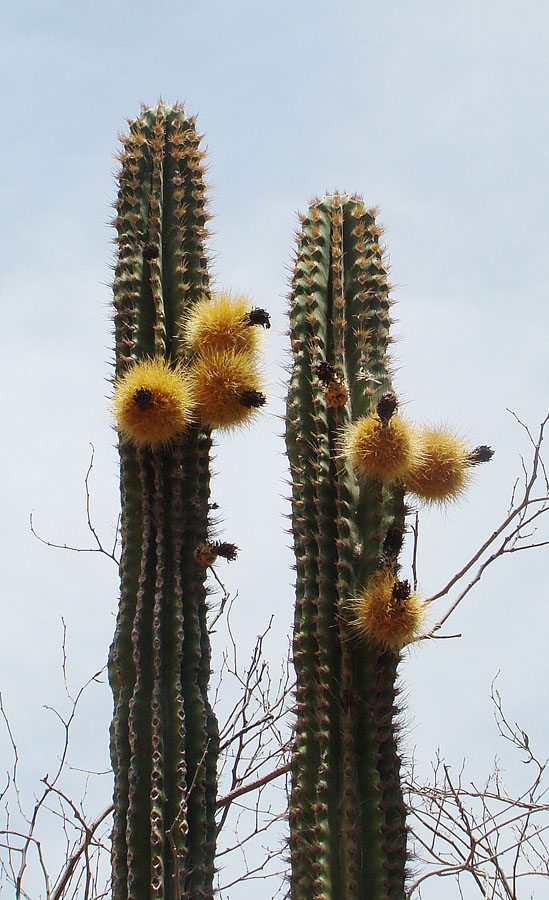
Fruits

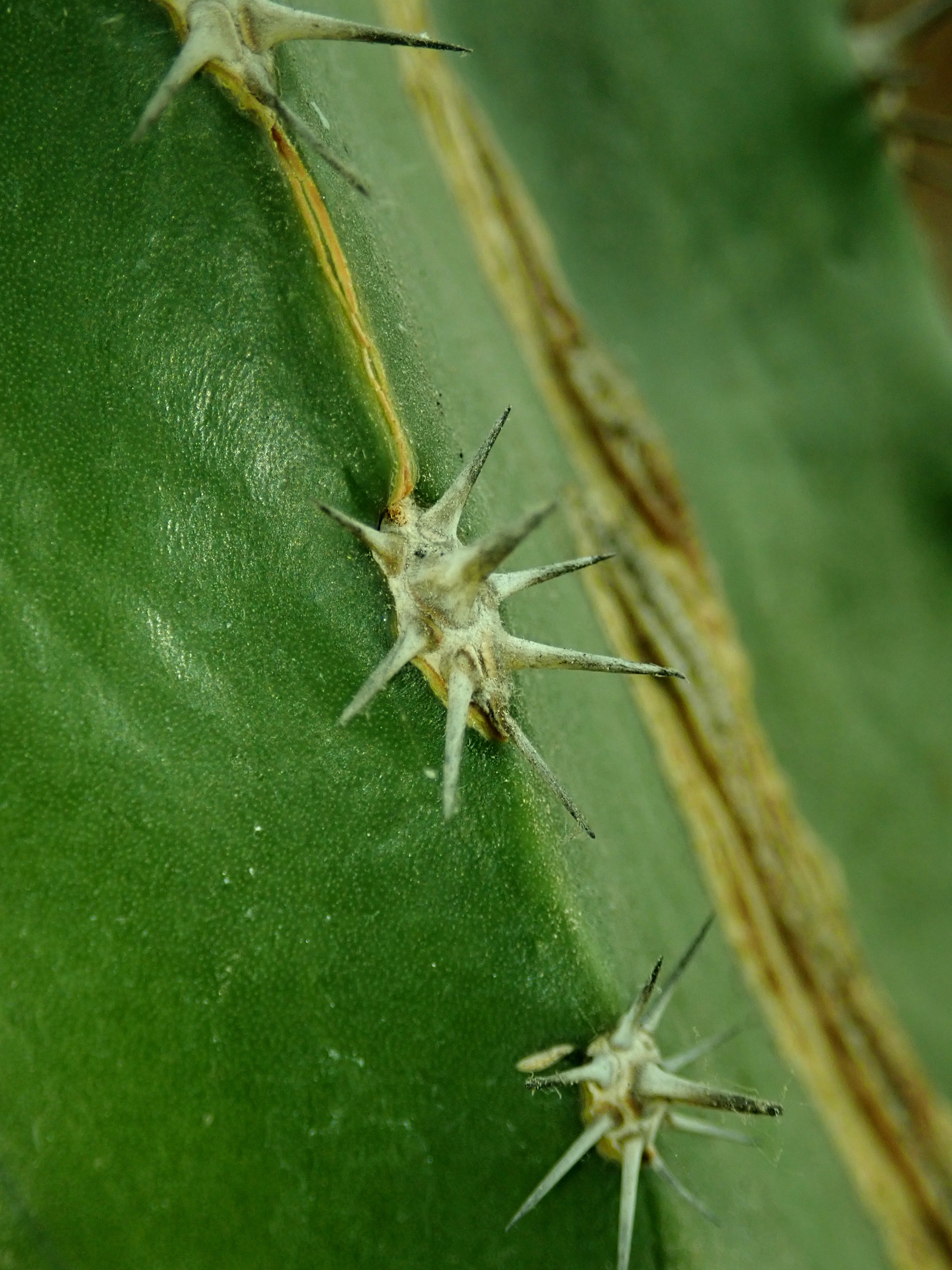
Spines

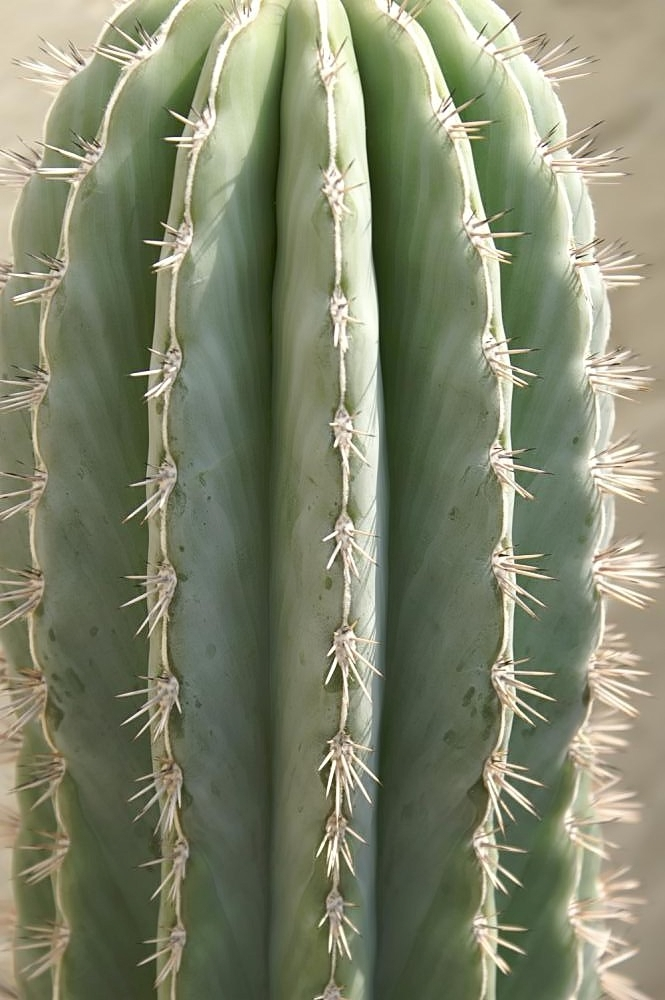
Growth

== Distribution ==
P. pecten-aboriginum is endemic to Mexico. Its range extends throughout the western states from Baja California through Sinaloa and Sonora to Chiapas. It grows in the Chihuahuan and Sonoran Deserts, the thorn forest of Sinaloa, and the southern Sonoran plains.

=== Habitat ===
P. pecten-aboriginum is found on slopes and plains, and in valleys and arroyos. Its habitat includes thorn scrubs, tropical deciduous forests, and Sonoran desert scrub. It grows on flat land and hills and in canyons. It is abundant in the subtropical scrub of southern Sonora, particularly in the foothills and lower mountains.

=== Biology ===
P. pecten-aboriginum is a diploid plant. Its floral biology differs across its range. In Tehuacán, it is pollinated at night by nectar-feeding bats. In the Sonoran desert, the flowers stay open longer in the day to attract both nocturnal and diurnal pollinators.

== Taxonomy ==
The plant was first described as Cereus pecten-aboriginum 1886 by Sereno Watson. Nathaniel Lord Britton and Joseph Nelson Rose placed them in the genus Pachycereus in 1909.

== Constituents ==
Known constituents of Pachycereus pecten-aboriginum include carnegine (pectenine), 3-hydroxy-4-methoxyphenethylamine, salsolidine, 3,4-dimethoxyphenethylamine, heliamine, N-methylheliamine, 3-methoxytyramine, arizonine, weberidine, gigantine, N-methylpachycereine, isosalsoline, salsoline, and quinic acid, among others. Mescaline does not appear to have been reported in the plant.

== Uses ==
=== Food ===
The fruit can be eaten raw or cooked, and can be made into a syrup or preserves or jam. It has been used to make wine. The Mayo people made tortillas from the ground seeds mixed with some corn meal. This so-called etcho-seed flour was used in breakfast foods such as pancakes.

=== Medicinal use ===
The Mayo used the cactus as an herbal remedy. Pieces of the flesh were applied to wounds to inhibit bleeding. The cactus flesh was cooked in salted water and the solution was applied to infected wounds three times daily, followed by a sulfathiazole powder. The juice was consumed as an herbal tonic and to treat sore throat.

=== Psychoactive use ===
Pachycereus pecten-aboriginum has been used by the Tarahuma people as a peyote substitute and to produce effects similar to those of peyote, including dizziness and "visions" or "visual hallucinations". The constituents responsible for the reported hallucinogenic effects of Pachycereus pecten-aboriginum are unknown.

=== Grooming ===
The fruits were used as combs by indigenous peoples. To make a hairbrush, the spines were removed from about two-thirds of the fruit, and the remaining spines were trimmed to about 1 cm in length.

== See also ==
- Pachycereus
- Pachycereus pringlei
- Psychoactive cactus
