= N-Methylnorsalsolinol =

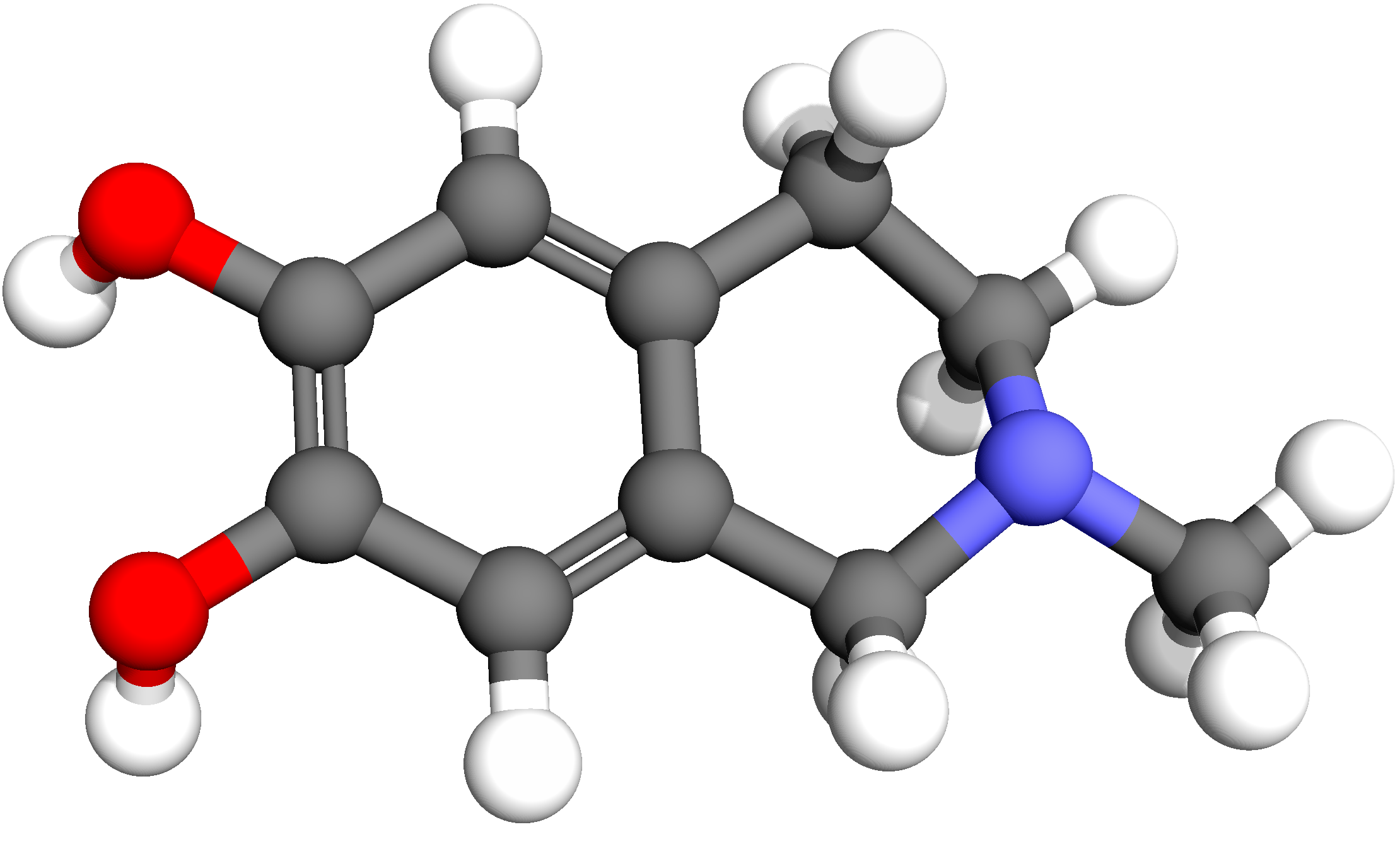

Names
- IUPAC name 2-methyl-3,4-dihydro-1H-isoquinoline-6,7-diol

Identifiers
CAS Number	37491-98-8
3D model (JSmol)	Interactive image
ChEBI	CHEBI:89546
ChEMBL	ChEMBL544714
ChemSpider	34632
ECHA InfoCard	100.161.289
EC Number	633-200-7
PubChem CID	37764
UNII	QVW3CZK8SF
CompTox Dashboard (EPA)	DTXSID70190942
- InChI: InChI=1S/C10H13NO2/c1-11-3-2-7-4-9(12)10(13)5-8(7)6-11/h4-5,12-13H,2-3,6H2,1H3 Key: WETXYFNVBDLWIW-UHFFFAOYSA-N
- SMILES: CN1CCC2=CC(=C(C=C2C1)O)O

Properties
Chemical formula	C_{10}H_{13}NO_{2}
Molar mass	179.219 g·mol^{−1}
- Except where otherwise noted, data are given for materials in their standard state (at 25 °C [77 °F], 100 kPa). Infobox references

N-Methylnorsalsolinol (NMNSAL), also known as 2-methyl-6,7-dihydroxy-1,2,3,4-tetrahydroisoquinoline (2-MDTIQ), is an endogenous dopaminergic neurotoxin, present in healthy individuals and at high levels in the cerebrospinal fluid of individuals with Parkinson's disease. Structurally, it is an isoquinolinol, which is norsalsolinol substituted with a methyl group at position 2. It can also be characterized as a rigid cyclized analogue of epinine.

The biosynthesis of the neurotoxin N-methynorsalsolinol is carried out by enzymatic condensation of dopamine into salsolinol with its subsequent methylation under the action of neutral N-methyltransferase. In rats and humans, the biosynthesis of the neurotoxin N-methylnorsalsolinol is carried out by Pictet-Spengler condensation from N-methyldopamine (epinine) and aldehydes.

N-Methylnorsalsolinol has been detected as a metabolite in humans and rodents, as it is formed in the process of side metabolism of dopamine.

== Pharmacology ==
=== Pharmacodynamics ===
N-Methylnorsalsolinol has shown high biological activity. It inhibits the tyrosine hydroxylase enzyme in vitro. It also inhibits the activity of the enzyme monoamine oxidase (In particular MAO-A), disrupting the natural breakdown of dopamine in the basal ganglia. It probably also blocks the mechanisms of transport and uptake of neurotransmitters on the membranes of nerve cells.

== See also ==
- Substituted tetrahydroisoquinoline
