= Substituted tetrahydroisoquinoline =

Class of chemical compounds

Tetrahydroisoquinoline, the parent structure of this family of compounds.

A substituted tetrahydroisoquinoline is a tetrahydroisoquinoline with one or more chemical substituents. Many simple tetrahydroisoquinoline alkaloids related to mescaline are known and occur naturally in cactus species such as peyote (Lophophora williamsii) and Pachycereus pringlei among many others. Simple tetrahydroisoquinolines may be thought of as cyclized phenethylamines. As an example, anhalinine may be thought of as a cyclized analogue of mescaline. The simple tetrahydroisoquinolines are analogous in concept to the β-carbolines and harmala alkaloids, which can be considered cyclized analogues of tryptamines.

Some of the simple tetrahydroisoquinolines, for instance pellotine, are known to be pharmacologically active, although none are known to have hallucinogenic activity. Known activities of simple tetrahydroisoquinolines include sedative and hypnotic effects, monoamine oxidase inhibition, and convulsant effects, among various others. In the 2020s, various simple tetrahydroisoquinolines, like pellotine, were identified as serotonin 5-HT_{1D} receptor ligands, serotonin 5-HT_{6} receptor partial agonists, and/or serotonin 5-HT_{7} receptor inverse agonists. These actions, such as the serotonin 5-HT_{6} and/or 5-HT_{7} receptor interactions, may be involved in the sedative and hypnotic effects of some of these compounds.

Synthetic tetrahydroisoquinoline analogues of phenethylamines, including AMPH-CR, METH-CR, PMMA-CR, DOM-CR, N-methyl-DOM-CR, DOB-CR, TDIQ (MDA-CR), and MDMTHIQ (MDMA-CR), have been developed and characterized. In general, cyclization of stimulant, entactogen, and/or psychedelic phenethylamines into the corresponding tetrahydroisoquinolines results in abolition of the defining effects of these drugs as well as loss of their affinities for monoamine transporters and serotonin 5-HT_{2} receptors. However, some of the tetrahydroisoquinoline forms, such as TDIQ, show selective affinity for α_{2}-adrenergic receptors and associated effects.

== List of simple tetrahydroisoquinolines ==
=== Simple tetrahydroisoquinoline alkaloids ===
Structure	Name	Chemical Name	PEA Counterpart (Note: With no amine substituents (e.g., methyl groups).)
	Tetrahydroisoquinoline (THIQ)	1,2,3,4-Tetrahydroisoquinoline	β-Phenethylamine
	Longimammosine	2-Methyl-6-hydroxy-THIQ	meta-Tyramine
	Longimammidine	2-Methyl-8-hydroxy-THIQ	meta-Tyramine
	Longimammatine	6-Methoxy-THIQ	3-Methoxyphenethylamine
	Weberidine	7-Methoxy-THIQ	4-Methoxyphenethylamine
	Norsalsolinol	6,7-Dihydroxy-THIQ	Dopamine
	N-Methylnorsalsolinol	2-Methyl-6,7-dihydroxy-THIQ	Dopamine
	Longimammamine	2-Methyl-4,8-dihydroxy-THIQ	meta-Octopamine
	Salsolinol	1-Methyl-6,7-dihydroxy-THIQ	Dopamine
	Salsoline	1-Methyl-6-hydroxy-7-methoxy-THIQ	3-Hydroxy-4-methoxyphenethylamine
	Isosalsoline	1-Methyl-6-methoxy-7-hydroxy-THIQ	3-Methoxytyramine
	N-Methylisosalsoline	1,2-Dimethyl-6-methoxy-7-hydroxy-THIQ	3-Methoxytyramine
	Arizonine	1-Methyl-7-methoxy-8-hydroxy-THIQ	3-Hydroxy-4-methoxyphenethylamine
	Corypalline	2-Methyl-6-methoxy-7-hydroxy-THIQ	3-Methoxytyramine
	Isocorypalline	2-Methyl-6-hydroxy-7-methoxy-THIQ	3-Hydroxy-4-methoxyphenethylamine
	Uberine	2-Methyl-5-methoxy-7-hydroxy-THIQ	2-Methoxy-4-hydroxyphenethylamine
	Hedycarine	1-(Hydroxymethyl)-2-methyl-6-methoxy-7-hydroxy-THIQ	3-Methoxytyramine
	Lophocerine	1-(2-Methylpropyl)-2-methyl-6-methoxy-7-hydroxy-THIQ	3-Methoxytyramine
	Heliamine	6,7-Dimethoxy-THIQ	3,4-Dimethoxyphenethylamine
	Salsolidine	1-Methyl-6,7-dimethoxy-THIQ	3,4-Dimethoxyphenethylamine
	N-Methylheliamine	2-Methyl-6,7-dimethoxy-THIQ	3,4-Dimethoxyphenethylamine
	Lemaireocereine	7,8-Dimethoxy-THIQ	3,4-Dimethoxyphenethylamine
	Carnegine	1,2-Dimethyl-6,7-dimethoxy-THIQ	3,4-Dimethoxyphenethylamine
	Tepenine	1,2-Dimethyl-7,8-dimethoxy-THIQ	3,4-Dimethoxyphenethylamine
	Calycotomine	1-(Hydroxymethyl)-6,7-dimethoxy-THIQ	3,4-Dimethoxyphenethylamine
	Anhalamine	6,7-Dimethoxy-8-hydroxy-THIQ	3-Desmethylmescaline
	Isoanhalamine	6-Hydroxy-7,8-dimethoxy-THIQ	3-Desmethylmescaline
	Anhalidine	2-Methyl-6,7-dimethoxy-8-hydroxy-THIQ	3-Desmethylmescaline
	Isoanhalidine	2-Methyl-6-hydroxy-7,8-dimethoxy-THIQ	3-Desmethylmescaline
	Anhalonidine	1-Methyl-6,7-dimethoxy-8-hydroxy-THIQ	3-Desmethylmescaline
	Isoanhalonidine	1-Methyl-6-hydroxy-7,8-dimethoxy-THIQ	3-Desmethylmescaline
	Pellotine	1,2-Dimethyl-6,7-dimethoxy-8-hydroxy-THIQ	3-Desmethylmescaline
	Peyotine	1,2,2-Trimethyl-6,7-dimethoxy-8-hydroxy-THIQ	3-Desmethylmescaline
	Isopellotine	1,2-Dimethyl-6-hydroxy-7,8-dimethoxy-THIQ	3-Desmethylmescaline
	Gigantine	1,2-Dimethyl-5-hydroxy-6,7-dimethoxy-THIQ	2-Hydroxy-3,4-dimethoxyphenethylamine
	Deglucopterocereine	1-(Hydroxymethyl)-2-methyl-5-hydroxy-6,7-dimethoxy-THIQ	2-Hydroxy-3,4-dimethoxyphenethylamine
	Anhalinine	6,7,8-Trimethoxy-THIQ	Mescaline
	N-Methylanhalinine	2-Methyl-6,7,8-trimethoxy-THIQ	Mescaline
	O-Methylanhalonidine	1-Methyl-6,7,8-trimethoxy-THIQ	Mescaline
	O-Methylpellotine	1,2-Dimethyl-6,7,8-trimethoxy-THIQ	Mescaline
	Nortehaunine	5,6,7-Trimethoxy-THIQ	Isomescaline
	Tehaunine	2-Methyl-5,6,7-trimethoxy-THIQ	Isomescaline
	Hydrocotarnine	2-Methyl-6,7-methylenedioxy-8-methoxy-THIQ	Lophophine
	Anhalonine	1-Methyl-6-methoxy-7,8-methylenedioxy-THIQ	Lophophine
	Anhalotine	2,2-Dimethyl-6,7-dimethoxy-8-hydroxy-THIQ	3-Desmethylmescaline
	Lophophorine	1,2-Dimethyl-6-methoxy-7,8-methylenedioxy-THIQ	Lophophine
	Lophotine	1,2,2-Trimethyl-6-Methoxy-7,8-methylenedioxy-THIQ	Lophophine
	Peyophorine	1-Methyl-2-ethyl-6-methoxy-7,8-methylenedioxy-THIQ	Lophophine
	Norweberine	5,6,7,8-Tetramethoxy-THIQ	2,3,4,5-Tetramethoxyphenethylamine
	Weberine	2-Methyl-5,6,7,8-tetramethoxy-THIQ	2,3,4,5-Tetramethoxyphenethylamine
	Pachycereine	1-Methyl-5,6,7,8-tetramethoxy-THIQ	2,3,4,5-Tetramethoxyphenethylamine
	Tehaunine N-oxide	2-Methyl-2-oxo-5,6,7-trimethoxy-THIQ	Isomescaline

=== Synthetic simple tetrahydroisoquinolines ===
Structure	Name	Chemical Name	AMPH Counterpart
	Tetrahydroisoquinoline (THIQ; AMPH-CR)	1,2,3,4-Tetrahydroisoquinoline	Amphetamine
	N-Methyl-THIQ (METH-CR)	2-Methyl-THIQ	Methamphetamine
	PMMA-CR	2-Methyl-7-methoxy-THIQ	para-Methoxymethamphetamine (PMMA)
	DOM-CR	5,8-Dimethoxy-7-methyl-THIQ	2,5-Dimethoxy-4-methylamphetamine (DOM)
	DOB-CR	5,8-Dimethoxy-7-bromo-THIQ	2,5-Dimethoxy-4-bromoamphetamine (DOB)
	N-Methyl-DOM-CR	2,7-Dimethyl-5,8-dimethoxy-THIQ	Beatrice (N-methyl-DOM)
	TDIQ (MDTHIQ, MDA-CR)	6,7-Methylenedioxy-THIQ	3,4-Methylenedioxyamphetamine (MDA)
	Hydrohydrastinine (MDMTHIQ, MDMA-CR)	2-Methyl-6,7-methylenedioxy-THIQ	3,4-Methylenedioxymethamphetamine (MDMA)
	Hydrastinine	1-Hydroxy-2-methyl-6,7-methylenedioxy-THIQ	3,4-Methylenedioxymethamphetamine (MDMA)
	3Me6,7MDTIQ	3-Methyl-6,7-methylenedioxy-THIQ	3,4-Methylenedioxyamphetamine (MDA)
	Esproquin	2-(3-Ethylsulfinylpropyl)-THIQ	–

== See also ==
- The Simple Plant Isoquinolines (2002)
- Substituted phenethylamine
- Substituted 3-benzazepine
- Substituted β-carboline and harmala alkaloid
- Iboga-type alkaloid and ibogalog
- A-69024
- Metofoline
