= C13H19NO3 =

The molecular formula C_{13}H_{19}NO_{3} (molar mass: 237.29 g/mol) may refer to:

- Allylescaline
- Cycloproscaline
- 2,5-Dimethoxy-4-acetylamphetamine
- Gigantine
- Jimscaline
- O-Methylanhalonidine
- N-Methylanhalinine
- Methylenedioxymethoxyethylamphetamine
- MTDA
- Pellotine
- Tehaunine
- Viloxazine
