= Lemaireocereine =

Names
- IUPAC name 7,8-dimethoxy-1,2,3,4-tetrahydroisoquinoline
- Other names 7,8-Dimethoxy-THIQ

Identifiers
CAS Number	52759-08-7; hydrochloride: 15365-56-7
3D model (JSmol)	Interactive image
ChemSpider	156332; hydrochloride: 16738064
EC Number	824-864-0
PubChem CID	179606
CompTox Dashboard (EPA)	DTXSID40967204
- InChI: InChI=1S/C11H15NO2/c1-13-10-4-3-8-5-6-12-7-9(8)11(10)14-2/h3-4,12H,5-7H2,1-2H3 Key: MDRWFICNTMXXQK-UHFFFAOYSA-N
- SMILES: COC1=C(C2=C(CCNC2)C=C1)OC

Properties
Chemical formula	C_{11}H_{15}NO_{2}
Molar mass	193.246 g·mol^{−1}
- Except where otherwise noted, data are given for materials in their standard state (at 25 °C [77 °F], 100 kPa). Infobox references

Lemaireocereine, also known as 7,8-dimethoxy-1,2,3,4-tetrahydroisoquinoline, is a tetrahydroisoquinoline and cyclized phenethylamine alkaloid found in Pachycereus pringlei and other cacti.

== See also ==
- Substituted tetrahydroisoquinoline
- 3,4-Dimethoxyphenethylamine
- Pachycereus pringlei § Constituents and effects
