= DOB-CR =

Clinical data
- Other names: DOB/CR; "DOB-Conformationally Restrained"; 5,8-Dimethoxy-7-bromo-THIQ; 7-Bromo-5,8-dimethoxy-THIQ; DOB-THIQ; DOB/THIQ
- Drug class: Serotonin receptor modulator
- ATC code: None

Identifiers
- IUPAC name: 7-bromo-5,8-dimethoxy-1,2,3,4-tetrahydroisoquinoline
- CAS Number: 183429-24-5
- PubChem CID: 9838353
- ChemSpider: 8014073

Chemical and physical data
- Formula: C_{11}H_{14}BrNO_{2}
- Molar mass: 272.142 g·mol^{−1}
- 3D model (JSmol): Interactive image
- SMILES: COC1=CC(=C(C2=C1CCNC2)OC)Br
- InChI: InChI=1S/C11H14BrNO2/c1-14-10-5-9(12)11(15-2)8-6-13-4-3-7(8)10/h5,13H,3-4,6H2,1-2H3; Key:YDHKNGFINXQAKM-UHFFFAOYSA-N

DOB-CR, or DOB/CR, an acronym of "DOB-conformationally restrained", also known as 7-bromo-5,8-dimethoxy-1,2,3,4-tetrahydroisoquinoline, is a serotonin receptor modulator of the tetrahydroisoquinoline family. It is a cyclized phenethylamine and a derivative of the psychedelic drugs 2C-B and DOB in which the side chain has been cyclized with the benzene ring to form a tetrahydroisoquinoline (THIQ) ring system.

== Pharmacology ==
The drug shows modest affinity for the serotonin 5-HT_{2A} receptor. Its affinity (K_{i}) for the receptor was 242 to 250 nM, which is about 6-fold lower than that of DOB. In contrast to DOB, DOB-CR completely failed to substitute for DOM in rodent drug discrimination tests. In addition, behavioral disruption occurred at higher doses. These findings suggest that DOB-CR would lack psychedelic effects in humans. The drug also failed to substitute for dextroamphetamine and MDMA in rodent drug discrimination tests, suggesting lack of stimulant or entactogenic effects as well. However, DOB-CR fully substituted for the structurally related selective α_{2}-adrenergic receptor ligand TDIQ (MDTHIQ or MDA-CR), albeit with about 4-fold lower potency than TDIQ itself.

== History ==
DOB-CR was first described in the scientific literature by Richard Glennon and colleagues by 1996.

== See also ==
- Substituted tetrahydroisoquinoline
- Cyclized phenethylamine
- DOM-CR
- TDIQ (MDTHIQ or MDA-CR)
- Tetrahydroisoquinoline (THIQ; AMPH-CR)
