= Salsoline =

- (±)-Salsoline

Names
- IUPAC name 6-Hydroxy-7-methoxy-1-methyl-1,2,3,4-tetrahydroisoquinoline

Identifiers
CAS Number	(±): 76419-97-1; (R)-(+): 101467-40-7; (S)-(–): 89-31-6
3D model (JSmol)	(±): Interactive image; (S)-(–): Interactive image
ChEBI	(±): CHEBI:110170; (S)-(–): CHEBI:112
ChEMBL	(±): ChEMBL1532461; (R)-(+): ChEMBL1192723; (S)-(–): ChEMBL1187592
ChemSpider	(±): 42492; (R)-(+): 390808; (S)-(–): 36574
EC Number	(±): 675-342-2; (S)-(–): 201-897-3
KEGG	(S)-(–): C09640
PubChem CID	(±): 46695; (R)-(+): 40010; (S)-(–): 442356
UNII	(R)-(+): 9Q83ETU10C; (S)-(–): T246JT0V8K
CompTox Dashboard (EPA)	(±): DTXSID80871573; (R)-(+): DTXSID70876517
- InChI: (S)-(–): InChI=1S/C11H15NO2/c1-7-9-6-11(14-2)10(13)5-8(9)3-4-12-7/h5-7,12-13H,3-4H2,1-2H3
- SMILES: (±): CC1C2=CC(=C(C=C2CCN1)O)OC; (S)-(–): C[C@H]1NCCC2=CC(O)=C(C=C12)OC

Properties
Chemical formula	C_{11}H_{15}NO_{2}
Molar mass	193.246 g·mol^{−1}
Appearance	White or almost white crystalline powder
Density	1.106 g/cm^{3}
Melting point	217-219 °C
Solubility	Soluble in chloroform; slightly soluble in water, benzene

Hazards
- Occupational safety and health (OHS/OSH)
Main hazards	May cause allergic reaction. Avoid contact with eyes: May cause eye irritation; May cause allergic reaction. May cause skin irritation; May be harmful if swallowed; May cause irritation of respiratory tract
Flash point	157.4 °C (315.3 °F; 430.5 K)
- Except where otherwise noted, data are given for materials in their standard state (at 25 °C [77 °F], 100 kPa). Infobox references

Salsoline is a tetrahydroisoquinoline alkaloid found in some plants of the genus Salsola. Salsoline is the monomethylated metabolite of salsolinol which has been thought to contribute to Parkinson's disease. Also, this has been tied to the neuropathology of chronic alcoholism.

== Related compounds ==
Some examples of compounds that are similar to salsoline include salsolinol, isosalsoline, norsalsolinol, and carboxysalsolinol.

== Reactions ==
These types of compounds are able to undergo addition reactions in which additions can happen to the nitrogenous ring. Also, it is possible for the ring to break open. In the presence of NaBH_{4} or H_{2}SO_{4}, this structure may be able to undergo carbonyl chemistry, if present, and other reactions, such as substitution. Salsoline is a derivative of dopamine, meaning it is able to function in the brain like dopamine.

== Medicine ==
Salsoline has been detected in areas of the brain that are highest in concentration with dopamine. It has been found in the frontal cortex, basal ganglia, and hypothalamus. However, there are two enantiomers, (R) and (S), and are not treated similarly in this case. The (R) and (S) enantiomers are abundant in human plasma, but these configurations are recognized by different machinery in the cell. Parkinson's disease is a neurotoxic disease in which the concentration of this compound is significantly increased in the cerebrospinal fluid. Therefore, the patients who are diagnosed with Parkinson's disease are likely found to have had these derivatives present.

In lab, it has become increasingly popular to try and protect the neurons from such an environment. The derivative is able to be synthesized in areas of the brain, and it is possible to now try and target these areas to influence against the build up of these toxins. Studies have shown that high levels of salsoline increase concentrations of cerebrospinal fluid in alcoholic patients. It has been noted that there has been a build up of salsoline in fluid in the case of Parkinson's Disease. There are several sources that have pointed toward the conclusion that salsoline has been linked with alcoholism and intoxication.

== See also ==
- Substituted tetrahydroisoquinoline
