= C10H14BrNO2 =

The molecular formula C_{10}H_{14}BrNO_{2} (molar mass : 260.131 g/mol) may refer to:

- 4-Bromomescaline
- 2C-B
- 6-Br-DMPEA
