= C14H21NOS =

The molecular formula C_{14}H_{21}NOS may refer to:

- Esproquin
- Prosulfocarb
