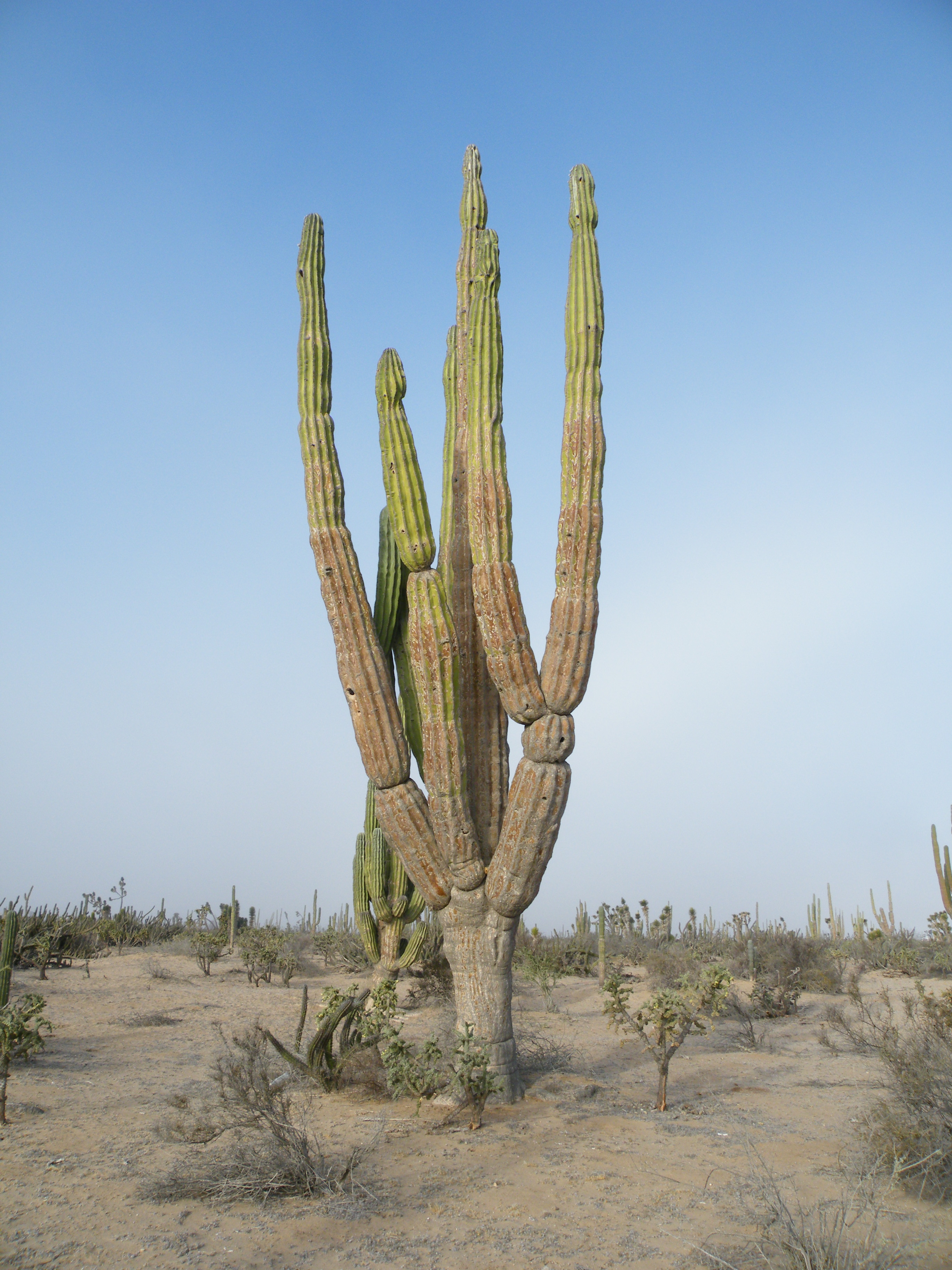
- Pachycereus pringlei in Viscaino, Baja California Sur, Mexico

Conservation status
- Least Concern (IUCN 3.1)

Scientific classification
- Kingdom: Plantae
- Clade: Tracheophytes
- Clade: Angiosperms
- Clade: Eudicots
- Order: Caryophyllales
- Family: Cactaceae
- Subfamily: Cactoideae
- Genus: Pachycereus
- Species: P. pringlei

Binomial name
- Pachycereus pringlei (S.Watson) Britton & Rose

Synonyms
- Cereus pringlei S.Watson

= Pachycereus pringlei =

Species of cactus

Pachycereus pringlei (also known as Mexican giant cardon or elephant cactus) is a species of large cactus native to northwestern Mexico, in the states of Baja California, Baja California Sur, and Sonora. It is commonly known as cardón, a name derived from the Spanish word cardo, meaning "thistle"; additionally, it is often referred to as sabueso (or "bloodhound"), which is possibly an early Spanish colonialist interpretation of the Seri word for the plant, xaasj.

Large stands of this cactus still exist, but many have been destroyed as land has been cleared for cultivation in Sonora.

Climate change will likely affect the future distribution of numerous plant species, including Pachycereus pringlei, which can be attributed to alterations in precipitation and temperature.

The cactus fruits were always an important food for the Seri people, in Sonora; the dried cactus columns themselves could be used for construction purposes, as well as for firewood.

The cactus thrives in barren landscapes thanks to a remarkable symbiotic relationship with a biofilm that forms on its roots. This biofilm enables the cactus to colonize bare rock, even in the absence of soil. This makes this species an opportunistic lithophyte. The root's bacterial colonies can fix nitrogen from the air and break down the rock to expose hidden sources of nutrients. The cactus has evolved to maintain cultures of the symbiotic bacteria within its dormant seeds.

== Morphology ==
A cardon specimen is the tallest living cactus in the world, with a maximum recorded height of 19.2 m (63 ft 0 in), with a stout trunk up to 1 m (3 ft 3 in) in diameter bearing several erect branches. In overall appearance, it resembles the related saguaro (Carnegiea gigantea), but differs in being more heavily branched and having branching nearer the base of the stem, fewer ribs on the stems, blossoms located lower along the stem, differences in areoles and spination, and spinier fruit.

The flowers are white, large, nocturnal opening, and appear along the ribs as opposed to only apices of the stems.

== Lifespan and growth ==
An average mature cardon may reach a height of 10 metres (30 ft), but individuals as tall as 18 metres (60 ft) are known. It is a slow-growing plant with a lifespan measured in hundreds of years. One way scientists have aged these cacti has been to use radiocarbon dating to test the spines closest to the ground. Growth can be significantly enhanced by inoculation with the bacteria Azospirillum. Most adult cardon have several side branches that may be as massive as the trunk. The resulting tree may attain a weight of 25 tons.

== Constituents and effects ==
Pachycereus pringlei has psychedelic effects and appears to have been used by ancient people in Baja California, Mexico, as an entheogen and for various other uses. This was discovered by businessman Earl Crockett, who contacted and informed Alexander Shulgin about his findings. Shulgin further evaluated Pachycereus pringlei, including self-experimentation and analytical characterization. He has described it as a "mild psychedelic" and as "very definitely psychedelic, a little bit on the light side". In 2001, a group of twelve people, including Alexander and Ann Shulgin, bioassayed the cactus. Half of them had a "good", "pleasant", or "marvelous" but otherwise "unremarkable" psychedelic experience, while the other half became "violently ill" or "viciously poisoned". The effects included visuals, dysphoria or anxiety, heavy body load, diarrhea, and, in the case of Alexander Shulgin, an overwhelming fear of moving. Ann Shulgin is said to have had an even more severe reaction, stating that she "could see the full moon shining down on me with what felt like chilling contempt" and thinking to herself "What an awful, stupid way to die". Alexander Shulgin said that he was unable to figure out why half the group became sick and the other half did not. His efforts to complete his research on the cactus were hampered by difficulty in finding people willing to consume it due to its serious adverse effects in many people.

In contrast to other psychedelic cacti, Pachycereus pringlei does not contain mescaline. However, a number of mescaline-related constituents have been identified in the cactus, including the phenethylamines 3,4-dimethoxyphenethylamine (not rigidly proven) and N-methylmescaline as well as the tetrahydroisoquinolines and cyclized phenethylamines heliamine, N-methylheliamine, tehaunine, tehaunine N-oxide, lemaireocereine, weberine, and carnegine. When Shulgin started investigating Pachycereus pringlei, five compounds in it had already been identified (possibly referring to heliamine, tehaunine, tehaunine N-oxide, lemaireocereine, and weberine), and Shulgin stated that he had seen mass spectrometry for an additional 18 compounds. Some of the additional compounds, like N-methylmescaline, were subsequently researched by Keeper Trout.

Some of the tetrahydroisoquinoline constituents that Shulgin assessed, like carnegine, have been identified as potent monoamine oxidase inhibitors (MAOIs). According to Shulgin, N-methylmescaline, in combination with MAOIs also present in the cactus that allow N-methylmescaline to become orally active, may be the active psychedelic constituent. This has led to Pachycereus pringlei being dubbed by Shulgin as "cactahuasca" (or spelled "cactihuasca" or "cactohuasca"), as it would be analogous to ayahuasca, a combination of the monoamine oxidase (MAO)-metabolized and normally orally-inactive psychedelic dimethyltryptamine (DMT) with MAOI harmala alkaloids that allow for oral activity. In any case, Shulgin's hypothesis of Pachycereus pringlei's psychedelic activity remains unconfirmed, and the active constituents have yet to be fully resolved. It has been noted that N-methylation of psychedelic phenethylamines, for instance the cases of Beatrice (N-methyl-DOM) and methyl-DOB (N-methyl-DOB), has invariably greatly reduced or eliminated their hallucinogenic activity. On the other hand, trichocereine (N,N-dimethylmescaline) has been reported to be psychedelic, although these findings are conflicting and controversial. In addition, methyl-TMA (N-methyl-TMA) and N-methyl-DOET are known to be psychedelic at sufficiently high doses. No naturally occurring tetrahydroisoquinolines are definitely known to be hallucinogenic in humans. Synthetic tetrahydroisoquinoline analogues of potent phenethylamine psychedelics, for instance DOM-CR (a cyclized analogue of DOM) and DOB-CR (a cyclized analogue of DOB), show loss of hallucinogen-like effects in animals.

Some of the alkaloids in Pachycereus pringlei, like carnegine, are known to be neurotoxic in laboratory animals.

== Gallery ==
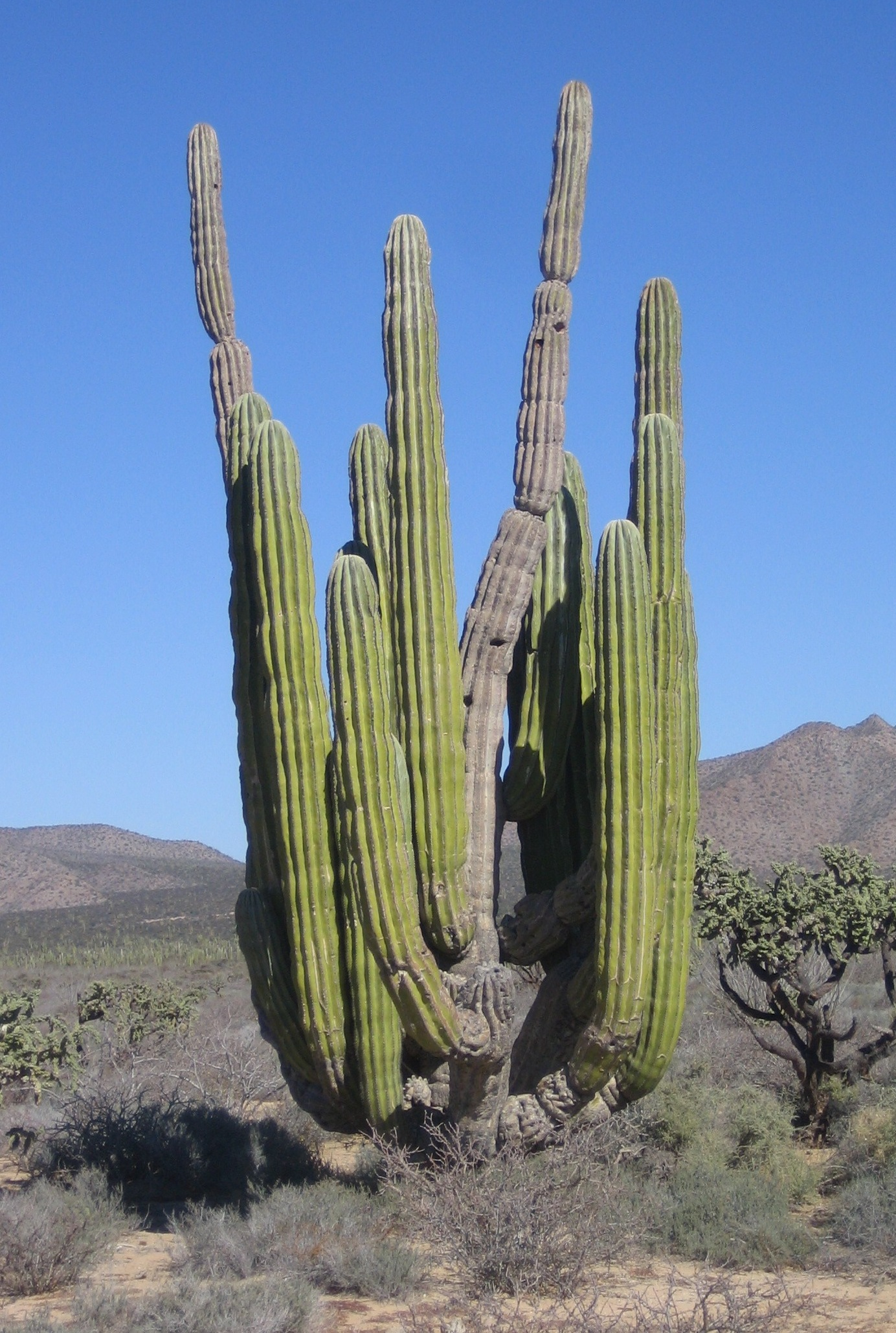
Habit

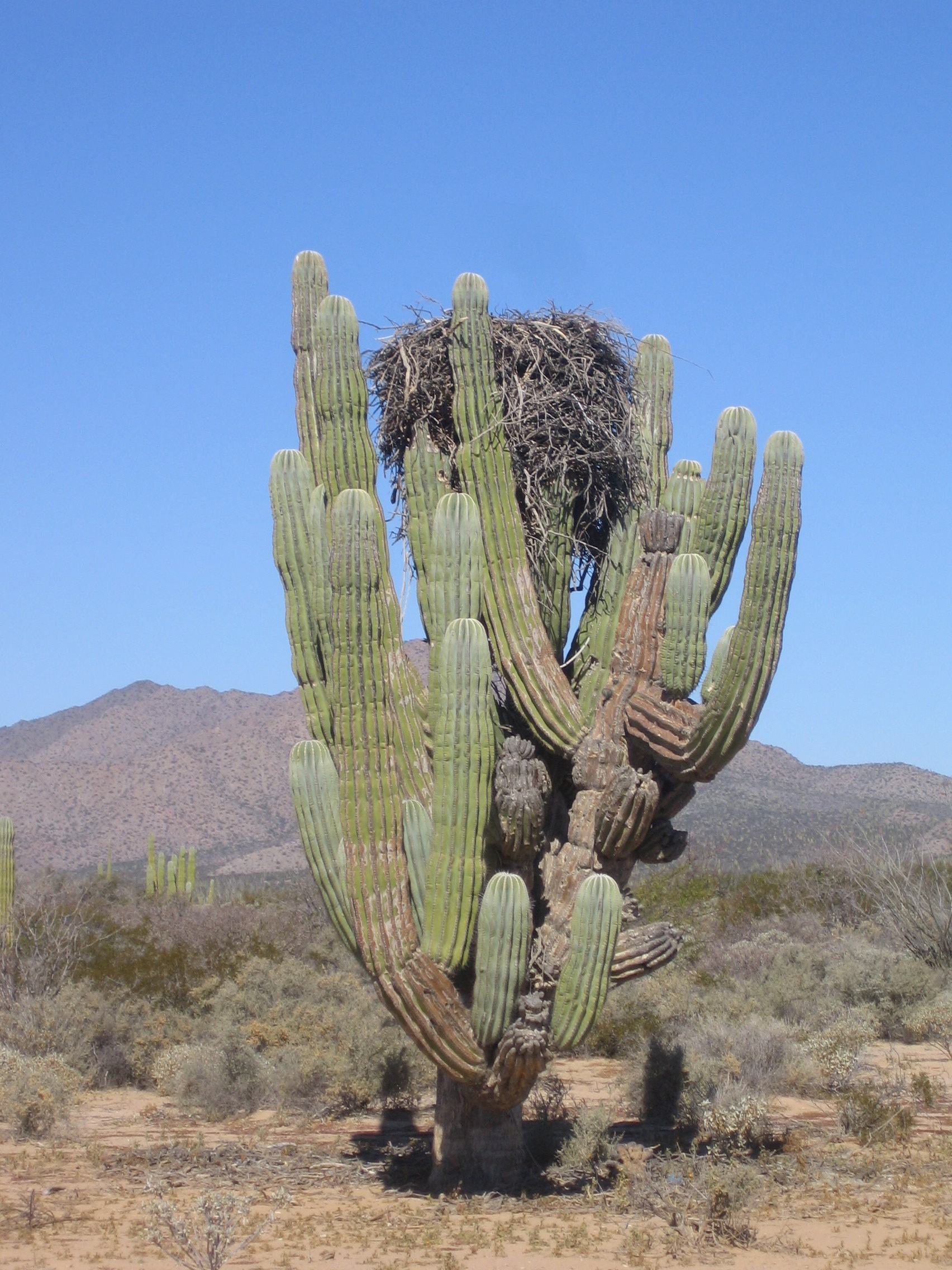
With an osprey nest atop

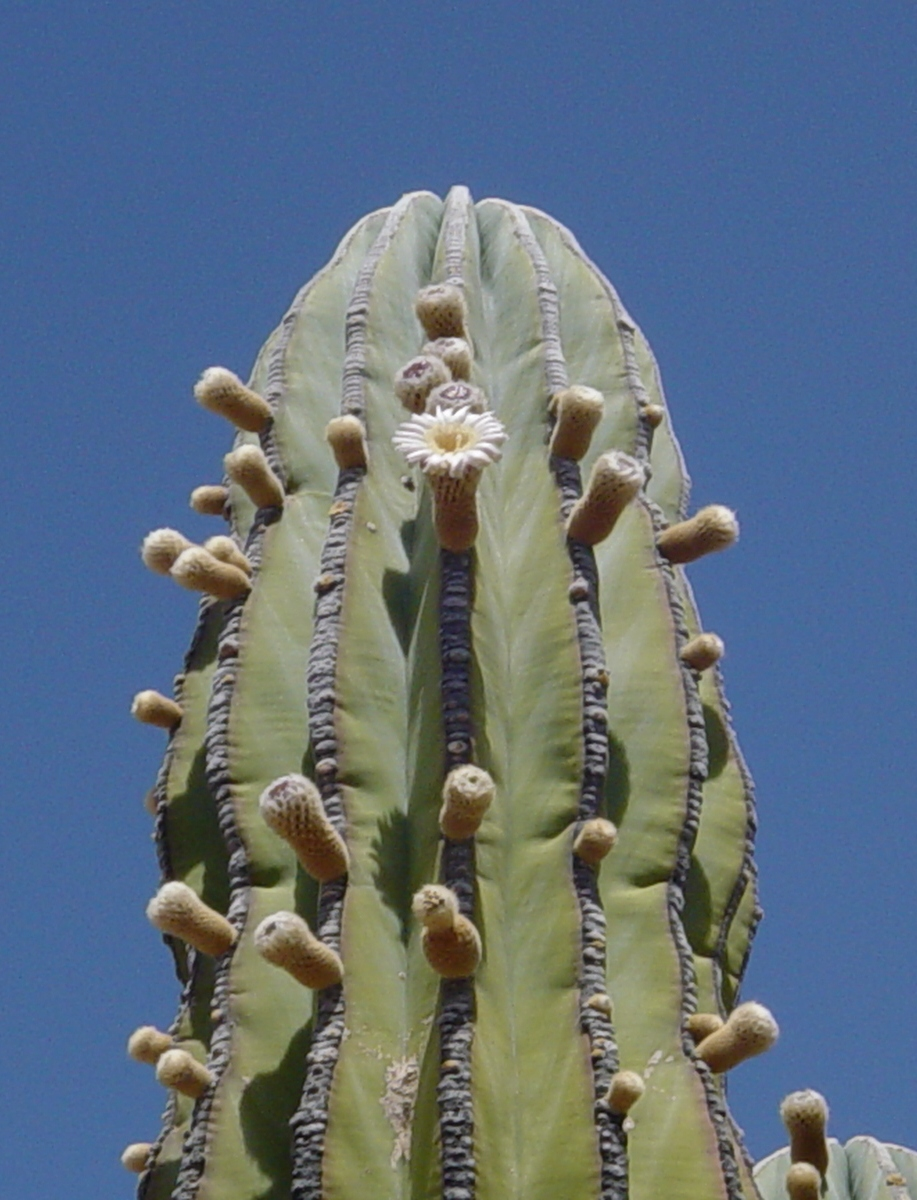
Flowering

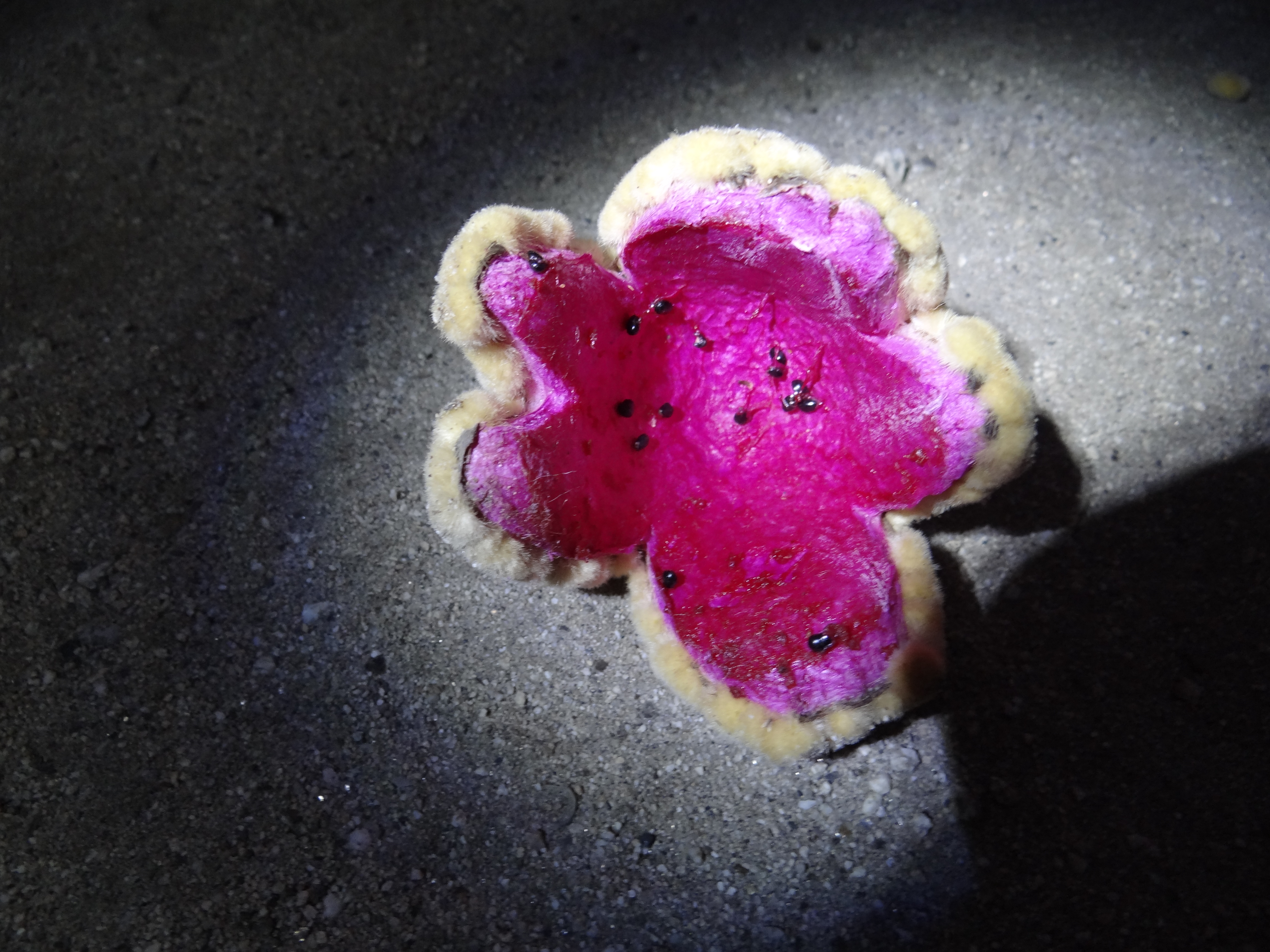
Husk of a fallen fruit

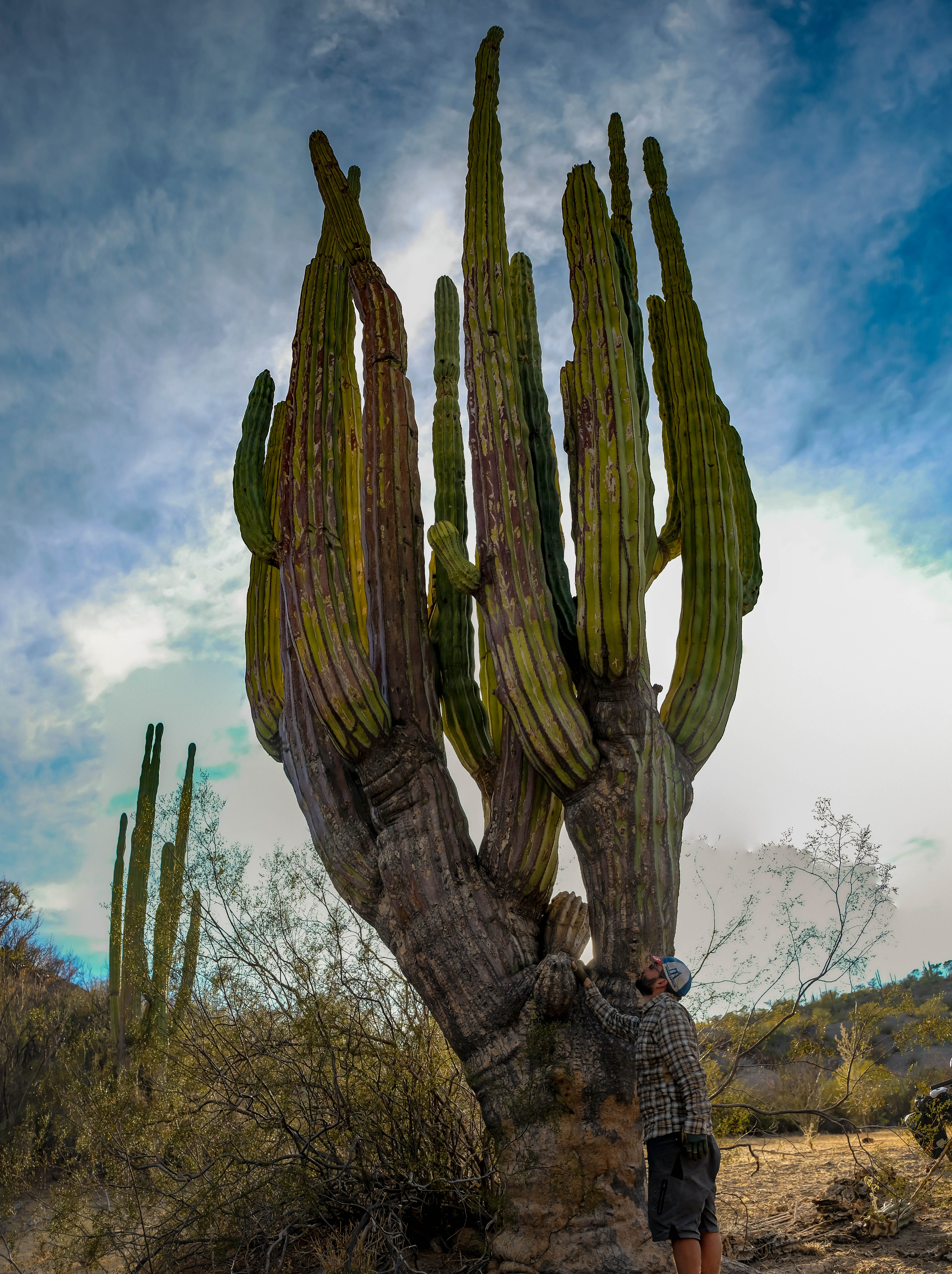
With human for scale

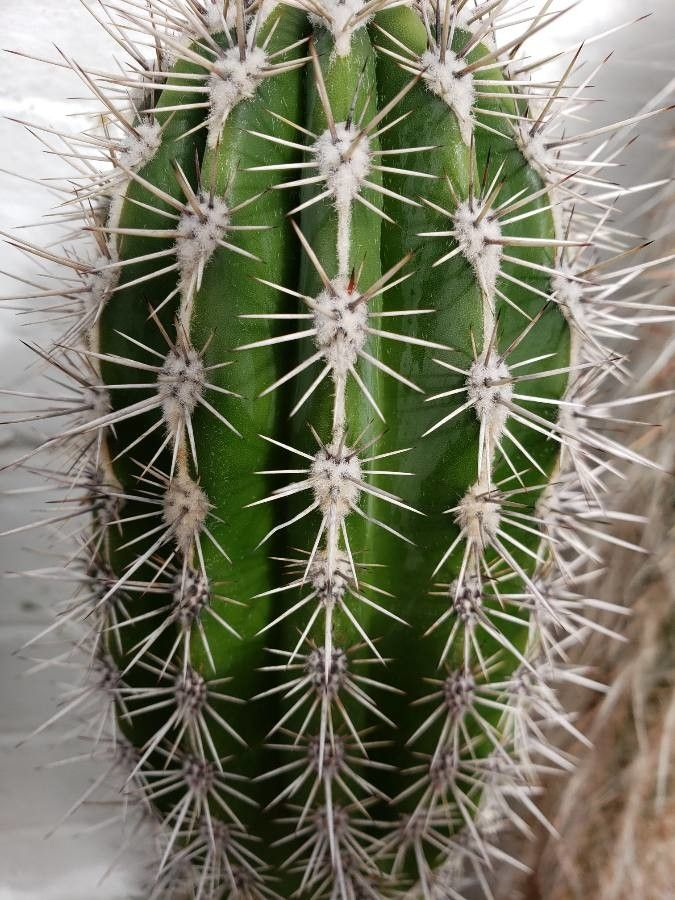
Spines

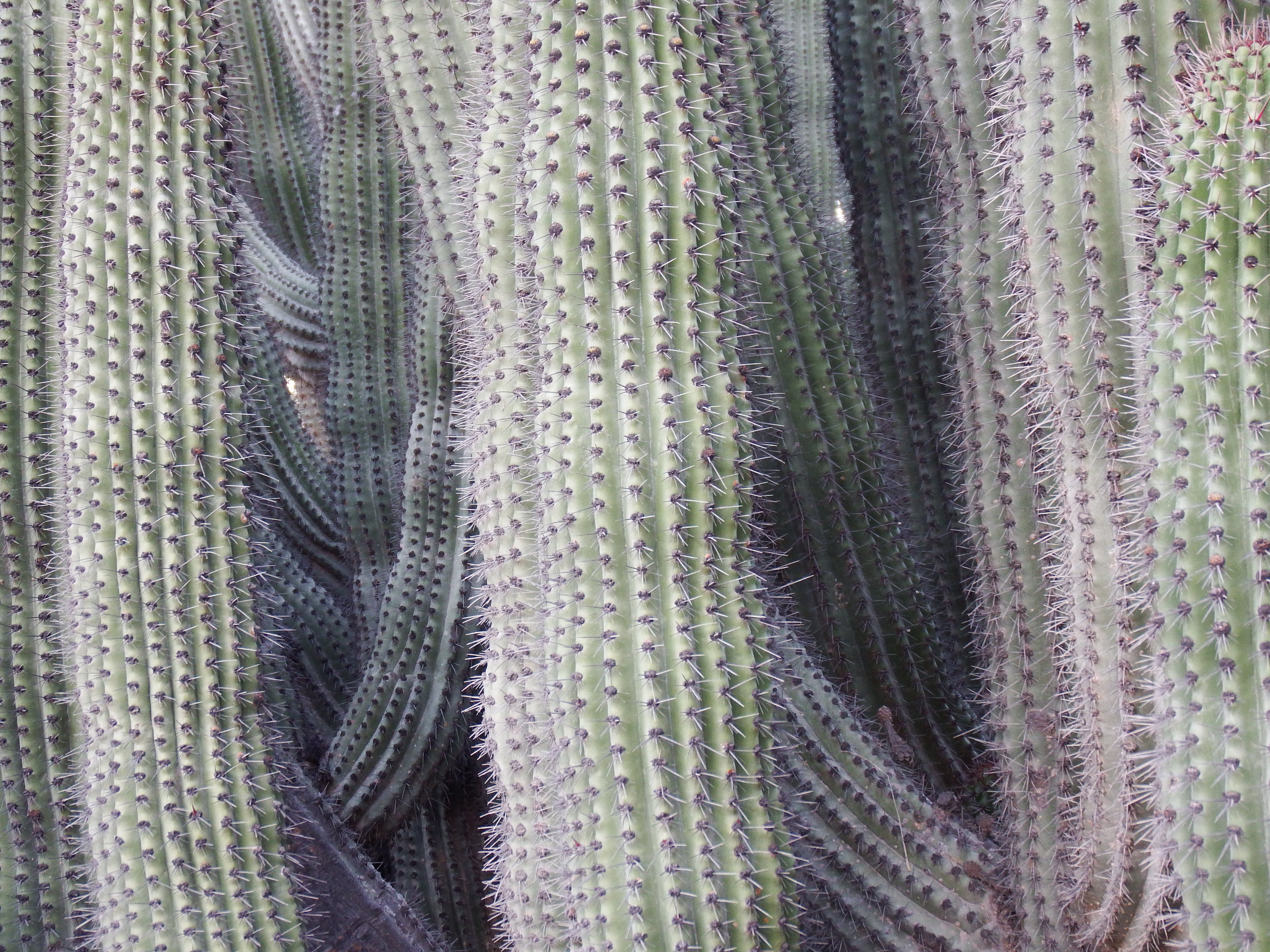
Close up of a single plant

== Notes ==
1.The tallest living cactus is a specimen of Pachycereus pringlei. The tallest cactus ever measured was an armless Saguaro cactus which blew over in a windstorm in 1986; it was 23.8 meters (78 feet) tall.
