= DMMM =

DMMM may refer to:

- DMMM-4, an alkaloid otherwise known as carnegine
- Dark Messiah of Might and Magic, an action role-playing game
- Daughters of Mary, Mother of Mercy, a Catholic religious institute founded in Nigeria
