= C13H19NO4 =

The molecular formula C_{13}H_{19}NO_{4} (molar mass: 253.29 g/mol, exact mass: 253.1314 u) may refer to:

- N-Acetylmescaline
- Tehaunine N-oxide
