= Heliamine =

Names
- IUPAC name 6,7-Dimethoxy-1,2,3,4-tetrahydroisoquinoline
- Other names 6,7-Dimethoxy-THIQ

Identifiers
CAS Number	1745-07-9; hydrochloride: 2328-12-3
3D model (JSmol)	Interactive image
ChEBI	CHEBI:5637
ChEMBL	ChEMBL12367
ChemSpider	14863
EC Number	814-740-4
KEGG	C09460
PubChem CID	15623
CompTox Dashboard (EPA)	DTXSID70169835
- InChI: InChI=1S/C11H15NO2/c1-13-10-5-8-3-4-12-7-9(8)6-11(10)14-2/h5-6,12H,3-4,7H2,1-2H3 Key: CEIXWJHURKEBMQ-UHFFFAOYSA-N
- SMILES: COC1=C(C=C2CNCCC2=C1)OC

Properties
Chemical formula	C_{11}H_{15}NO_{2}
Molar mass	193.246 g·mol^{−1}
- Except where otherwise noted, data are given for materials in their standard state (at 25 °C [77 °F], 100 kPa). Infobox references

Heliamine, also known as 6,7-dimethoxy-1,2,3,4-tetrahydroisoquinoline, is a tetrahydroisoquinoline and cyclized phenethylamine alkaloid found in Pachycereus pringlei and other cacti.

== See also ==
- Substituted tetrahydroisoquinoline
- 3,4-Dimethoxyphenethylamine
- Pachycereus pringlei § Constituents and effects
