= Weberine =

Names
- IUPAC name 5,6,7,8-tetramethoxy-2-methyl-3,4-dihydro-1H-isoquinoline
- Other names 5,6,7,8-Tetramethoxy-2-methyl-1,2,3,4-tetrahydroisoquinoline; 5,6,7,8-Tetramethoxy-2-methyl-THIQ

Identifiers
CAS Number	74046-24-5
3D model (JSmol)	Interactive image
ChEMBL	ChEMBL1195906
ChemSpider	137768
PubChem CID	156448
CompTox Dashboard (EPA)	DTXSID40224945
- InChI: InChI=1S/C14H21NO4/c1-15-7-6-9-10(8-15)12(17-3)14(19-5)13(18-4)11(9)16-2/h6-8H2,1-5H3 Key: VMPOVULYLBHXAO-UHFFFAOYSA-N
- SMILES: CN1CCC2=C(C1)C(=C(C(=C2OC)OC)OC)OC

Properties
Chemical formula	C_{14}H_{21}NO_{4}
Molar mass	267.325 g·mol^{−1}
- Except where otherwise noted, data are given for materials in their standard state (at 25 °C [77 °F], 100 kPa). Infobox references

Weberine, also known as 5,6,7,8-tetramethoxy-2-methyl-1,2,3,4-tetrahydroisoquinoline, is a tetrahydroisoquinoline and cyclized phenethylamine alkaloid found in Pachycereus pringlei and other cacti.

== See also ==
- Substituted tetrahydroisoquinoline
- 2,3,4,5-Tetramethoxyphenethylamine
- Pachycereus pringlei § Constituents and effects
