= TDIQ =

Chemical compound

Clinical data
- Other names: 6,7-Methylenedioxy-1,2,3,4-tetrahydroisoquinoline; 6,7-Methylenedioxy-THIQ; MDTHIQ; MDA-CR; "MDA-Conformationally Restricted"; MDA-THIQ; MDA/THIQ

Identifiers
- IUPAC name: 5,6,7,8-Tetrahydro-[1,3]dioxolo[4,5-g]isoquinoline
- CAS Number: 15052-05-8
- PubChem CID: 27013
- ChemSpider: 25154
- UNII: N2NE2TM9ZF
- CompTox Dashboard (EPA): DTXSID00933985

Chemical and physical data
- Formula: C_{10}H_{11}NO_{2}
- Molar mass: 177.203 g·mol^{−1}
- 3D model (JSmol): Interactive image
- SMILES: c23OCOc2cc1CCNCc1c3
- InChI: InChI=1S/C10H11NO2/c1-2-11-5-8-4-10-9(3-7(1)8)12-6-13-10/h3-4,11H,1-2,5-6H2; Key:JHLDJOBIUVJSTG-UHFFFAOYSA-N

TDIQ, also known as MDTHIQ or MDA-CR, is a tetrahydroisoquinoline drug used in scientific research, which has anxiolytic and anorectic effects in animals. It has an unusual effects profile in animals, with the effects generalising to cocaine and partially to MDMA and ephedrine, but the effects did not generalise to amphetamine and TDIQ does not have any stimulant effects. It is thought these effects are mediated via a partial agonist action at α_{2}-adrenergic receptors, and TDIQ has been suggested as a possible drug for the treatment of cocaine dependence.

== See also ==
- Substituted tetrahydroisoquinoline
- AMPH-CR, DOM-CR, and 3Me6,7MDTIQ
- MDAI
- MDAT
- Norsalsolinol
