= Hydrocotarnine =

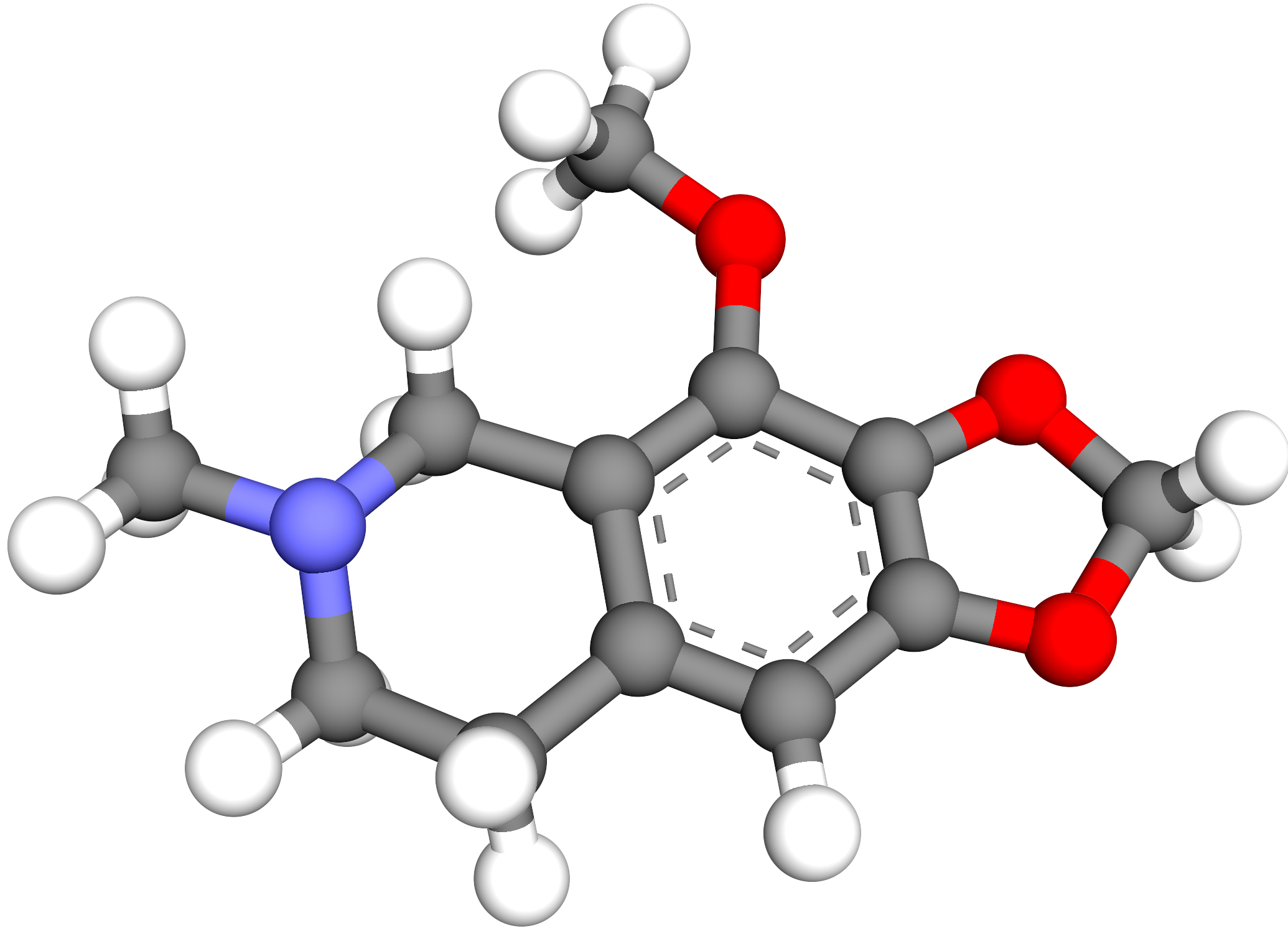

Clinical data
- Trade names: Pavinal
- Other names: Hydrocotarnin; 4-methoxy-6-methyl-7,8-dihydro-5H-[1,3]dioxolo[4,5-g]isoquinoline
- Drug class: Narcotic Analgesics based on DEA classification

Legal status
- Legal status: US: Schedule II (Note: classification (Schedule II in the US), the list includes "opium and opiates, and any salt, compound, derivative, or preparation thereof"); Pavinal is a prescription-only drug; Hydrocotarnine in general is not controlled.

Identifiers
- IUPAC name: 4-methoxy-6-methyl-7,8-dihydro-5H-[1,3]dioxolo[4,5-g]isoquinoline
- CAS Number: 550-10-7
- PubChem CID: 3646
- ChemSpider: 3520
- UNII: G22L6JNE61
- KEGG: D02031
- ChEBI: CHEBI:92664
- ChEMBL: ChEMBL1606295
- CompTox Dashboard (EPA): 60203535

Chemical and physical data
- Formula: C_{12}H_{15}NO_{3}
- Molar mass: 221.256 g·mol^{−1}
- 3D model (JSmol): Interactive image
- SMILES: CN1CCC2=CC3=C(C(=C2C1)OC)OCO3
- InChI: InChI=1S/C12H15NO3/c1-13-4-3-8-5-10-12(16-7-15-10)11(14-2)9(8)6-13/h5H,3-4,6-7H2,1-2H3; Key:XXANNZJIZQTCBP-UHFFFAOYSA-N

Hydrocotarnine, used in combination with oxycodone under the trade name Pavinal (Japan), is a substituted tetrahydroisoquinoline alkaloid, non-narcotic analgesic. It is also classified as a cyclized phenylethylamine. Hydrocotarnine is a drug that is primarily used in combination with oxycodone to enhance its analgesic effect. The mechanism of action of hydrocotarnine is not fully understood, but it is known that it is one of the non-narcotic alkaloids of the poppy Papaver somniferum. Combinations of oxycodone and hydrocotarnine are taken orally and by injection. Hydrocotarnine is reported as a natural product present in Corydalis ophiocarpa, Corydalis ochotensis, and Corydalis heterocarpa var. japonica.

== See also ==
- Substituted tetrahydroisoquinoline
- Cyclized phenethylamine
- Pellotine
