= 6-Br-DMPEA =

Clinical data
- Other names: 6-Bromo-DMPEA; 6-Bromo-3,4-DMPEA; 2-Bromo-4,5-dimethoxyphenethylamine; 2-Bromo-4,5-DMPEA; 2-Br-4,5-DMPEA; 6-Bromo-3,4-dimethoxyphenethylamine; 2,4,5-BMM; Ortho-2C-B; o-2C-B
- Routes of administration: Oral, intravenous injection
- Drug class: Psychedelic drug; Hallucinogen; Stimulant
- ATC code: None

Pharmacokinetic data
- Onset of action: Unknown
- Duration of action: Unknown

Identifiers
- IUPAC name: 2-(2-bromo-4,5-dimethoxyphenyl)ethanamine
- CAS Number: 63375-81-5
- PubChem CID: 820370
- ChemSpider: 716761
- UNII: TB9WH4X4A5
- CompTox Dashboard (EPA): DTXSID70979532

Chemical and physical data
- Formula: C_{10}H_{14}BrNO_{2}
- Molar mass: 260.131 g·mol^{−1}
- 3D model (JSmol): Interactive image
- SMILES: COC1=C(C=C(C(=C1)CCN)Br)OC
- InChI: InChI=1S/C10H14BrNO2/c1-13-9-5-7(3-4-12)8(11)6-10(9)14-2/h5-6H,3-4,12H2,1-2H3; Key:WGAFQMMKTNUYDH-UHFFFAOYSA-N

6-Br-DMPEA, or 6-bromo-DMPEA, also known as 2-bromo-4,5-dimethoxyphenethylamine (2-Br-4,5-DMPEA) or as ortho-2C-B (o-2C-B), is a psychedelic drug of the phenethylamine family related to 3,4-dimethoxyphenethylamine (DMPEA). It is the derivative of DMPEA with a bromine atom at the 6 position. The drug is also an analogue of 2-bromomescaline (2-bromo-3,4,5-trimethoxyphenethylamine) and a positional isomer of 2C-B (4-bromo-2,5-dimethoxyphenethylamine).

== Use and effects ==
According to Alexander Shulgin in his book PiHKAL (Phenethylamines I Have Known and Loved), 6-Br-DMPEA at a dose of 60 mg by intravenous injection produced a rapid rush and intense visuals that were largely yellow and black in color. In addition, it was said to be active orally at doses in the area of 400 to 500 mg, but produced mainly sleep disturbances at these doses, suggesting possible stimulant effects. Subsequent anecdotal reports likewise claimed 6-Br-DMPEA to produce sympathomimetic effects with weak or no psychoactive effects when taken orally. The related compound 3,4-dimethoxyphenethylamine (DMPEA) has been theorized to be poorly active orally due to rapid deamination.

== Pharmacology ==
6-Br-DMPEA is assumed to act on serotonin receptors similarly to other psychedelics.

== Chemistry ==
The chemical synthesis of 6-Br-DMPEA has been described. The N-methyl derivative of 6-Br-DMPEA has also been evaluated but was less active in comparison.

== History ==
6-Br-DMPEA was first described in the literature by Alexander Shulgin in his book PiHKAL (Phenethylamines I Have Known and Loved) in 1991. The information on the drug was given to Shulgin via personal communication. 6-Br-DMPEA was encountered as a novel designer drug and 2C-B substitute under the name o-2C-B in Europe in 2019.

== Society and culture ==
=== Legal status ===
==== Canada ====
6-Br-DMPEA is not a controlled substance in Canada as of 2025.

==== United States ====
6-Br-DMPEA is not an explicitly controlled substance in the United States. However, it could be considered a controlled substance under the Federal Analogue Act if intended for human consumption.

== See also ==
- Substituted methoxyphenethylamine
- 3,4-Dimethoxyphenethylamine (DMPEA)
- 2-Bromomescaline (2-bromo-3,4,5-TMPEA)
- 6-Bromo-MDA (6-bromo-3,4-methylenedioxyamphetamine)
- DODB (6-bromo-DOB)
- TMA-2 (2,4,5-trimethoxyamphetamine)
