= N-Methylheliamine =

Names
- IUPAC name 6,7-dimethoxy-2-methyl-3,4-dihydro-1H-isoquinoline
- Other names 6,7-Dimethoxy-2-methyl-1,2,3,4-tetrahydroisoquinoline; 6,7-Dimethoxy-2-methyl-THIQ; O-Methylcorypalline; Oxymethylcorypalline

Identifiers
CAS Number	16620-96-5
3D model (JSmol)	Interactive image; cation: Interactive image
ChEBI	CHEBI:192040; cation: CHEBI:194516
ChEMBL	ChEMBL1196025
ChemSpider	25766
EC Number	683-442-2
PubChem CID	27694
UNII	UK294JA983
CompTox Dashboard (EPA)	DTXSID90168082
- InChI: InChI=1S/C12H17NO2/c1-13-5-4-9-6-11(14-2)12(15-3)7-10(9)8-13/h6-7H,4-5,8H2,1-3H3 Key: TXPPKWZEHFNZOE-UHFFFAOYSA-N; cation: InChI=1S/C12H17NO2/c1-13-5-4-9-6-11(14-2)12(15-3)7-10(9)8-13/h6-7H,4-5,8H2,1-3H3/p+1 Key: TXPPKWZEHFNZOE-UHFFFAOYSA-O
- SMILES: CN1CCC2=CC(=C(C=C2C1)OC)OC; cation: C1C=2C(=CC(OC)=C(C2)OC)CC[NH+]1C

Properties
Chemical formula	C_{12}H_{17}NO_{2}
Molar mass	207.273 g·mol^{−1}
- Except where otherwise noted, data are given for materials in their standard state (at 25 °C [77 °F], 100 kPa). Infobox references

N-Methylheliamine, also known as O-methylcorypalline or as 6,7-dimethoxy-2-methyl-1,2,3,4-tetrahydroisoquinoline, is a tetrahydroisoquinoline and cyclized phenethylamine alkaloid found in Pachycereus pringlei and other cacti. It is known to be a weak monoamine oxidase inhibitor (MAOI), specifically of monoamine oxidase B (MAO-B) (K_{i} = 29 μM).

== See also ==
- Substituted tetrahydroisoquinoline
- 3,4-Dimethoxyphenethylamine
- Pachycereus pringlei § Constituents and effects
