= A-69024 =

Clinical data
- Other names: A69024; 1-(2-Bromo-4,5-dimethoxybenzyl)-7-hydroxy-6-methoxy-2-methyl-1,2,3,4-tetrahydroisoquinoline
- Routes of administration: Unknown
- Drug class: Dopamine D_{1} receptor antagonist

Identifiers
- IUPAC name: 1-[(2-bromo-4,5-dimethoxyphenyl)methyl]-6-methoxy-2-methyl-3,4-dihydro-1H-isoquinolin-7-ol
- CAS Number: 58939-37-0
- PubChem CID: 173657
- ChemSpider: 151564
- CompTox Dashboard (EPA): DTXSID20974436

Chemical and physical data
- Formula: C_{20}H_{24}BrNO_{4}
- Molar mass: 422.319 g·mol^{−1}
- 3D model (JSmol): Interactive image
- SMILES: CN1CCC2=CC(=C(C=C2C1CC3=CC(=C(C=C3Br)OC)OC)O)OC
- InChI: InChI=1S/C20H24BrNO4/c1-22-6-5-12-8-18(24-2)17(23)10-14(12)16(22)7-13-9-19(25-3)20(26-4)11-15(13)21/h8-11,16,23H,5-7H2,1-4H3; Key:YVBUTIYRCMQJHW-UHFFFAOYSA-N

A-69024 is a selective dopamine D_{1} receptor antagonist which was under development for the treatment of psychotic disorders but was never marketed. Its route of administration is unknown.

== Pharmacology ==
=== Pharmacodynamics ===
A-69024 is a selective dopamine D_{1} receptor antagonist. It shows high affinity for this receptor (K_{i} = 5.3–12.6 nM) and high selectivity for it over the dopamine D_{2} receptor (K_{i} = 1,290–1,320 nM; 102- to 249-fold lower affinity). Conversely, the drug shows very low affinity for the serotonin 5-HT_{2A} and 5-HT_{2C} receptors (K_{i} = >10,000 nM). On the other hand, it shows some affinity for the α_{2}-adrenergic receptor (K_{i} = 95.5 nM) but not for the α_{1}-adrenergic receptor (K_{i} = >1,000 nM).

A-69024 blocks amphetamine- and cocaine-induced hyperlocomotion and apomorphine-induced stereotypy in rodents. It does not affect prolactin levels in rodents, unlike dopamine D_{2} receptor modulators. Along with SCH-23390, it produces aversive effects in rodents, whereas dopamine D_{2} receptor antagonists like spiperone and levosulpiride do not do so. The drug increases cocaine self-administration in rodents. Along with other dopamine D_{1} receptor antagonists, A-69024 has been found to block the head-twitch response induced by the serotonergic psychedelic DOI. Similarly, dopamine D_{2} receptor antagonists were likewise found to block the DOI-induced head-twitch response.

=== Pharmacokinetics ===
A-69024 showed poor oral bioavailability of less than 2.5% in rodents. As such, it is instead administered parenterally.

== Chemistry ==
=== Analogues ===
Radiolabeled forms of A-69024 have been developed and studied, for instance for potential use in positron emission tomography (PET) imaging.

== History ==
A-69024 was first described in the scientific literature by 1989. It was under development by Abbott Laboratories. The drug reached the preclinical research stage of development prior to the discontinuation of its development in 1994.

== See also ==
- Substituted tetrahydroisoquinoline
- List of investigational antipsychotics
