= Tehaunine N-oxide =

Names
- IUPAC name 5,6,7-Trimethoxy-2-methyl-2-oxo-1,2,3,4-tetrahydro-2λ^{5}-isoquinoline
- Other names Tehuanine N-oxide

Identifiers
CAS Number	85769-25-1
3D model (JSmol)	Interactive image
- InChI: InChI=1S/C13H19NO4/c1-14(15)6-5-10-9(8-14)7-11(16-2)13(18-4)12(10)17-3/h7H,5-6,8H2,1-4H3 Key: OHDVYNIZAWGLGE-UHFFFAOYSA-N
- SMILES: COc1cc2CN(=O)(C)CCc2c(c1OC)OC

Properties
Chemical formula	C_{13}H_{19}NO_{4}
Molar mass	253.298 g·mol^{−1}
- Except where otherwise noted, data are given for materials in their standard state (at 25 °C [77 °F], 100 kPa). Infobox references

Tehaunine N-oxide, or tehuanine N-oxide, is a tetrahydroisoquinoline and cyclized phenethylamine alkaloid found in Pachycereus pringlei and other cacti.

== See also ==
- Substituted tetrahydroisoquinoline
- Pachycereus pringlei § Constituents and effects
