= Salsolinol =

Names
- Other names 6,7-Dihydroxy-1-methyl-1,2,3,4-tetrahydroisoquinoline

Identifiers
CAS Number	27740-96-1
3D model (JSmol)	Interactive image
ChEBI	CHEBI:113
ChEMBL	ChEMBL1195032
ChemSpider	82699
KEGG	C09642
PubChem CID	91588
UNII	9ILS801M65
- InChI: InChI=1S/C10H13NO2/c1-6-8-5-10(13)9(12)4-7(8)2-3-11-6/h4-6,11-13H,2-3H2,1H3/t6-/m0/s1 Key: IBRKLUSXDYATLG-LURJTMIESA-N
- SMILES: CC1C2=CC(=C(C=C2CCN1)O)O

Properties
Chemical formula	C_{10}H_{13}NO_{2}
Molar mass	179.219 g·mol^{−1}
Melting point	147–149 °C (297–300 °F; 420–422 K)
- Except where otherwise noted, data are given for materials in their standard state (at 25 °C [77 °F], 100 kPa). Infobox references

Salsolinol is a tetrahydroisoquinoline derived from dopamine which plays a role in neurotransmission and is a dopaminergic neurotoxin.

It has been linked to dopamine-related disorders including Parkinson's disease and alcohol use disorder. It is both synthesized in the human body and ingested in several common dietary sources.

== Chemistry and structure ==
Salsolinol is a catechol isoquinoline which is a yellow solid at room temperature. Salsolinol, as a chiral molecule, comes in two enantiomers: (R)-salsolinol and (S)-salsolinol. The two may have different biological effects.

The racemate can be synthesized via a Pictet-Spengler reaction. A chemoenzymatic, enantioselective synthesis of the (R)-enantiomer has also been reported. Salsolinol has been used as a starting material to prepare some tetrahydroisoquinoline-based prospective drugs.

== Biochemistry ==
=== Natural occurrence ===
Salsolinol is found in several edible plants, most prominently bananas and cocoa products as well as beer. Other plants, including black cohosh, which is used in many herbal remedies, also contain salsolinol.

=== Biosynthesis ===
Salsolinol is endogenously synthesized by multiple routes, although its origin in the human body remains controversial. There are two main routes for its production: one which is through a non-enantiospecific Pictet-Spengler reaction of dopamine and acetaldehyde, and one which is mediated by the enzyme salsolinol synthase.

Salsolinol synthase exclusively produces the (R)-enantiomer of salsolinol.

It has been speculated that salsolinol may also arise from salsolinol-1-carboxylic acid, which is formed by the reaction of dopamine and pyruvic acid. This transformation would occur via a proposed enzymatic pathway that has not been elucidated yet.

== Metabolism ==
Salsolinol is metabolized by an N-methyltransferase enzyme into N-methyl-(R)-salsolinol. This can then be converted by an amine oxidase into 1,2-dimethyl-6,7-dihydroxyisoquinolinium (DMDHIQ+). It can also be methylated to form its 7-methoxy and 6-methoxy versions by the enzyme catechol-O-methyltransferase (COMT).

== Role in the body ==
=== Neurotoxicity and neurotransmission ===
Salsolinol binds to several receptors associated with dopaminergic pathways. It may be an agonist of the μ-opioid receptor and of dopaminergic D1 and D3 receptors.

Salsolinol itself also appears to be neurotoxic, the mechanism of which is not clear. Its metabolites, including N-methyl-(R)-salsolinol, also exhibit neurotoxic effects.

=== Prolactin ===
Salsolinol has been shown to be involved in the secretion of prolactin in the pituitary gland in lactating rats and lactating sheep. Administration of a solution of salsolinol was not shown to raise prolactin levels in human women.

== Disease and disorders ==
=== Parkinson's disease ===
Salsolinol is detectable in the cerebrospinal fluid of Parkinson's disease (PD) patients and is involved in the pathogenesis of PD. It is known to exercise inhibitory effects on tyrosine hydroxylase and to be toxic to dopaminergic neurons. A mechanism for the induction of Parkinson's by salsolinol is linked to its mediation of pyroptosis.

=== Alcohol intake and alcohol use disorders ===
The connection between salsolinol and alcohol intake remains controversial. An early hypothesis was that the synthesis of salsolinol in the human body was caused by ethanol consumption, because it was being made from dopamine and acetaldehyde (a metabolite of ethanol). Several studies in the 1970s and 80s would seem to corroborate this link. However, no consistent connection between ethanol intake and salsolinol levels were conclusively established. As of the 2020s, it is understood that the primary contributor to levels of salsolinol in blood plasma is dietary intake, not acute ethanol consumption. Part of the challenge in studying this is that salsolinol also is produced endogenously, and in all cases its levels are very low, making it difficult to detect and quantify with precision.

Further confounding the issue, there is evidence that salsolinol may be implicated in alcohol use disorder and may play a role in increasing cravings for ethanol. (R)-Salsolinol stereospecifically induces behavioral sensitization and leads to excessive alcohol intake in rats.

== See also ==
- Substituted tetrahydroisoquinoline
- Norsalsolinol
- 6-Hydroxydopamine
- MPTP
- Rotenone
