= Tehaunine =

Names
- IUPAC name 5,6,7-trimethoxy-2-methyl-3,4-dihydro-1H-isoquinoline
- Other names Tehuanine; 5,6,7-Trimethoxy-2-methyl-1,2,3,4-tetrahydroisoquinoline; 5,6,7-Trimethoxy-2-methyl-THIQ

Identifiers
CAS Number	30147-93-4
3D model (JSmol)	Interactive image
ChemSpider	158281
PubChem CID	181981
CompTox Dashboard (EPA)	DTXSID00184238
- InChI: InChI=1S/C13H19NO3/c1-14-6-5-10-9(8-14)7-11(15-2)13(17-4)12(10)16-3/h7H,5-6,8H2,1-4H3 Key: TUWJYOOVMLZJGJ-UHFFFAOYSA-N
- SMILES: CN1CCC2=C(C(=C(C=C2C1)OC)OC)OC

Properties
Chemical formula	C_{13}H_{19}NO_{3}
Molar mass	237.299 g·mol^{−1}
- Except where otherwise noted, data are given for materials in their standard state (at 25 °C [77 °F], 100 kPa). Infobox references

Tehaunine, or tehuanine, also known as 5,6,7-trimethoxy-2-methyl-1,2,3,4-tetrahydroisoquinoline, is a tetrahydroisoquinoline and cyclized phenethylamine alkaloid found in Pachycereus pringlei and other cacti.

== See also ==
- Substituted tetrahydroisoquinoline
- Isomescaline (2,4,5-trimethoxyphenethylamine)
- Pachycereus pringlei § Constituents and effects
