= DOM-CR =

Clinical data
- Other names: DOM/CR; "DOM-Conformationally Restrained"; 5,8-Dimethoxy-7-methyl-THIQ; DOM-THIQ; DOM/THIQ

Identifiers
- IUPAC name: 5,8-dimethoxy-7-methyl-1,2,3,4-tetrahydroisoquinoline
- PubChem CID: 10198181
- ChemSpider: 8373681

Chemical and physical data
- Formula: C_{12}H_{17}NO_{2}
- Molar mass: 207.273 g·mol^{−1}
- 3D model (JSmol): Interactive image
- SMILES: CC1=CC(=C2CCNCC2=C1OC)OC
- InChI: InChI=1S/C12H17NO2/c1-8-6-11(14-2)9-4-5-13-7-10(9)12(8)15-3/h6,13H,4-5,7H2,1-3H3; Key:LDSXYNSFNYUAHP-UHFFFAOYSA-N

DOM-CR, or DOM/CR, an acronym of "DOM-conformationally restrained", is a tetrahydroisoquinoline (THIQ) and cyclized phenethylamine related to the psychedelics DOM and 2C-D. It is a cyclized THIQ analogue of DOM and 2C-D.

DOM-CR shows more than 20-fold reduced affinity for the serotonin 5-HT_{2A} receptor compared to DOM (K_{i} = 2,150 nM vs. 100 nM, respectively). In contrast to DOM, DOM-CR does not substitute for DOM in rodent drug discrimination tests, suggesting that it lacks psychedelic effects. Similarly, DOM-CR does not substitute for dextroamphetamine or MDMA, suggesting that it likewise lacks stimulant or entactogenic effects. However, DOM-CR does substitute for TDIQ (MDTHIQ), a selective α_{2}-adrenergic receptor ligand. At high doses, DOM-CR produces behavioral disruption in drug discrimination tests. In contrast to DOM and amphetamine, DOM-CR does not produce hyperlocomotion in rodents.

DOM-CR was first described in the scientific literature by Richard Glennon and colleagues by 1996.

== Analogues ==
Other cyclized THIQ analogues of psychoactive phenethylamines have also been developed and characterized. These include AMPH-CR (THIQ), METH-CR (N-methyl-THIQ), TDIQ (MDTHIQ, MDA-CR), TDMIQ (MDMTHIQ, MDMA-CR), N-methyl-DOM-CR (Beatrice-CR), DOB-CR, and PMMA-CR. Conformational restriction of stimulant, hallucinogen, and/or entactogen phenethylamines into THIQ analogues, like the preceding compounds, usually reduces or abolishes their associated effects as well as their affinities for monoamine transporters and/or serotonin 5-HT_{2} receptors. However, it does not necessarily remove all pharmacological activity, as evidenced by some THIQs interacting with α_{2}-adrenergic receptors as well as serotonin 5-HT_{1D}, 5-HT_{6}, and/or 5-HT_{7} receptors and producing behavioral effects in animals.

Other cyclized analogues of DOM and related psychedelics include DOM-AT, DOM-AI, DMCPA, TFMBOX, jimscaline, TCB-2, LPH-5, and ZC-B.

== See also ==
- Substituted tetrahydroisoquinoline
- Lorcaserin
- CT-5126
