= Carnegine =

Names
- IUPAC name 6,7-dimethoxy-1,2-dimethyl-3,4-dihydro-1H-isoquinoline
- Other names Pectenine; DMMM-4; 6,7-Dimethoxy-1,2-dimethyl-1,2,3,4-tetrahydroisoquinoline; 6,7-Dimethoxy-1,2-dimethyl-THIQ

Identifiers
CAS Number	490-53-9
3D model (JSmol)	Interactive image
ChEMBL	ChEMBL5272718
ChemSpider	21227
KEGG	C09375
PubChem CID	22646
UNII	EOW70A27WK
CompTox Dashboard (EPA)	DTXSID30871689
- InChI: InChI=1S/C13H19NO2/c1-9-11-8-13(16-4)12(15-3)7-10(11)5-6-14(9)2/h7-9H,5-6H2,1-4H3 Key: HRSIPKSSEVRSPG-UHFFFAOYSA-N
- SMILES: CC1C2=CC(=C(C=C2CCN1C)OC)OC

Properties
Chemical formula	C_{13}H_{19}NO_{2}
Molar mass	221.300 g·mol^{−1}
- Except where otherwise noted, data are given for materials in their standard state (at 25 °C [77 °F], 100 kPa). Infobox references

Carnegine, also known as pectenine, DMMM-4, or 6,7-dimethoxy-1,2-dimethyl-1,2,3,4-tetrahydroisoquinoline, is a tetrahydroisoquinoline and cyclized phenethylamine alkaloid found in the cacti species Carnegiea gigantea and Pachycereus pringlei.

It is known to be pharmacologically active, including acting as a relatively potent monoamine oxidase inhibitor (MAOI), specifically of monoamine oxidase A (MAO-A) (K_{i} = 2 μM for the (R)-enantiomer) but not of monoamine oxidase B (MAO-B), producing strychnine-like convulsions in animals, and having other actions and effects. Carnegine and similar alkaloids might potentiate the effects of mescaline and related compounds like N-methylmescaline via monoamine oxidase inhibition.

The compound was first isolated in 1901 and was first synthesized in 1929.

== See also ==
- Substituted tetrahydroisoquinoline
- 3,4-Dimethoxyphenethylamine
- Pachycereus pringlei § Constituents and effects
