= Salsolidine =

Names
- IUPAC name 6,7-dimethoxy-1-methyl-1,2,3,4-tetrahydroisoquinoline
- Other names 1,2,3,4-Tetrahydro-6,7-dimethoxy-1-methyl-isoquinoline; DMMH-4; 6,7-Dimethylsalsolinol; O-Methylsalsoline; Norcarnegine

Identifiers
CAS Number	38520-68-2; 5784-74-7; 493-48-1; hydrochloride: 63283-42-1
3D model (JSmol)	Interactive image
ChEBI	CHEBI:94438
ChEMBL	ChEMBL320193; ChEMBL1196026; hydrochloride: ChEMBL1883920
ChemSpider	9880; 144429
EC Number	837-124-7
PubChem CID	10302
CompTox Dashboard (EPA)	DTXSID601318133
- InChI: InChI=1S/C12H17NO2/c1-8-10-7-12(15-3)11(14-2)6-9(10)4-5-13-8/h6-8,13H,4-5H2,1-3H3 Key: HMYJLVDKPJHJCF-UHFFFAOYSA-N
- SMILES: COc1cc2C(C)NCCc2cc1OC

Properties
Chemical formula	C_{12}H_{17}NO_{2}
Molar mass	207.273 g·mol^{−1}
- Except where otherwise noted, data are given for materials in their standard state (at 25 °C [77 °F], 100 kPa). Infobox references

Salsolidine, also known as 6,7-dimethylsalsolinol, O-methylsalsoline, or norcarnegine, is a tetrahydroisoquinoline alkaloid found in various cactus species. It is pharmacologically active. Salsolidine has been found to act as a weak but relatively potent monoamine oxidase inhibitor (MAOI), specifically of monoamine oxidase A (MAO-A) ((R)-enantiomer K_{i} = 6 μM), among other actions.

== See also ==
- Substituted tetrahydroisoquinoline
