= Tetrahydroisoquinoline =

Names
- Preferred IUPAC name 1,2,3,4-Tetrahydroisoquinoline
- Other names AMPH-CR; "Amphetamine-Conformationally Restrained"; AMPH-THIQ; AMPH/THIQ

Identifiers
CAS Number	91-21-4
3D model (JSmol)	Interactive image
Abbreviations	TIQ, THIQ
ChEMBL	ChEMBL14346
ChemSpider	6779
ECHA InfoCard	100.001.864
EC Number	202-050-0
PubChem CID	7046
RTECS number	NX4900000
UNII	56W89FBX3E
CompTox Dashboard (EPA)	DTXSID6026115
- InChI: InChI=1S/C9H11N/c1-2-4-9-7-10-6-5-8(9)3-1/h1-4,10H,5-7H2 Key: UWYZHKAOTLEWKK-UHFFFAOYSA-N; InChI=1/C9H11N/c1-2-4-9-7-10-6-5-8(9)3-1/h1-4,10H,5-7H2 Key: UWYZHKAOTLEWKK-UHFFFAOYAB
- SMILES: c1ccc2c(c1)CCNC2

Properties
Chemical formula	C_{9}H_{11}N
Molar mass	133.19 g/mol
Appearance	Deep yellow liquid
Density	1.05 g/mL
Melting point	−30 °C (−22 °F; 243 K)
Boiling point	235 to 239 °C (455 to 462 °F; 508 to 512 K)

Hazards
- GHS labelling
Pictograms	(GHS05: Corrosive) (GHS06: Toxic) (GHS08: Health hazard)
Signal word	Danger
Hazard statements	H301, H310, H314, H332, H371, H412
Precautionary statements	P260, P262, P264, P270, P271, P273, P280, P301+P310, P301+P330+P331, P302+P350, P302+P352, P303+P361+P353, P304+P312, P304+P340, P305+P351+P338, P309+P311, P310, P312, P322, P330, P332+P313, P337+P313, P361, P362, P363, P403+P233, P405, P501
Flash point	99 °C (210 °F; 372 K) (closed cup)
- Except where otherwise noted, data are given for materials in their standard state (at 25 °C [77 °F], 100 kPa). verify (what is ?) Infobox references

Tetrahydroisoquinoline (TIQ or THIQ), also known as AMPH-CR, is an organic compound with the chemical formula C_{9}H_{11}N. Classified as a secondary amine, it is derived from isoquinoline by hydrogenation. It is a colorless viscous liquid that is miscible with most organic solvents. The tetrahydroisoquinoline skeleton is encountered in a number of bioactive compounds and drugs.

== Pharmacology ==
THIQ is a conformationally restrained (CR) or cyclized analogue of β-phenethylamine and amphetamine and is also known as AMPH-CR. In contrast to amphetamine however, THIQ fails to substitute for dextroamphetamine in rodent drug discrimination tests, suggesting that it lacks stimulant effects. Similar findings have been made for other tetrahydroisoquinoline analogues of psychoactive phenethylamines, for instance DOM-CR. In any case, THIQ does substitute for TDIQ (MDTIQ), a selective α_{2}-adrenergic receptor ligand, indicating that it is not pharmacologically inactive.

== Reactions ==
As a secondary amine, tetrahydroisoquinoline has weakly basic properties and forms salts with strong acids. It can be dehydrogenated to give isoquinoline and hydrogenated to decahydroisoquinoline. Like other secondary amines, tetrahydroisoquinoline can be oxidized to the corresponding nitrone using hydrogen peroxide, catalyzed by selenium dioxide.

== Toxicology ==
Tetrahydroisoquinoline derivatives may be formed in the body as metabolites of some drugs, and this was once thought to be involved in the development of alcoholism. This theory has now been discredited and is no longer generally accepted by the scientific community, but endogenous production of neurotoxic tetrahydroisoquinoline derivatives such as norsalsolinol continue to be investigated as possible causes for some conditions such as Parkinson's disease.

== Tetrahydroisoquinolines ==
The tetrahydroisoquinoline skeleton is present in a number of drugs, such as tubocurarine, one of the quaternary ammonium muscle relaxants. Drugs based on 4-substituted tetrahydroisoquinolines include nomifensine and diclofensine. They can be prepared by N-alkylation of benzyl amines with haloacetophenones. Naturally occurring tetrahydroisoquinolines include cherylline and latifine.

Esproquin, which shows hypotensive activity by virtue of its α-adrenergic blocking properties, is made from THIQ.

== See also ==
- Substituted tetrahydroisoquinoline
