= Esproquin =

Tetrahydroisoquinoline-derivative molecule

Clinical data
- Other names: Esproquine

Legal status
- Legal status: Investigational

Identifiers
- IUPAC name: 2-(3-Ethylsulfinylpropyl)-3,4-dihydro-1H-isoquinoline
- CAS Number: 37517-33-2
- PubChem CID: 31951
- UNII: 3JYK9XFM9K
- CompTox Dashboard (EPA): DTXSID40865872

Chemical and physical data
- Formula: C_{14}H_{21}NOS
- Molar mass: 251.39 g·mol^{−1}
- 3D model (JSmol): Interactive image
- SMILES: O=S(CC)CCCN1CC=2C=CC=CC2CC1

Esproquin is an α_{2}-adrenergic receptor agonist derived from tetrahydroisoquinoline. It has a positive inotropic effect, suggesting potential use in treatment of chronic heart failure.

== See also ==
- Substituted tetrahydroisoquinoline
- Cyclized phenethylamine
