= Gigantine =

Names
- IUPAC name 6,7-dimethoxy-1,2-dimethyl-3,4-dihydro-1H-isoquinolin-5-ol
- Other names 1,2-Dimethyl-5-hydroxy-6,7-dimethoxy-1,2,3,4-tetrahydroisoquinoline

Identifiers
CAS Number	32829-58-6
3D model (JSmol)	Interactive image; Interactive image
ChemSpider	533407
KEGG	C09445
PubChem CID	613653
UNII	5QO2DDT36D
CompTox Dashboard (EPA)	DTXSID70331777
- InChI: InChI=1S/C13H19NO3/c1-8-10-7-11(16-3)13(17-4)12(15)9(10)5-6-14(8)2/h7-8,15H,5-6H2,1-4H3 Key: HRJQUAXWKYISJC-UHFFFAOYSA-N; InChI=1S/C13H19NO3/c1-8-10-7-11(16-3)13(17-4)12(15)9(10)5-6-14(8)2/h7-8,15H,5-6H2,1-4H3/t8-/m0/s1 Key: HRJQUAXWKYISJC-QMMMGPOBSA-N
- SMILES: CC1C2=CC(=C(C(=C2CCN1C)O)OC)OC; C[C@H]1C=2C(=C(O)C(OC)=C(OC)C2)CCN1C

Properties
Chemical formula	C_{13}H_{19}NO_{3}
Molar mass	237.299 g·mol^{−1}
- Except where otherwise noted, data are given for materials in their standard state (at 25 °C [77 °F], 100 kPa). Infobox references

Gigantine is a tetrahydroisoquinoline alkaloid found in Carnegiea gigantea and other related cactus species. It was first discovered along with macromerine in 1967. Gigantine is found in significant quantities in many mescaline-containing cactus species, but it is unclear whether it contributes to their psychoactive effects. The compound has been suspected to be hallucinogenic based on animal studies in cats and monkeys, but has not been evaluated in humans.

== See also ==
- Substituted tetrahydroisoquinoline
