= 3-Methoxytyramine =

Trace amine

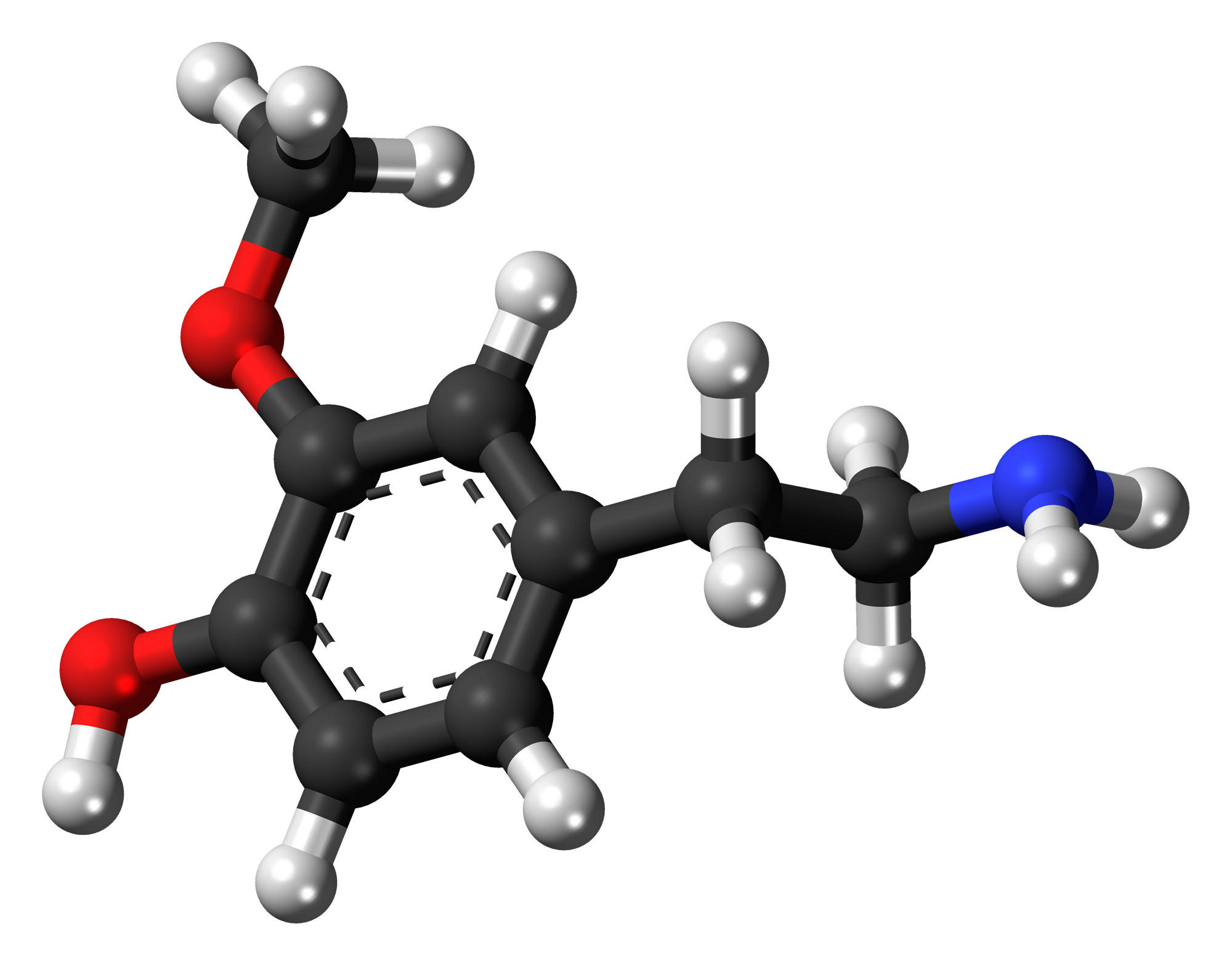

Names
- Preferred IUPAC name 4-(2-Aminoethyl)-2-methoxyphenol
- Other names 3-O-Methyldopamine; GEA

Identifiers
CAS Number	554-52-9
3D model (JSmol)	Interactive image
ChEBI	CHEBI:1582
ChemSpider	1606
ECHA InfoCard	100.122.789
IUPHAR/BPS	6642
MeSH	3-methoxytyramine
PubChem CID	1669
UNII	JCH2767EDP
CompTox Dashboard (EPA)	DTXSID40862189
- InChI: InChI=1S/C9H13NO2/c1-12-9-6-7(4-5-10)2-3-8(9)11/h2-3,6,11H,4-5,10H2,1H3 Key: DIVQKHQLANKJQO-UHFFFAOYSA-N; InChI=1/C9H13NO2/c1-12-9-6-7(4-5-10)2-3-8(9)11/h2-3,6,11H,4-5,10H2,1H3 Key: DIVQKHQLANKJQO-UHFFFAOYAB
- SMILES: COc1cc(ccc1O)CCN

Properties
Chemical formula	C_{9}H_{13}NO_{2}
Molar mass	167.21 g/mol
- Except where otherwise noted, data are given for materials in their standard state (at 25 °C [77 °F], 100 kPa). verify (what is ?) Infobox references

3-Methoxytyramine (3-MT), also known as 3-O-methyldopamine or as 3-methoxy-4-hydroxyphenethylamine, is a human trace amine and the major metabolite of the monoamine neurotransmitter dopamine. It is formed by the introduction of a methyl group to dopamine by the enzyme catechol-O-methyltransferase (COMT). 3-MT can be further metabolized by the enzyme monoamine oxidase (MAO) to form homovanillic acid (HVA), which is then typically excreted in the urine.

== Occurrence ==
3-Methoxytyramine occurs naturally in the prickly pear cactus (genus Opuntia), and is in general widespread throughout the Cactaceae. It has also been found in crown gall tumors on Nicotiana sp.

In humans, 3-methoxytyramine is a trace amine that occurs as a metabolite of dopamine.

Biosynthetic pathways for catecholamines and trace amines in the human brain
In humans, catecholamines and phenethylaminergic trace amines are derived from the amino acid L-phenylalanine.

== Biological activity ==
Originally thought to be physiologically inactive, 3-MT was subsequently found to act as an agonist of the rodent and human TAAR1. 3-MT can induce weak hyperlocomotion in mice and this effect is partially attenuated in TAAR1 knockout mice.

== See also ==
- Tyramine
- 3,4-Dimethoxyphenethylamine
- 3-Hydroxy-4-methoxyphenethylamine
