= Rush (psychology) =

In psychology, a rush is an acute, transcendent state of euphoria.

== Drugs ==
A wide variety of recreational drugs are commonly capable of such an event. These drugs include, but are not limited to, opioids (particularly heroin) and psychostimulants (particularly methamphetamine and cocaine).

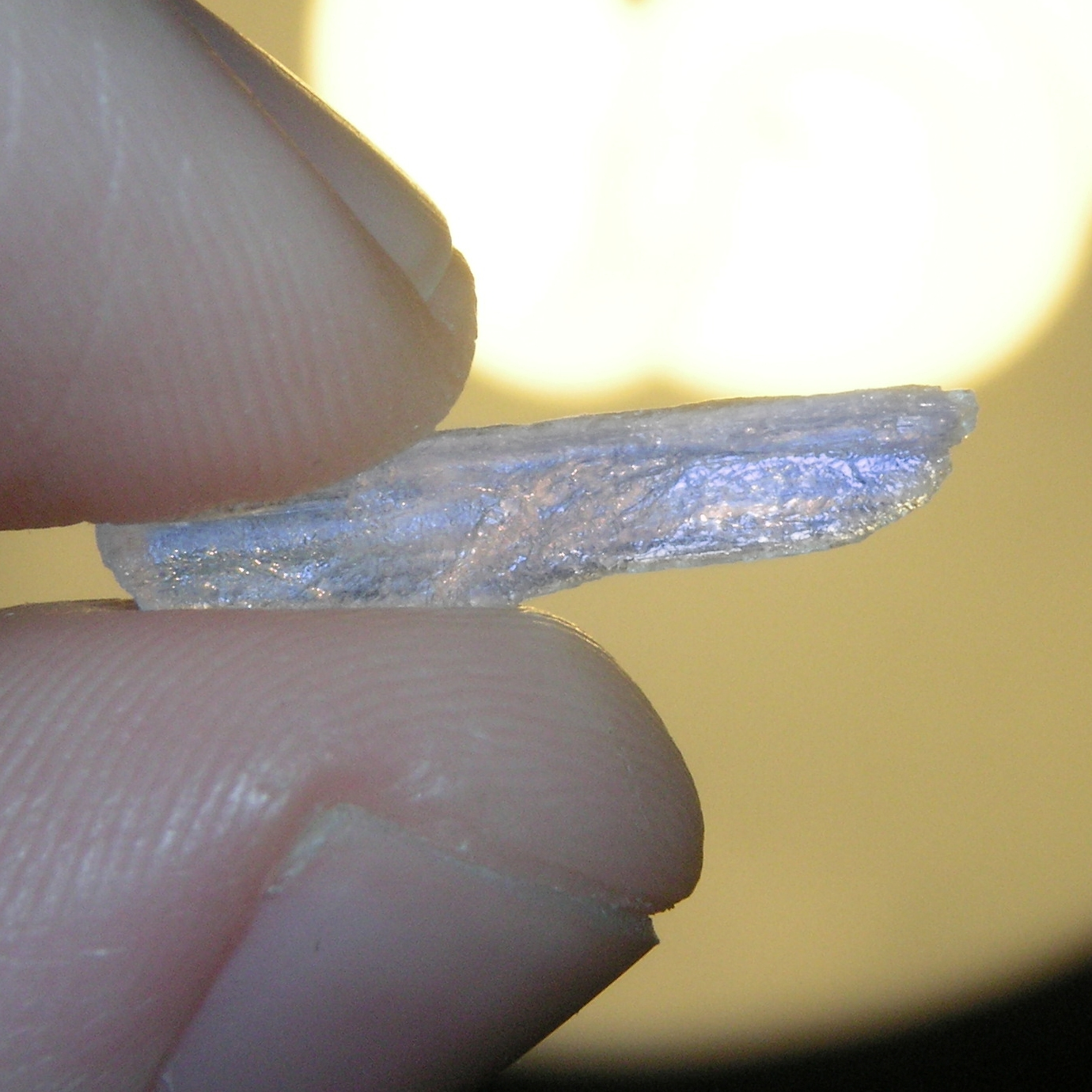
Illicit methamphetamine

=== Intravenous injection ===
A 2017 study involving fifty-six female clients were interviewed by Nicholas E. Goeders suggests that the subjective rush from recreational methamphetamine use is proportional to the rate at which the blood level of the drug increases. Goeders concluded that

Without a doubt methamphetamine, when injected in “sufficient” purity and dose, can produce a subjective physiological response in women that is indistinguishable from an orgasm.

Intravenous injection is the fastest route of administration, causing blood concentrations to rise the most quickly, followed by smoking, suppository (anal or vaginal insertion), insufflation (snorting), and ingestion (swallowing).

== See also ==
- Dopamine
- Reward system
- Party and play
- Sex and drugs
