= 3,4-Dimethoxyphenethylamine =

3,4-DMPEA

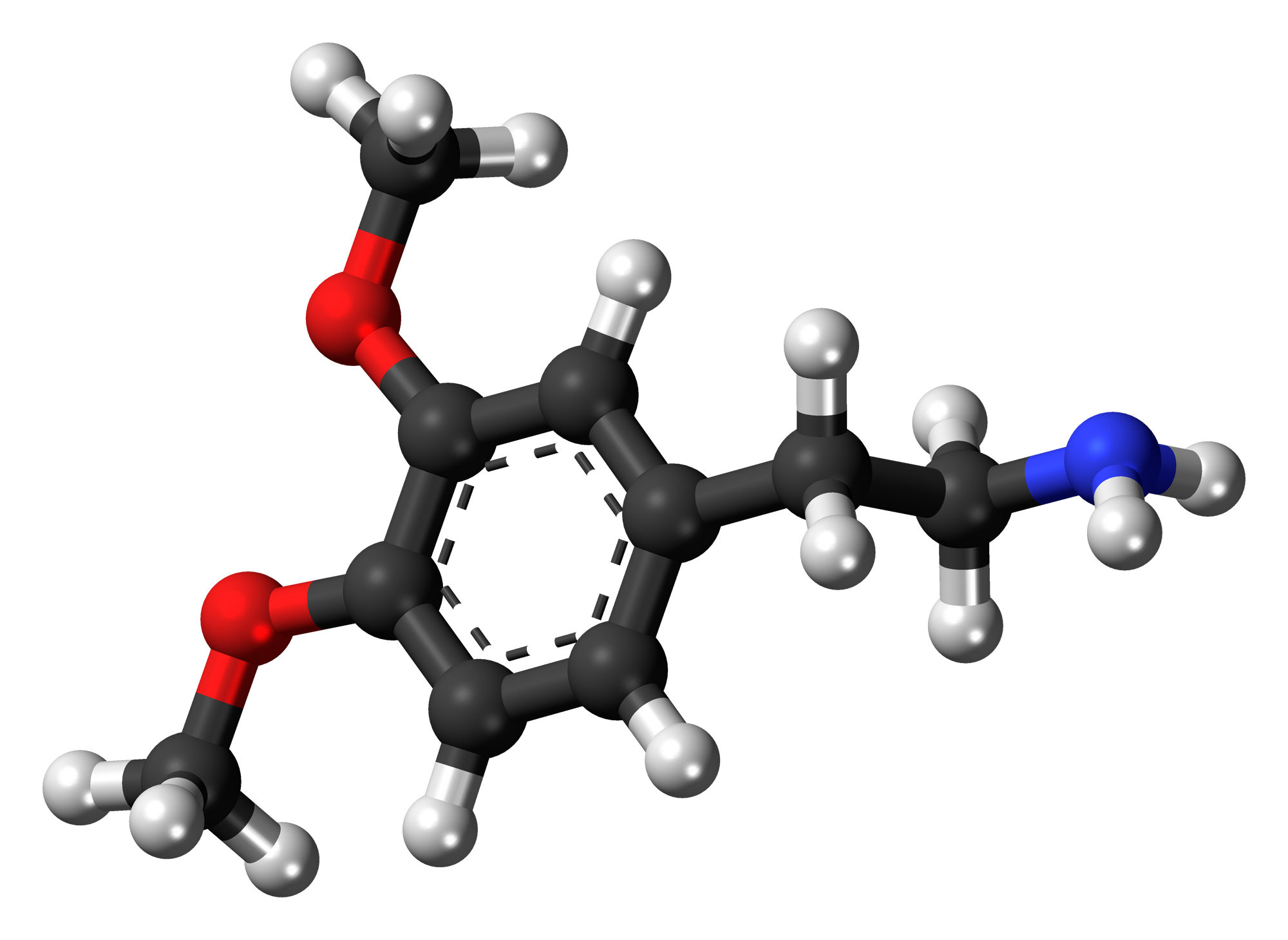

Clinical data
- Other names: DMPEA; 3,4-DMPEA; Homoveratrylamine; O,O-Dimethyldopamine; Di-O-methyldopamine; Dopamine dimethyl ether; 3-Desmethoxymescaline; DMPE; EA-1302; EA1302
- Routes of administration: Unknown
- Drug class: Psychoactive drug; Stimulant; Possible psychedelic drug
- ATC code: None

Pharmacokinetic data
- Bioavailability: Thought to be low due to rapid metabolism
- Metabolism: Oxidative deamination (via monoamine oxidases)
- Metabolites: • N-Acetyl-3,4-dimethoxyphenethylamine • 3,4-Dimethoxyphenylacetic acid
- Onset of action: Unknown
- Elimination half-life: <1 hour
- Duration of action: Unknown

Identifiers
- IUPAC name: 2-(3,4-dimethoxyphenyl)ethan-1-amine
- CAS Number: 120-20-7
- PubChem CID: 8421
- ChemSpider: 8114
- UNII: IQF9T435OP
- ChEBI: CHEBI:136995
- ChEMBL: ChEMBL26019
- CompTox Dashboard (EPA): DTXSID8059506
- ECHA InfoCard: 100.003.979

Chemical and physical data
- Formula: C_{10}H_{15}NO_{2}
- Molar mass: 181.235 g·mol^{−1}
- 3D model (JSmol): Interactive image
- SMILES: O(c1ccc(cc1OC)CCN)C
- InChI: InChI=1S/C10H15NO2/c1-12-9-4-3-8(5-6-11)7-10(9)13-2/h3-4,7H,5-6,11H2,1-2H3; Key:ANOUKFYBOAKOIR-UHFFFAOYSA-N

3,4-Dimethoxyphenethylamine (DMPEA or 3,4-DMPEA), also known as homoveratrylamine, 3-desmethoxymescaline, or O,O-dimethyldopamine, is a psychoactive drug and alkaloid of the phenethylamine family found naturally in humans as well as in cacti such as peyote (Lophophora williamsii), among many others. It is an analogue of the neurotransmitter dopamine where the 3- and 4-position hydroxy groups have been replaced with methoxy groups or have been O-methylated. The drug is also closely related to the psychedelic drugs mescaline (3,4,5-trimethoxyphenethylamine; 3,4,5-TMPEA) and 3,4-dimethoxyamphetamine (3,4-DMA) and is a possible precursor of mescaline in cacti.

== Use and effects ==
In his book PiHKAL (Phenethylamines I Have Known and Loved) and other publications, Alexander Shulgin lists DMPEA's dose as greater than 1,000 mg orally and its duration as unknown. Doses of up to 1,000 mg orally and 10 mg intravenously were completely inactive. However, a dose of 1,500 mg orally produced mild stimulant effects that were compared to those of caffeine. Additionally, in one study, one of 16 people given a dose of 5 mg/kg (~350 mg for a 70-kg person) orally experienced a "typical mescaline-like response" lasting 3 hours, whereas it was inactive in the rest of the individuals, though the single response could have simply been due to placebo effects. It has been theorized that DMPEA is poorly active orally due to rapid deamination.

== Overdose ==
The toxicity of DMPEA in various animal species has been studied.

== Interactions ==
Combination of DMPEA with the monoamine oxidase inhibitor (MAOI) phenelzine has been studied in rodents. In accordance with DMPEA being a substrate for the monoamine oxidase (MAO) enzymes, phenelzine potentiated its behavioral effects.

== Pharmacology ==
=== Pharmacodynamics ===
DMPEA shows activity as a serotonin 5-HT_{2} receptor agonist in the isolated rat aorta and rat stomach fundus strip (A_{2} = 4,370 nM and similar potency as mescaline for the latter). It has been found to induce the release of norepinephrine. The drug has some activity as a monoamine oxidase inhibitor (MAOI).

DMPEA induces the head-twitch response, a behavioral proxy of psychedelic effects, in rodents, and hence could be hallucinogenic in humans. The discriminative stimulus properties of DMPEA in drug discrimination tests in rodents have been studied and have been found to differ from those of mescaline, with DMPEA producing its own distinct interoceptive effects and failing to substitute for those of mescaline. The drug has been found to produce mescaline-like catatonia and catalepsy in animals. It elevates prolactin levels in rodents similarly to psychedelics like mescaline and DOM and this appears to be dependent on activation of serotonin receptors. DMPEA has sympathomimetic effects in animals.

=== Pharmacokinetics ===
DMPEA is metabolized via oxidative deamination by monoamine oxidase (MAO), including by both MAO-A and MAO-B. It is considerably more susceptible to deamination than mescaline. The elimination half-life of DMPEA is said to be less than 1 hour, indicating rapid and extensive metabolism and inactivation. Known metabolites of DMPEA are known to include N-acetyl-3,4-dimethoxyphenethylamine and 3,4-dimethoxyphenylacetic acid, among others.

== Chemistry ==
=== Synthesis ===
The chemical synthesis of DMPEA has been described.

One of the earliest syntheses of DMPEA was that of A. Pictet and M. Finkelstein, who made it in a multi-step sequence starting from vanillin. A similar sequence was subsequently reported by Buck and Perkin, as follows:

3,4-Dimethoxybenzaldehyde (veratraldehyde) → 3,4-Dimethoxycinnamic acid → 3,4-Dimethoxyphenylpropionic acid → 3,4-Dimethoxyphenylpropionamide → 3,4-Dimethoxyphenethylamine

=== Derivatives ===
Some notable derivatives of DMPEA include 3,4-dimethoxyamphetamine (3,4-DMA; α-methyl-DMPEA), mescaline (3,4,5-trimethoxyphenethylamine; TMPEA), and DME (bisnormacromerine; β-hydroxy-DMPEA). Some additional derivatives include 3-methoxytyramine (3-methoxy-4-hydroxyphenethylamine; 3-O-methyldopamine), 3-hydroxy-4-methoxyphenethylamine (HMPEA; 4-O-methyldopamine), 3-methoxy-4-ethoxyphenethylamine (MEPEA; 3-desmethoxyescaline), and 3-methoxy-4-allyloxyphenethylamine (MAPEA; 3-desmethoxyallylescaline). Another derivative is 6-Br-DMPEA (2,4,5-BMM; 2-bromo-4,5-dimethoxyphenethylamine), which is the 6-bromo derivative of DMPEA and a positional isomer of 2C-B that produced a rush and psychedelic effects at a dose of 60 mg intravenously in humans.

== Natural occurrence ==
DMPEA occurs naturally along with mescaline in various species of cacti such as peyote (Lophophora williamsii) and Echinopsis species such as San Pedro and Peruvian Torch, among many other cactus species. It is present in Pachycereus pecten-aboriginum and Pachycereus pringlei, but only in trace amounts in the former and not rigidly proven in the latter. DMPEA also occurs naturally in humans as an O-methylated metabolite of the neurotransmitter dopamine presumably formed by catechol O-methyltransferase (COMT).

== History ==
DMPEA was first described in the scientific literature by at least 1909. It was once theorized to be an endogenous psychotomimetic in the 1960s. The drug was subsequently described in greater detail by Alexander Shulgin in his books PiHKAL (Phenethylamines I Have Known and Loved) in 1991 and The Shulgin Index, Volume One: Psychedelic Phenethylamines and Related Compounds in 2011.

== Society and culture ==
=== Legal status ===
==== United States ====
DMPEA is not an explicitly controlled substance in the United States. However, it could be considered a controlled substance as an analogue of mescaline under the Federal Analogue Act.

== See also ==
- Substituted methoxyphenethylamine
- Scaline § Related compounds
- Dimethoxyphenethylamine
