= Norsalsolinol =

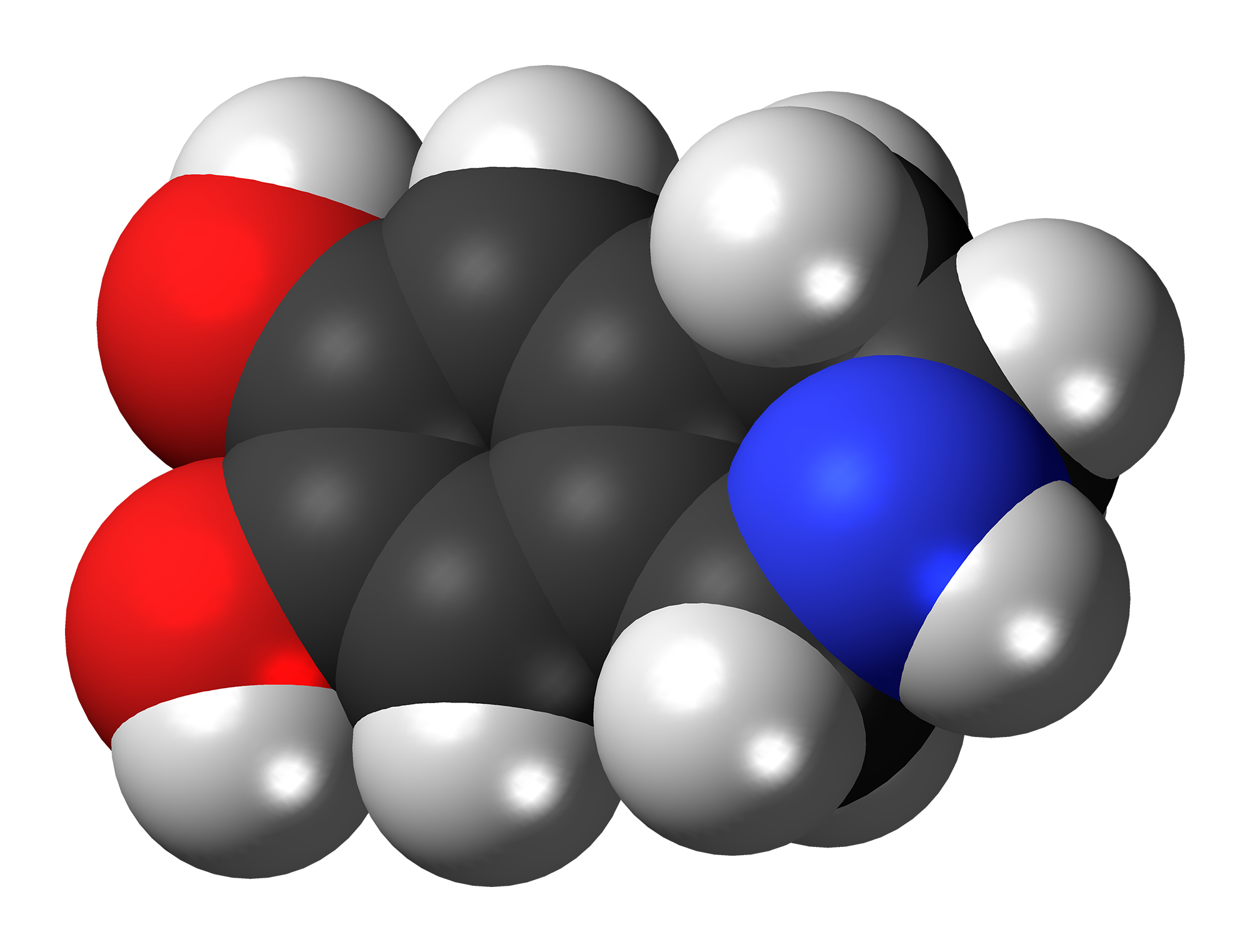

Names
- Preferred IUPAC name 1,2,3,4-Tetrahydroisoquinoline-6,7-diol
- Other names 6,7-dihydroxy-1,2,3,4-tetrahydroisoquinoline

Identifiers
CAS Number	34827-33-3
3D model (JSmol)	Interactive image
ChEBI	CHEBI:173739
ChemSpider	33891
PubChem CID	36937
UNII	9SPO03ZH41
CompTox Dashboard (EPA)	DTXSID90188366
- InChI: InChI=1S/C9H11NO2/c11-8-3-6-1-2-10-5-7(6)4-9(8)12/h3-4,10-12H,1-2,5H2 Key: MBFUSGLXKQWVDW-UHFFFAOYSA-N; InChI=1/C9H11NO2/c11-8-3-6-1-2-10-5-7(6)4-9(8)12/h3-4,10-12H,1-2,5H2 Key: MBFUSGLXKQWVDW-UHFFFAOYAF
- SMILES: C1CNCC2=CC(=C(C=C21)O)O

Properties
Chemical formula	C_{9}H_{11}NO_{2}
Molar mass	165.189 g/mol

Hazards
- Occupational safety and health (OHS/OSH)
Main hazards	Neurotoxin
- Except where otherwise noted, data are given for materials in their standard state (at 25 °C [77 °F], 100 kPa). verify (what is ?) Infobox references

Norsalsolinol is a tetrahydroisoquinoline that is produced naturally in the body through the metabolism of dopamine. It has been shown to be a selective dopaminergic neurotoxin, and has been suggested as a possible cause of neurodegenerative conditions such as Parkinson's disease and the brain damage associated with alcoholism, although evidence for a causal relationship is unclear.

The related compound (R)-salsolinol, which has been shown to be a product of ethanol metabolism, stereospecifically induces behavioral sensitization and leads to excessive alcohol intake in rats.

== See also ==
- Substituted tetrahydroisoquinoline
- SKF-39315
- 6-Hydroxydopamine
- MPTP
- Rotenone
