= Cactus alkaloids =

Chemical compounds found in cacti

Cactus alkaloids are alkaloids that occur in cactus. Structurally, they are tetrahydroisoquinolines and phenethylamines.

== Occurrence and representatives ==
Cactus alkaloids are found in the cactus family, particularly in the genus Lophophora, which alone contains over 40 known compounds. The alkaloids can be categorized into two groups, derived from phenethylamine and tetrahydroisoquinoline, respectively. The primary alkaloid in Lophophora williamsii (peyote) (in terms of quantity) is mescaline, followed by pellotine. In the species Lophophora diffusa and Lophophora fricii (false peyotes), the primary alkaloid is pellotine, followed by anhalonidine in L. fricii and anhalamine in L. diffusa. In species outside the genus Lophophora, the content and variety of cactus alkaloids are significantly lower, but some contain compounds such as hordenine (N,N-dimethyltyramine), N-methyltyramine, mescaline, or pellotine. A number of psychoactive cacti are also found in the genus Echinopsis, such as the San Pedro cactus.

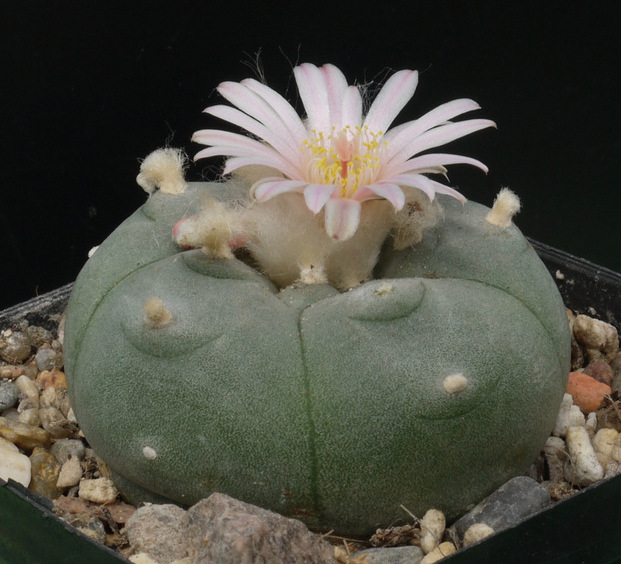
Lophophora williamsii

Mescaline

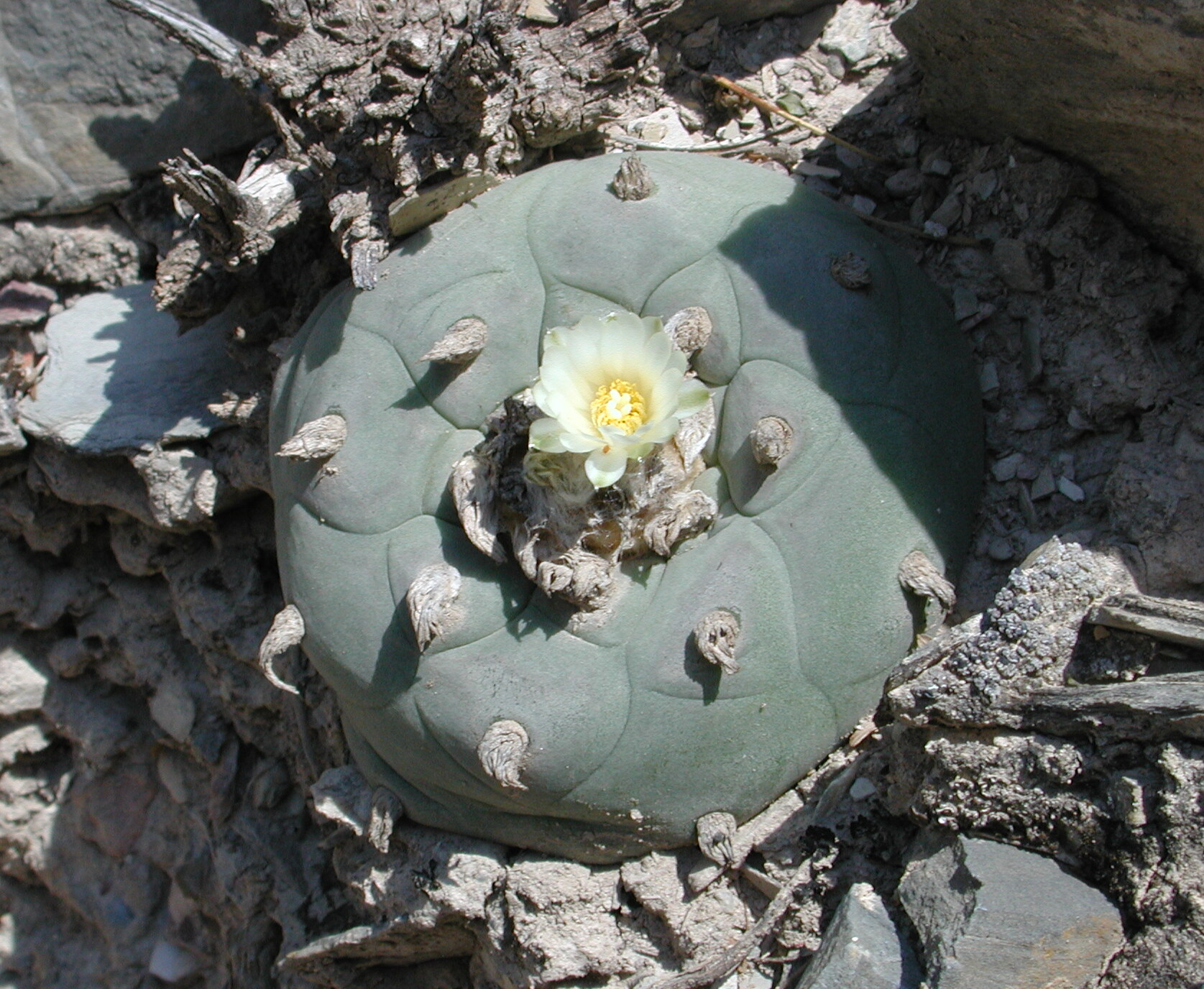
Lophophora diffusa

Pellotine

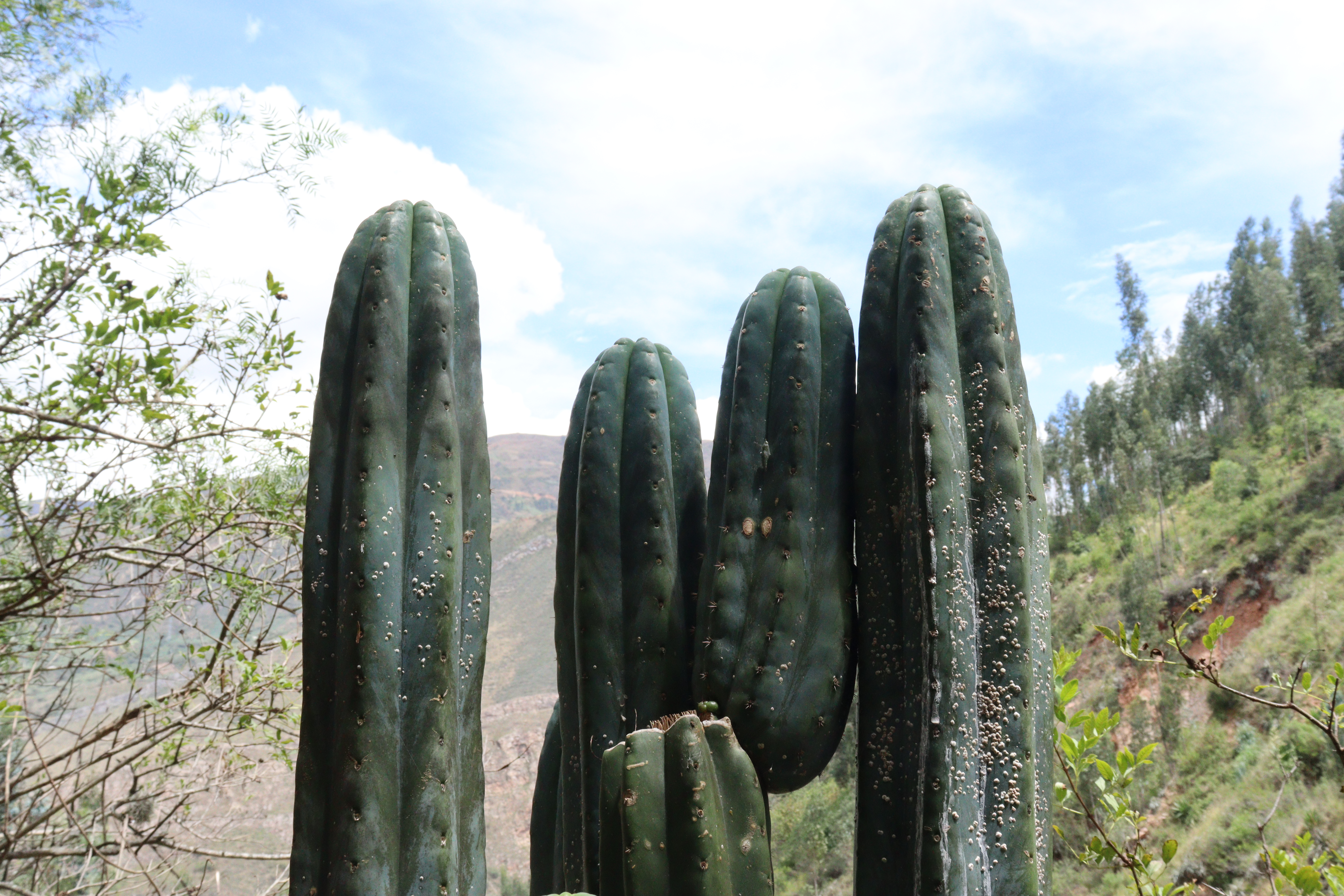
Echinopsis pachanoi

== Biosynthesis ==
The amino acid tyrosine is the starting point for the biosynthesis of cactus alkaloids

The biosynthesis of cactus alkaloids starts from the amino acid tyrosine and proceeds initially via tyramine and dopamine. By introducing a third hydroxy group and methylation of all three hydroxy groups, mescaline is formed. A tetrahydroisoquinoline scaffold can also be constructed from the intermediates of mescaline biosynthesis by a ring closure, resulting in anhalamine and anhalonidine. Anhalonidine is the biosynthetic precursor of anhalonine, in which a benzodioxole unit is formed from a hydroxyl and a methoxy group. Further branching of the biosynthetic pathways occurs through the methylation of the amino group from dopamine. This pathway leads to pellotine and subsequently to lophophorine.

== Synthesis ==
Various synthetic methods for cactus alkaloids are known. In the case of tetrahydroisoquinoline compounds, the ring system is usually built up by a Bischler-Napieralski reaction. Anhalamine, anhalidine, anhalonidine, and pellotine can be synthesized starting from mescaline, among others.

== Use and effects ==
Mescaline is a psychedelic and is responsible for the hallucinogenic properties of Lophophora williamsii (peyote). The other alkaloids predominantly exhibit much less pronounced pharmacological effects and may have anticonvulsant properties. Pellotine was briefly used as a sedative and hypnotic in the early 20th century.
