= Anhalotine =

Alkaloid found in Peyote

Names
- IUPAC name 6,7-dimethoxy-2,2-dimethyl-8-hydroxy-1,2,3,4-tetrahydroisoquinolin-2-ium iodide
- Other names Anhalidine methiodide; anhalotine iodide

Identifiers
3D model (JSmol)	Interactive image
- InChI: InChI=1S/C13H20NO3.I/c1-14(2)6-5-10-8(13(14)7-11(10)15-3)9(16-4)12(17)10;/h7,9,12,17H,5-6H2,1-4H3;/q+1;-1
- SMILES: [I-].COc1c(OC)c(O)c2c(c1)CC[N+](C)(C)C2

Properties
Chemical formula	C_{13}H_{20}INO_{3}
Molar mass	365.21
Appearance	Colorless crystals
Melting point	219 –220 °C
Solubility in water	Soluble in water and ethanol
- Except where otherwise noted, data are given for materials in their standard state (at 25 °C [77 °F], 100 kPa). Infobox references

Anhalotine is a tetrahydroisoquinoline alkaloid found in the cactus Lophophora williamsii (peyote). It is a quaternary ammonium compound, specifically the N-methyl version of the secondary alkaloid anhalidine. Anhalotine occurs in trace amounts alongside other peyote alkaloids such as mescaline, anhalonidine, pellotine, and anhalonine. As a quaternary salt, it is not psychoactive.

== History ==
Anhalotine was first isolated from peyote in 1968 by Govind J. Kapadia, Narendra J. Shah, and Theodore B. Zalucky at the University of Michigan. Using thin-layer chromatography, ultraviolet spectroscopy, and infrared spectroscopy, they identified it as the methiodide of anhalidine, yielding 7 mg from 2.3 kg of dried peyote buttons (0.0003% dry weight).

== Natural occurrence ==
Anhalotine is a minor alkaloid in Lophophora williamsii, present at concentrations of approximately 0.0003% by dry weight. It has also been reported in trace amounts in other Lophophora species, such as L. diffusa, and potentially in related cacti like Aztekium ritteri and Pelecyphora aselliformis via its parent compound anhalidine. Concentrations vary depending on factors such as plant age, habitat, and analytical methods.

== Chemistry ==
=== Structure ===
Anhalotine is a quaternary tetrahydroisoquinoline alkaloid with the chemical formula C_{13}H_{20}NO_{3}^{+} (cation) and C_{13}H_{20}INO_{3} (iodide salt). It consists of a 1,2,3,4-tetrahydroisoquinoline core substituted with methoxy groups at positions 6 and 7, a hydroxy group at position 8, and a 2,2-dimethyl-2-ium iodide at the nitrogen (position 2). It is structurally related to anhalidine, from which it differs only by the additional methyl group on the nitrogen, forming the quaternary salt.

=== Biosynthesis ===
Anhalotine shares the biosynthetic pathway common to peyote's tetrahydroisoquinoline alkaloids, beginning with the amino acid L-tyrosine. Tyrosine undergoes decarboxylation to tyramine, followed by meta-hydroxylation, para-O-methylation, and cyclization via a Pictet-Spengler reaction with formaldehyde (derived from S-adenosylmethionine). This yields anhalidine, which is then N,N-dimethylated to form the quaternary anhalotine.

== Pharmacology ==
As a bicyclic quaternary ammonium compound, anhalotine is highly polar and poorly crosses the blood-brain barrier, suggesting minimal central nervous system activity. No dedicated pharmacological studies or human/animal bioassays have been conducted on anhalotine, likely due to the challenges of isolating sufficient quantities. It is not considered to contribute significantly to the psychoactive effects of peyote, which are primarily attributed to mescaline.

== Legal status ==
Anhalotine is not specifically scheduled under international conventions such as the Convention on Psychotropic Substances or in major national drug laws, including the U.S. Controlled Substances Act. However, it is a constituent of Lophophora williamsii, which is classified as a Schedule I controlled substance in the United States owing to the mescaline content. Exemptions exist for religious use by members of the Native American Church.

== See also ==
- Anhalidine
- Anhalonidine
- Peyotine
- Pellotine
- Mescaline
- Tetrahydroisoquinoline
