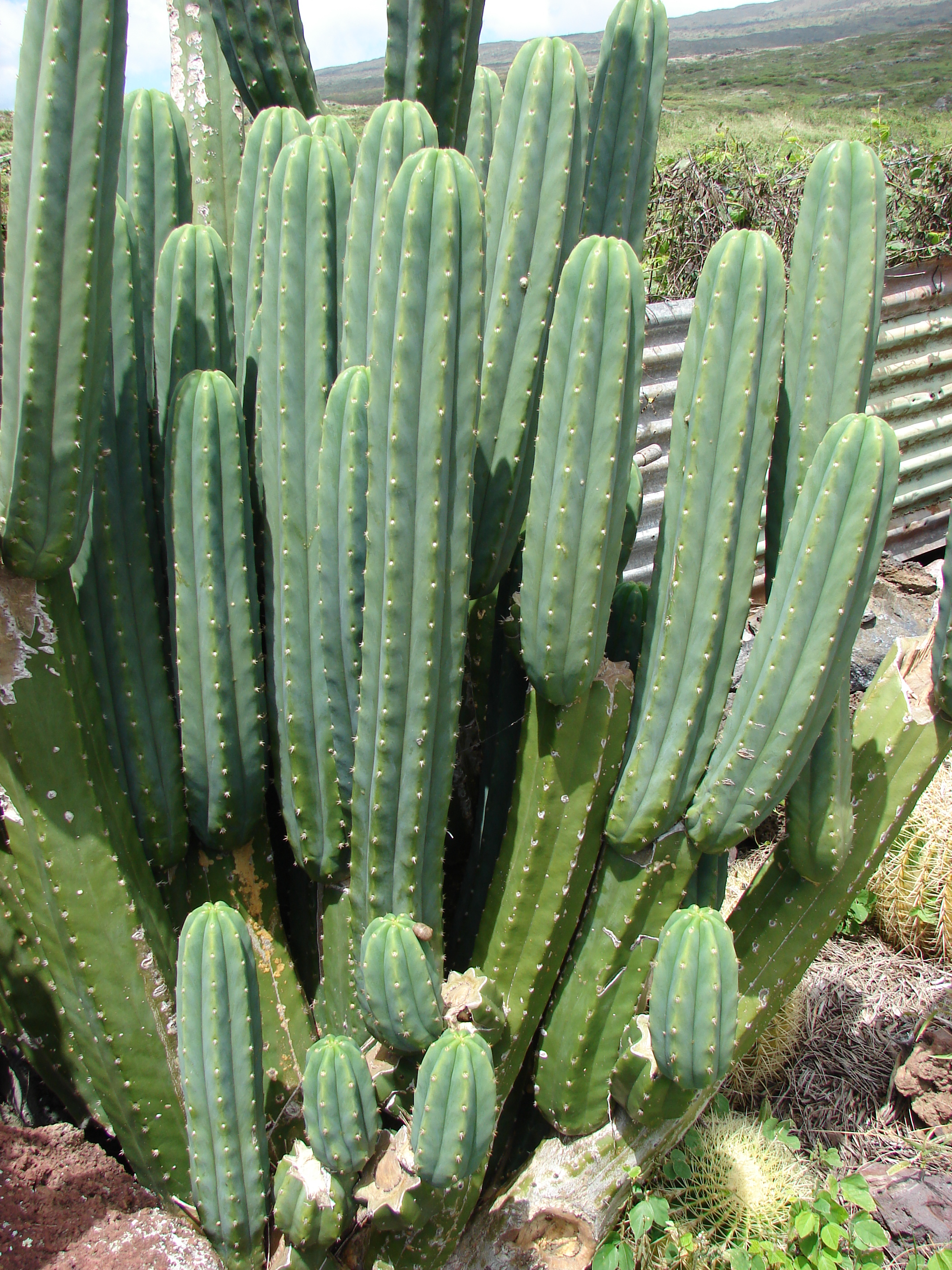
- In Hawaii

Conservation status
- Least Concern (IUCN 3.1)

Scientific classification
- Kingdom: Plantae
- Clade: Tracheophytes
- Clade: Angiosperms
- Clade: Eudicots
- Order: Caryophyllales
- Family: Cactaceae
- Subfamily: Cactoideae
- Genus: Echinopsis
- Species: E. pachanoi

Binomial name
- Echinopsis pachanoi (Britton and Rose) H.Friedrich & G.D.Rowley

Synonyms
- Cereus pachanoi (Britton & Rose) Werderm.; Echinopsis pachanoi (Britton & Rose) H.Friedrich & G.D.Rowley; Echinopsis santaensis (Rauh & Backeb.) H.Friedrich & G.D.Rowley; Echinopsis schoenii (Rauh & Backeb.) H.Friedrich & G.D.Rowley; Trichocereus macrogonus subsp. pachanoi (Britton & Rose) Lodé; Trichocereus macrogonus var. pachanoi (Britton & Rose) Albesiano & R.Kiesling; Trichocereus macrogonus subsp. sanpedro M.H.J.van der Meer; Trichocereus pachanoi Britton & Rose; Trichocereus santaensis Rauh & Backeb.; Trichocereus schoenii Rauh & Backeb.; Trichocereus torataensis F.Ritter

= Echinopsis pachanoi =

Mescaline-containing cactus

Echinopsis pachanoi, synonyms including Trichocereus pachanoi and Trichocereus macrogonus var. pachanoi, is a fast-growing columnar cactus found in the Andes at 2,000–3,000 m (6,600–9,800 ft) in altitude. It is one of a number of kinds of cacti known as San Pedro cactus. It is native to Ecuador, and Peru, but is also found in Bolivia, Colombia, central Chile, the Canary Islands, and mainland Spain, and is cultivated in other parts of the world. Uses for it include traditional medicine and traditional veterinary medicine, and it is widely grown as an ornamental cactus. It has been used for healing and religious divination in the Andes Mountains region for over 3,000 years.

== Description ==
Echinopsis pachanoi has light to dark green stems, sometimes glaucous, with a diameter of 6–15 cm (2.4–5.9 in) and usually 6–8 ribs. The whitish areoles may produce up to seven yellow to brown spines, each up to 2 cm (0.8 in) long although typically shorter in cultivated varieties, sometimes being mostly spineless. The areoles are spaced evenly along the ribs, approximately 2 cm (0.8 in) apart. Its relatively sparse spination is one reason it is widely cultivated as an ornamental and landscaping plant. E. pachanoi is normally 3–6 m (10–20 ft) tall and has multiple branches, usually extending from the base but will emerge around broken branches. The tallest recorded specimen was 12.2 metres (40 ft) tall. White flowers are produced at the end of the stems; they open at night and last for about two days. Large numbers can be produced by well established cacti and may open new flowers over a period of weeks. The flowers are large, around 19–24 cm (7.5–9.4 in) long with a diameter of up to 20 cm (7.9 in) and are highly fragrant. There are black hairs along the length of the thick base leading to the flower. Oblong dark green fruits are produced after fertilization, about 3 cm (1.2 in) across and 5–6 cm (2.0–2.4 in) long, eventually bursting open to reveal a white flesh filled with small seeds.

== Taxonomy ==
Echinopsis pachanoi was first described as the species Trichocereus pachanoi by Britton and Rose in 1920. It was reduced to the variety of T. macrogonus var. pachanoi in 2012. It was said to be distinguished from T. macrogonus var. macrogonus by the smaller number of spines per areole, and by usually being somewhat shorter with more slender stems. As of November 2025, Plants of the World Online regarded Trichocereus as a synonym of Echinopsis, and reinstated the original name Echinopsis pachanoi.

== Traditional uses ==
Hordenine, an alkaloid found in Echinopsis pachanoi.

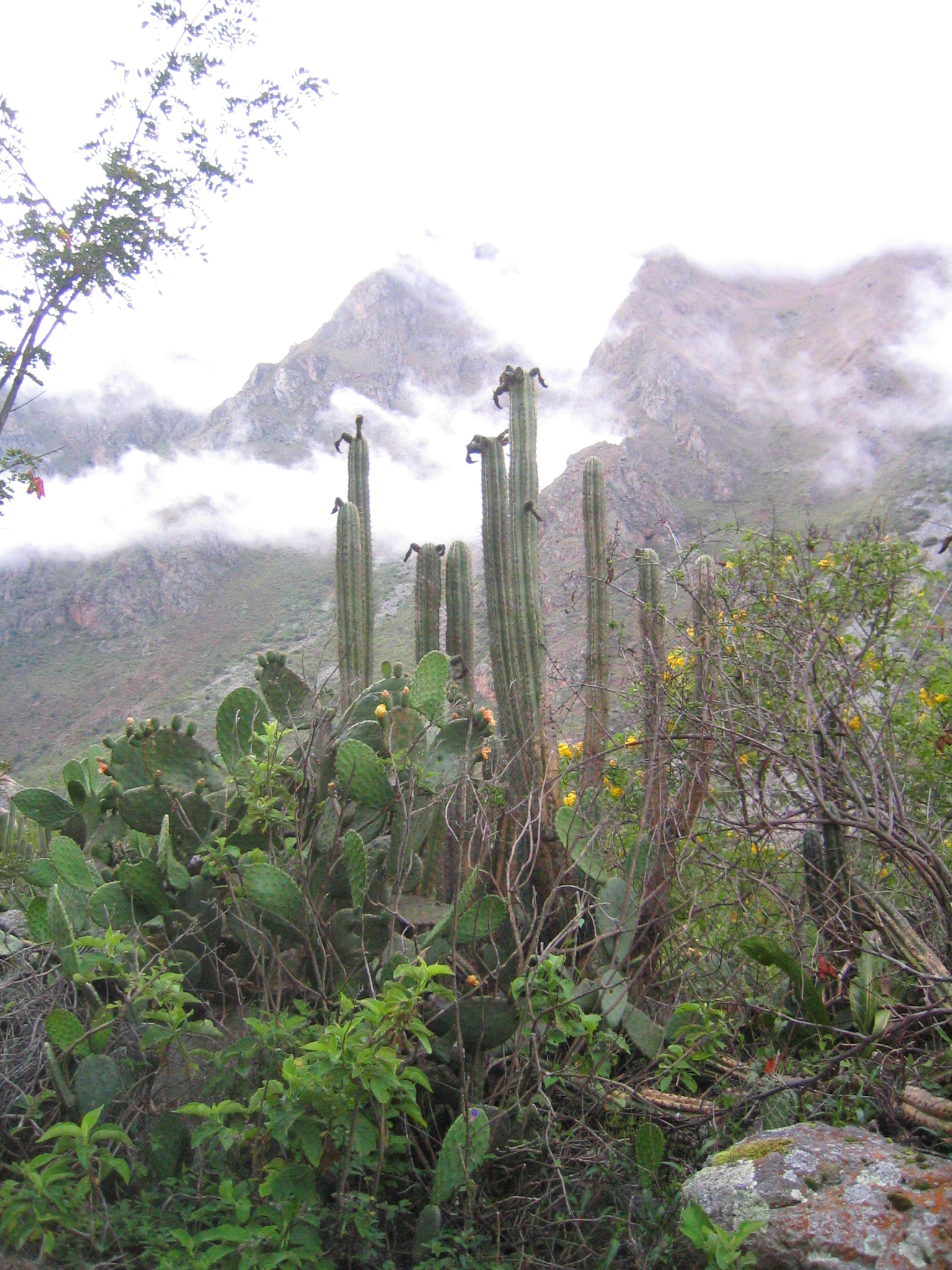
Echinopsis pachanoi, San Pedro Cactus, the tall cactus in the mid-foreground, in its natural habitat in Peru. Several fruits with shrivelled flowers can be seen.

Echinopsis pachanoi is known by many names throughout South America such as achuma, huachuma, wachuma, aguacolla, hahuacollay, lapituq, tsuná, San Pedro or giganton. It has a long history of being used in Andean traditional medicine.

Archaeological studies have found evidence of use going back two thousand years, to Moche culture, Nazca culture, and Chavín culture. Although the Spanish attempted to suppress its use, this failed, as shown by the Christian element in the common name "San Pedro cactus" – Saint Peter cactus. Edward Anderson attributes this to the belief that just as St Peter holds the keys to heaven, the effects of the cactus allow users "to reach heaven while still on earth."

In Peruvian shamanism, called mesa norteña, healers (curanderos) boil the San Pedro cactus, with spines removed, into a bitter drink called cimora, often mixed with tobacco to enhance spiritual visions. This brew helps shamans gain "vista" (magical vision) to diagnose illnesses, cleanse spirits, and connect with ancestors or nature spirits at sacred sites like the Las Huaringas lagoons. The practice also exists in Ecuador, Bolivia, and parts of Chile and Argentina, where indigenous groups like the yachakkuna use San Pedro for healing and spiritual guidance.

The early 2000s saw the first major international coverage of traditional plant medicine in publications such as The New York Times Magazine and National Geographic Adventure, which featured the Blue Morpho retreat center.

In 2022, the Peruvian Ministry of Culture declared the traditional use of San Pedro cactus in northern Peru as cultural heritage.

== Alkaloids ==
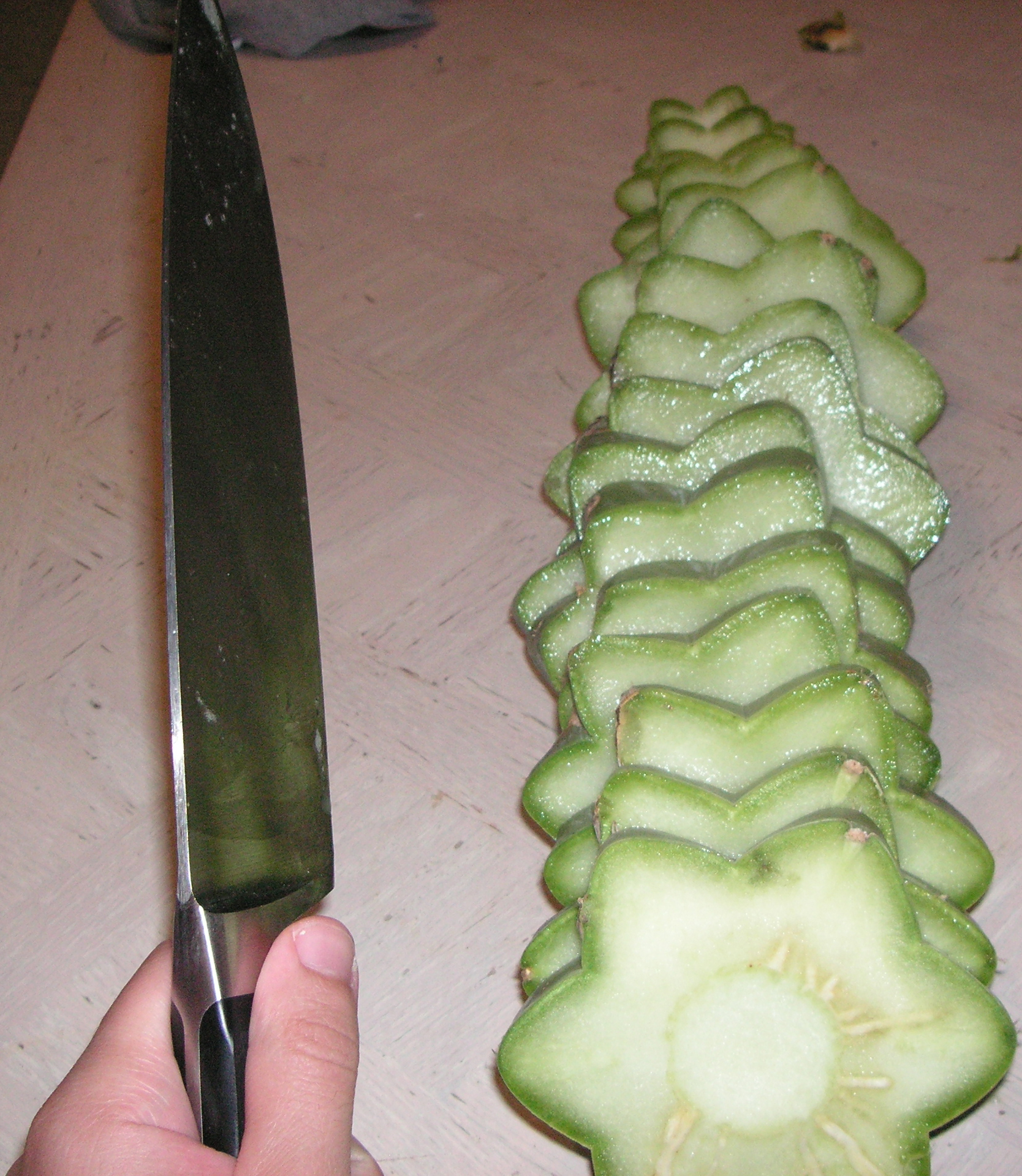
Sliced to be brewed.

Echinopsis pachanoi contains a number of alkaloids (especially cactus alkaloids), including the well-studied chemical mescaline (from 0.053% up to 4.7% of dry cactus weight), and also 3,4-dimethoxyphenethylamine, 3-Methoxytyramine, 4-hydroxy-3,5-dimethoxyphenethylamine, anhalonidine, anhalinine, hordenine, and tyramine.

Mescaline is a psychedelic drug and entheogen, which is also found in some other species of the genus Echinopsis (e.g. Echinopsis lageniformis and Echinopsis tacaquirensis) and the species Lophophora williamsii (peyote). Mescaline induces a psychedelic state comparable to those produced by LSD and psilocybin, but with unique characteristics. According to a research project in the Netherlands, ceremonial San Pedro use seems to be characterized by relatively strong spiritual experiences, and low incidence of challenging experiences.

Anecdotal evidence suggests that the highest concentration of active substances is found in the layer of green photosynthetic tissue just beneath the skin. Mescaline is not evenly distributed within single specimens of San Pedro cactus.

== Cultivation ==
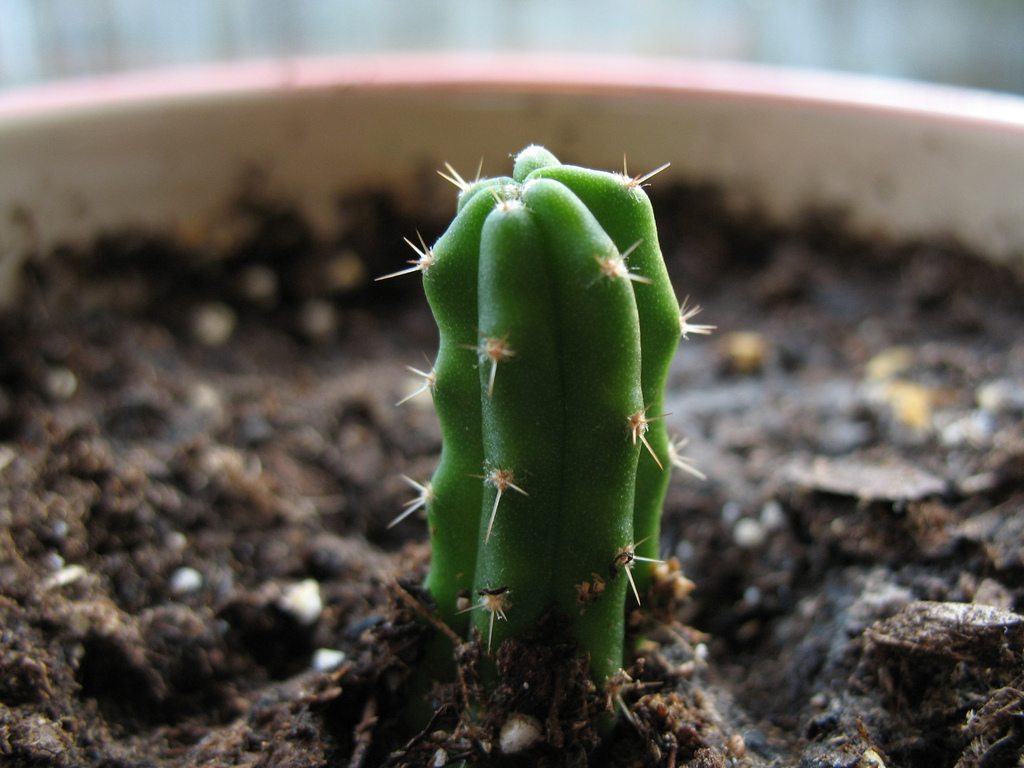
Echinopsis pachanoi seedling

Echinopsis pachanoi is hardy in USDA hardiness zones 8b to 10. The range of minimum temperatures in which it is known to grow is between -9.4 °C and 10 °C. Because it grows naturally at high altitudes in the Andes, it can withstand temperatures far below those of many other cacti for a day or two if the soil remains dry. It requires fertile, free-draining soil. A good soil mix includes an inorganic lightweight substrate such as pumice or perlite. Plants grow up to 30 cm per year. They are susceptible to fungal diseases if over-watered, but are not nearly as sensitive as many other cacti, especially in warm weather when they are in their growth phase. They can be sunburned and display a yellowing chlorotic reaction to overexposure to sunlight.

In winter, plants can etiolate, or become thin, due to lower levels of light. This may be problematic if the etiolated zone is not sufficiently strong to support future growth as the cactus may break in strong winds. To avoid etiolation, growers who overwinter plants indoors sometimes induce winter dormancy by keeping plants cool and dry, which halts growth until spring.

In Oaxaca, Mexico, they are commonly planted close together to make an impenetrable cactus fence. In Peru, a San Pedro cactus planted by a house entrance is popularly believed to protect the home.

=== Propagation from cuttings ===
Like many other plants, Echinopsis pachanoi can be propagated from cuttings. The result is a genetic clone of the parent plant. It is therefore a popular method of propagating highly prized cultivars, sometimes by grafting small cuttings onto fast-growing cultivars like the Predominant Cultivar (PC), or onto other columnar cacti including Echinopsis species and Myrtillocactus geometrizans. Some names of cultivars that are highly prized by cactus collectors are Ogunbodede, Vilcabamba A, and Yowie. Comparable named cultivars exist for the closely related Echinopsis lageniformis, which are likewise propagated by grafting.

A cactus column can be also laid on its side on the ground (like a log), and eventually roots will sprout from it and grow into the ground. After time, sprouts will form and cactus columns will grow upward out of it along its length.

=== From seed ===
Like a lot of its relatives, Echinopsis pachanoi is easily grown from seed, often by means of a so-called "Takeaway Tek". This term refers to the practice of sowing cactus seed into plastic containers, such as those many food takeaways are delivered in. This creates a semi-controlled humidity environment chamber for six months to a year, in which the seed may germinate and then grow relatively unbothered by environmental contamination. To accelerate the growth of seedlings, they can be grafted on Pereskiopsis.

== Legal status ==
In most countries, it is legal to cultivate Echinopsis pachanoi. In countries where possession of mescaline and related compounds is illegal and highly penalized, cultivation for the purposes of consumption is most likely illegal and also highly penalized. This is the case in the United States, Australia, Canada, Sweden, Germany, and New Zealand, where it is currently legal to cultivate the San Pedro cactus for gardening and ornamental purposes, but not for consumption.

== Gallery ==
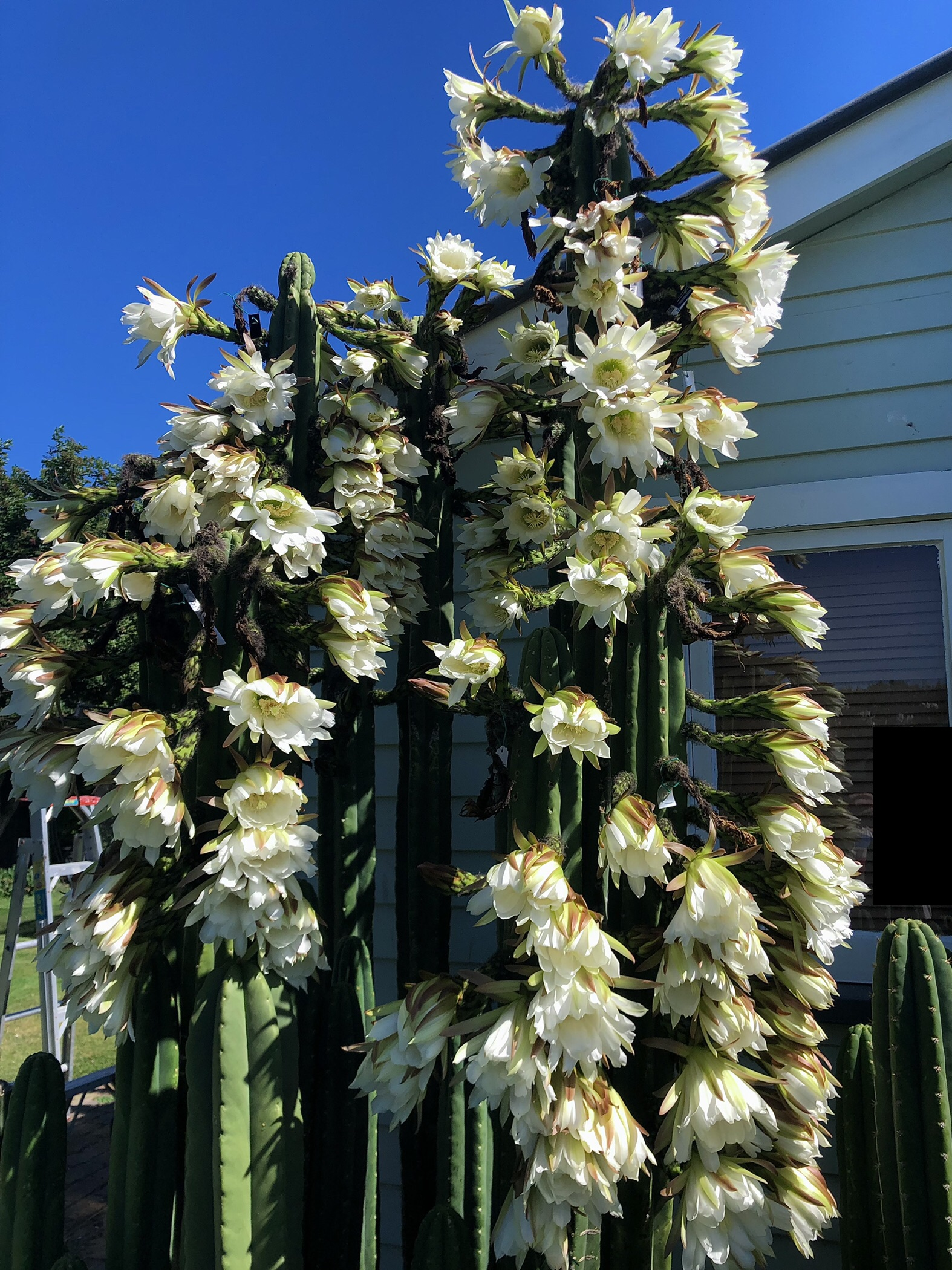

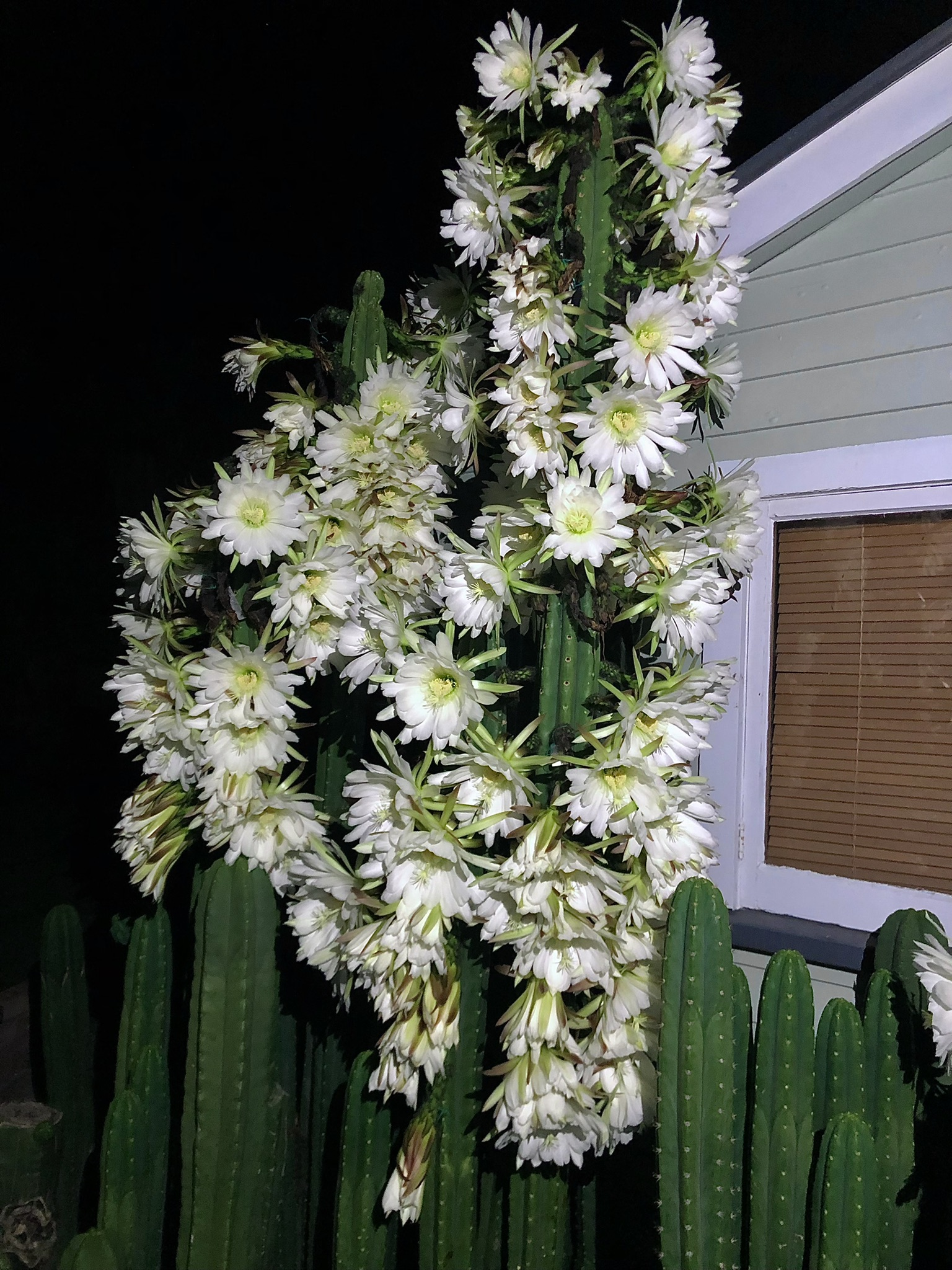

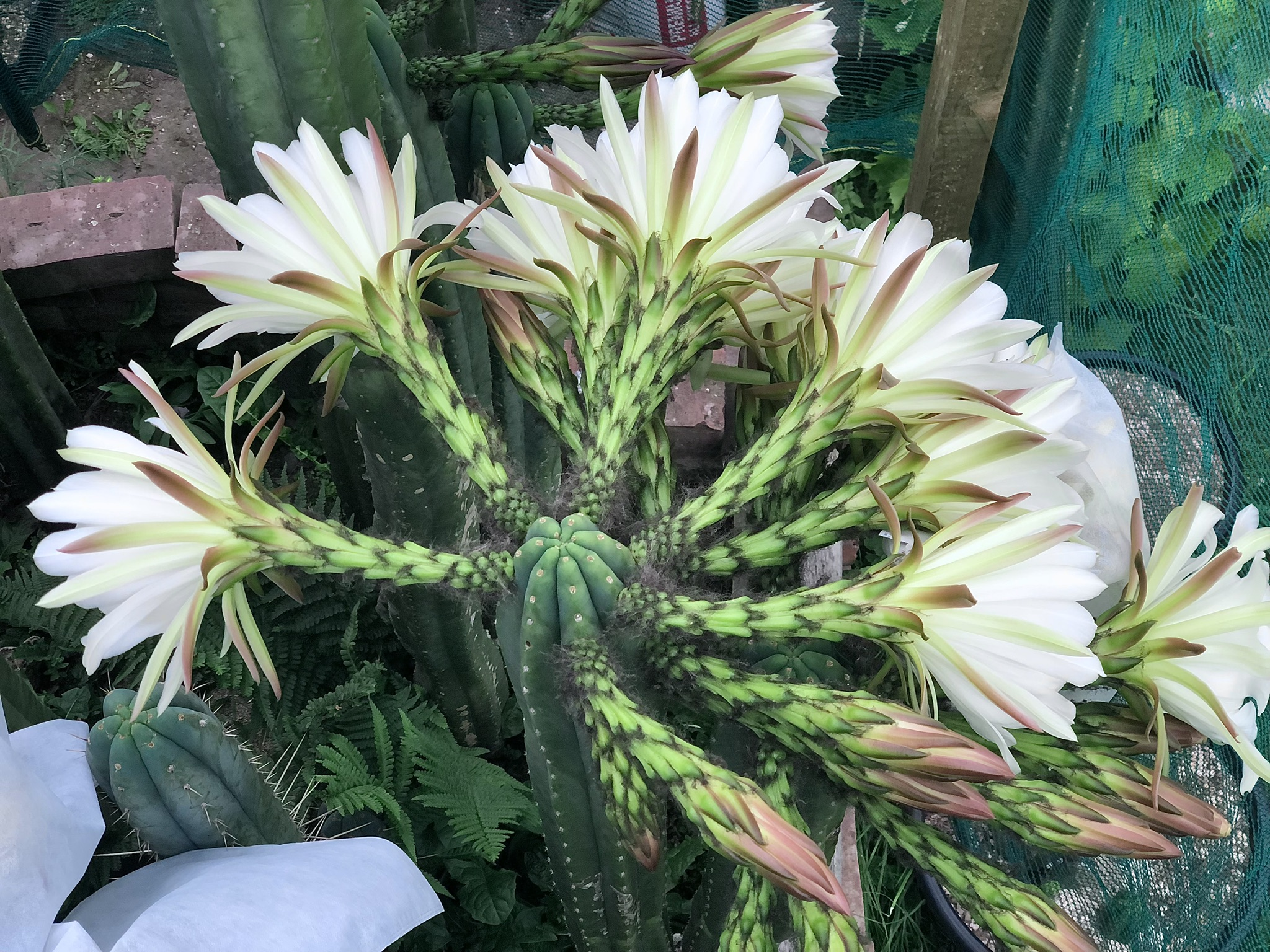

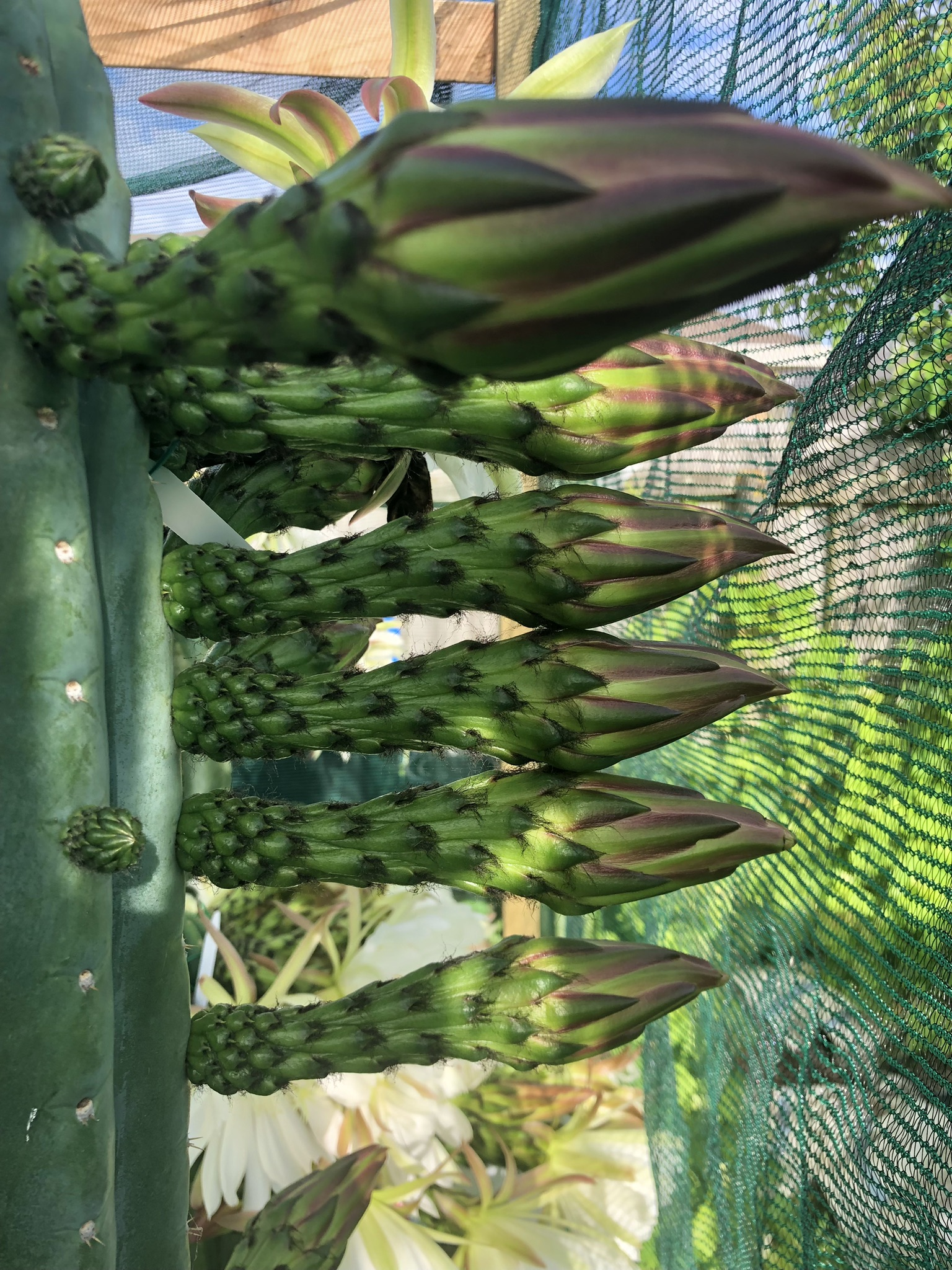

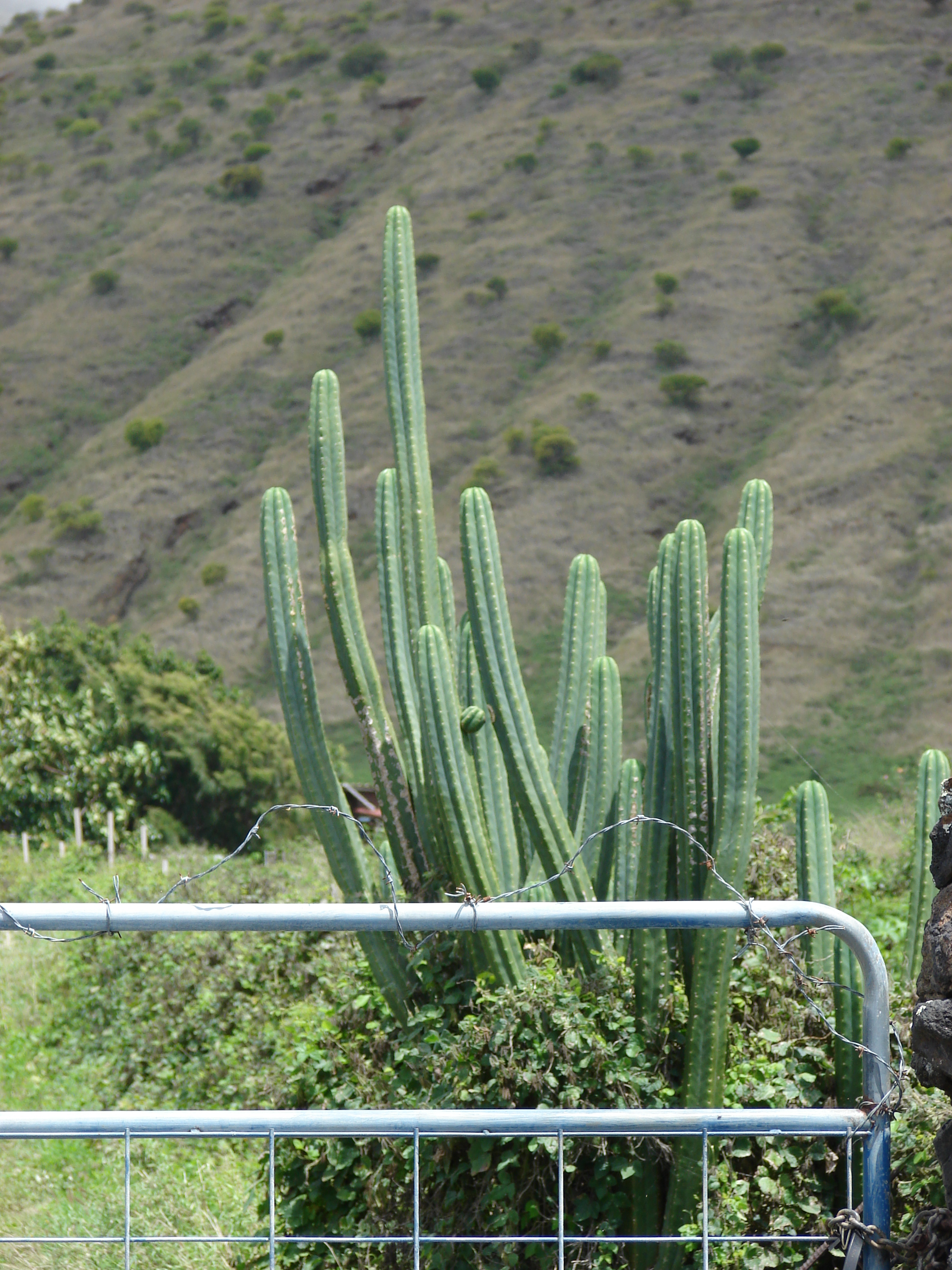

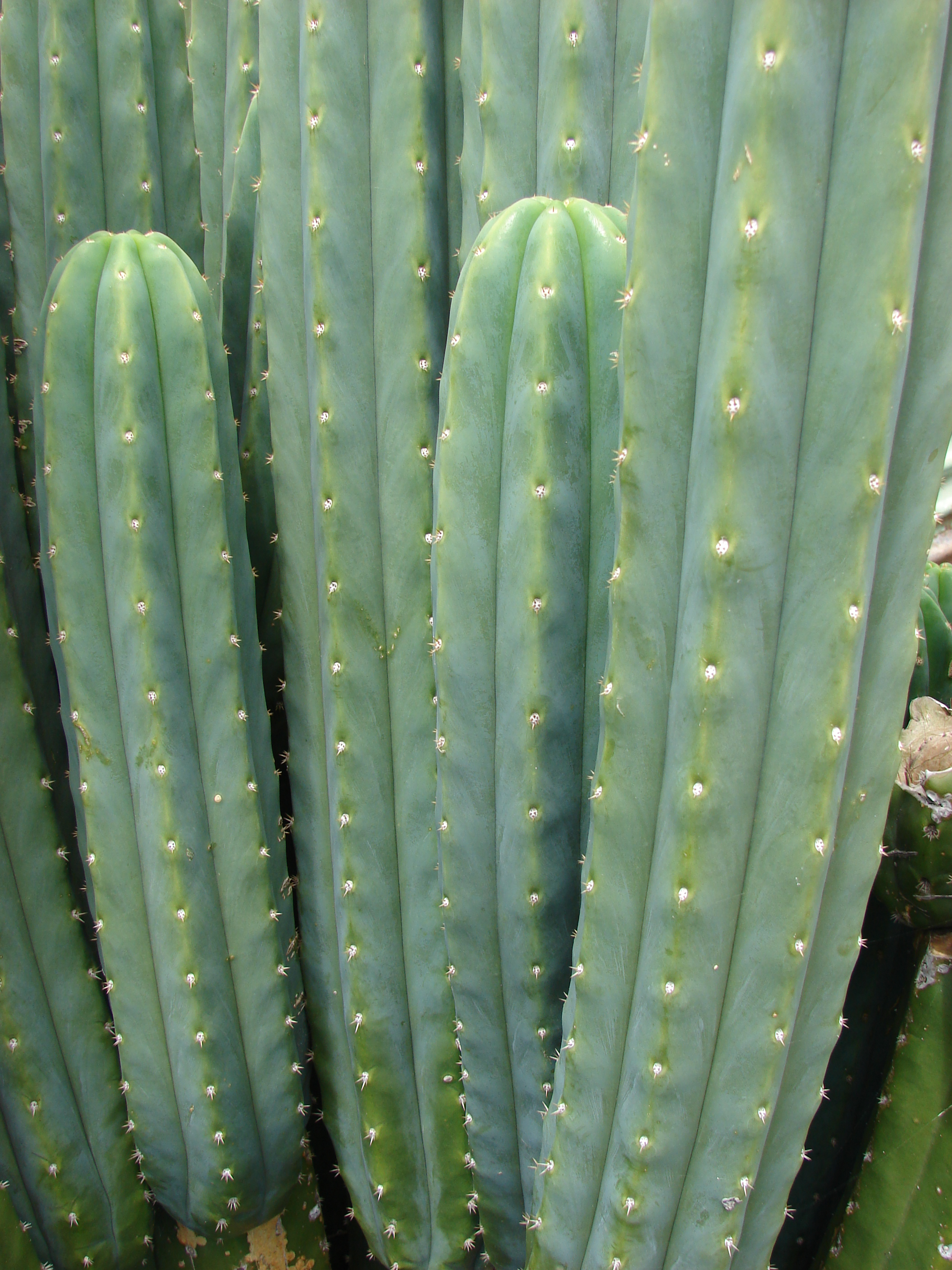

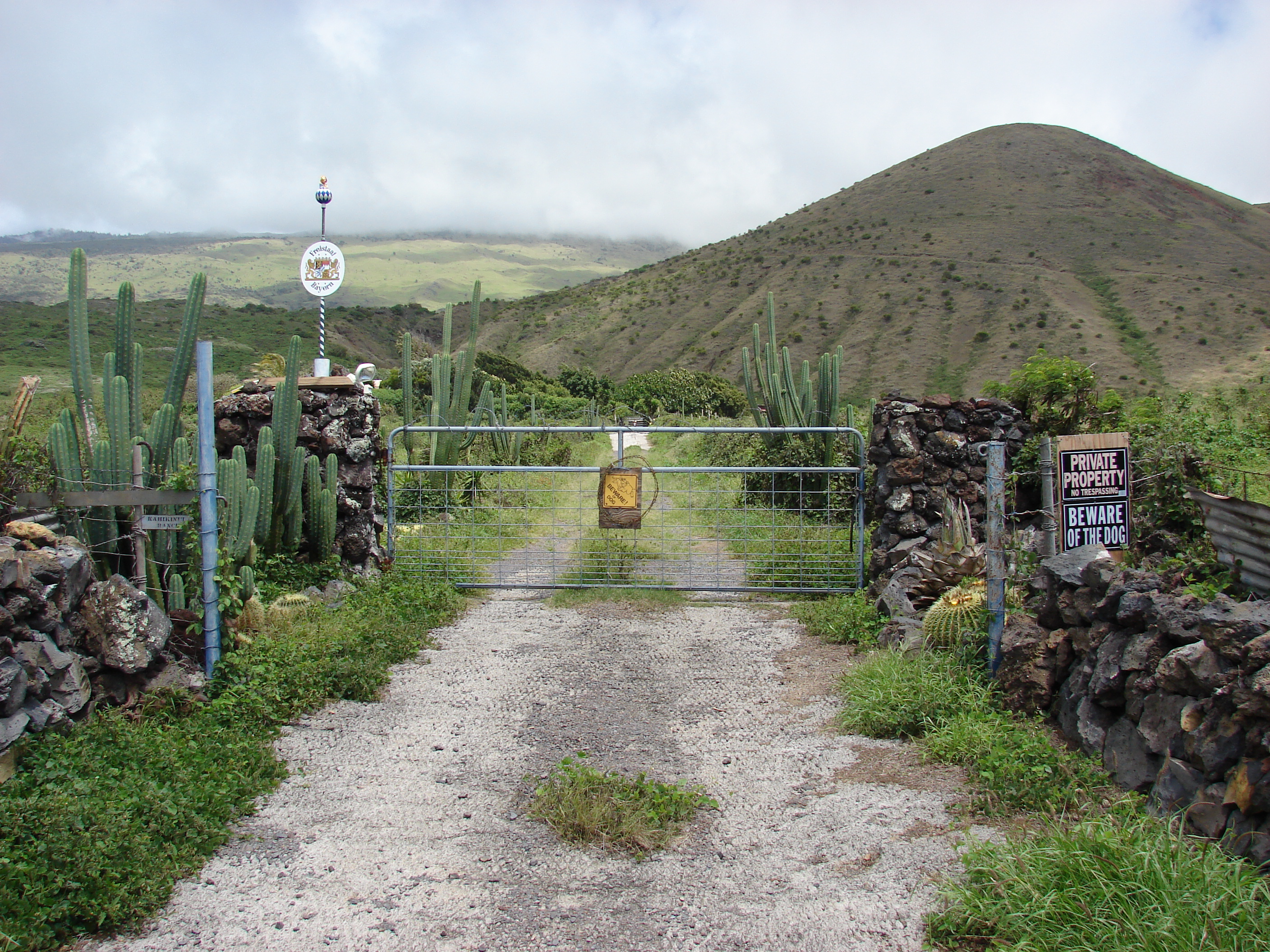

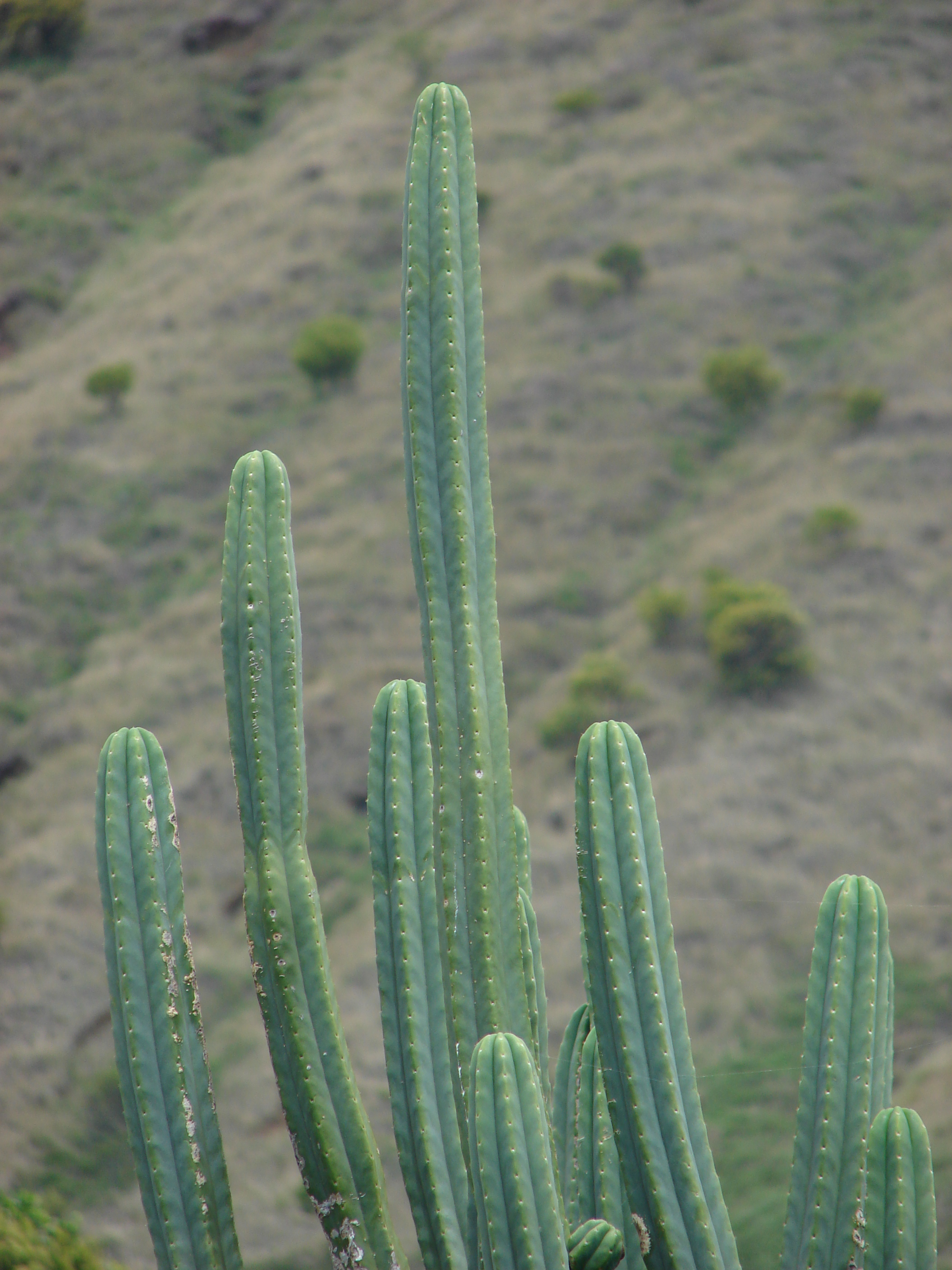

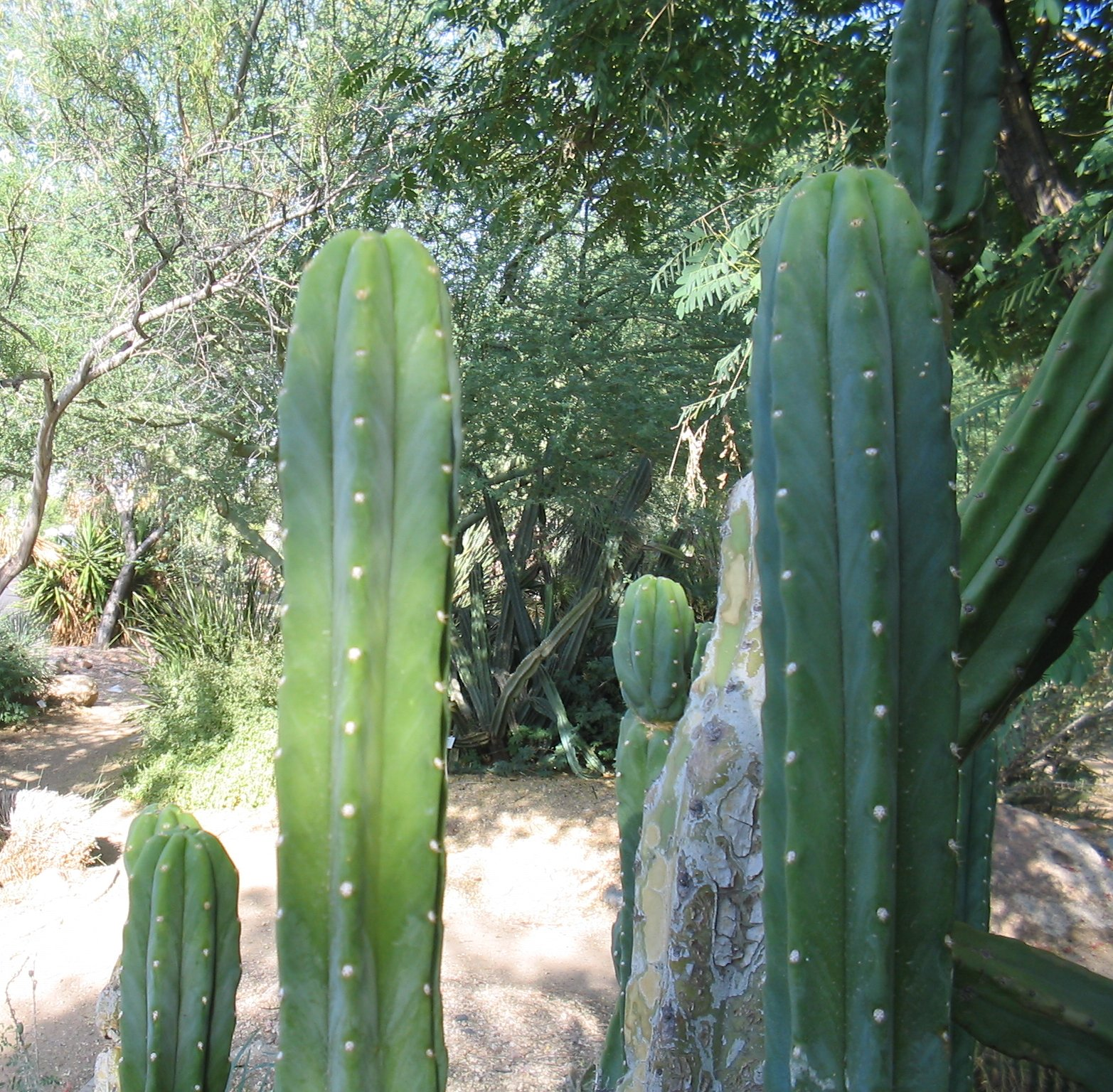

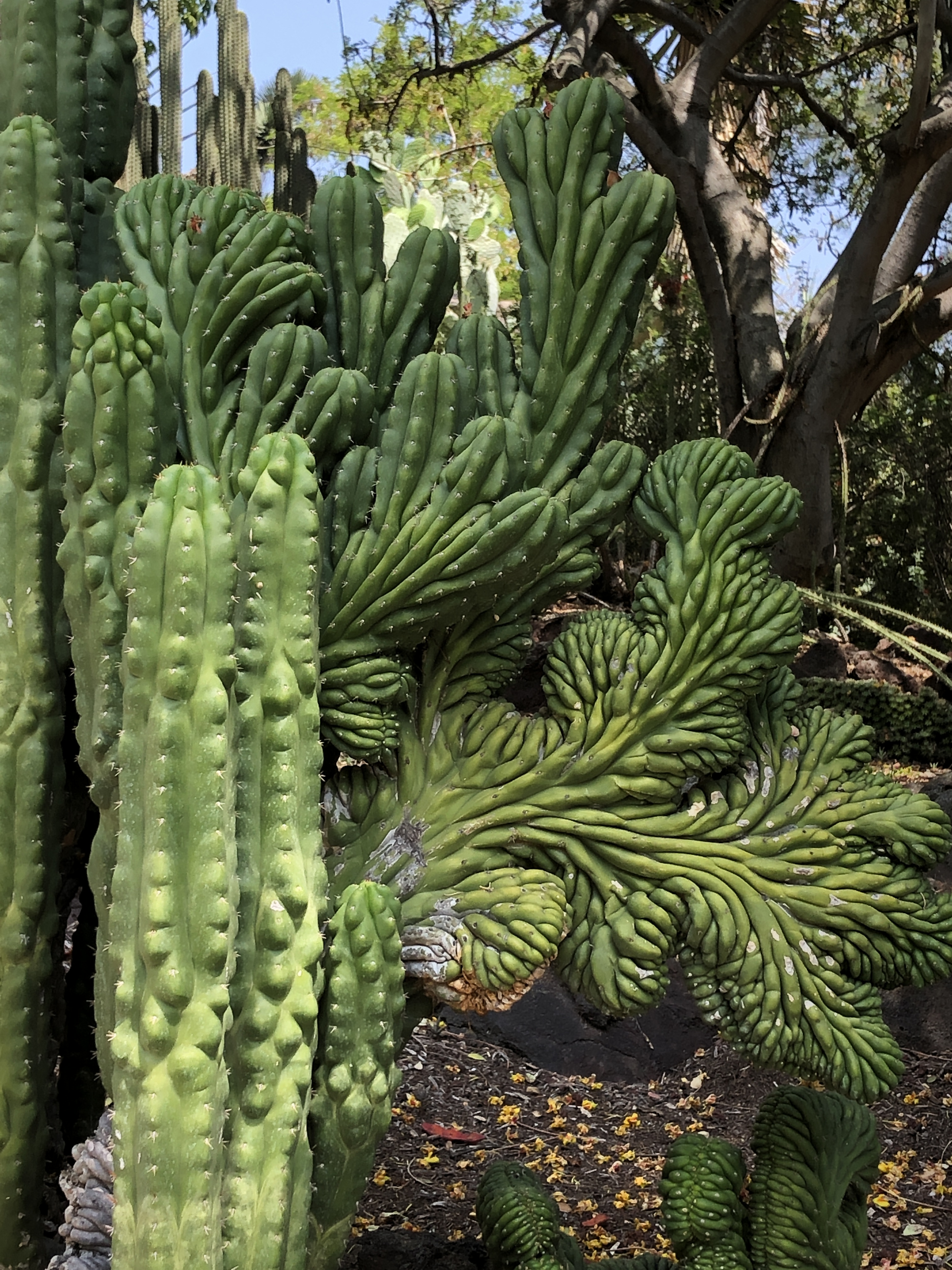

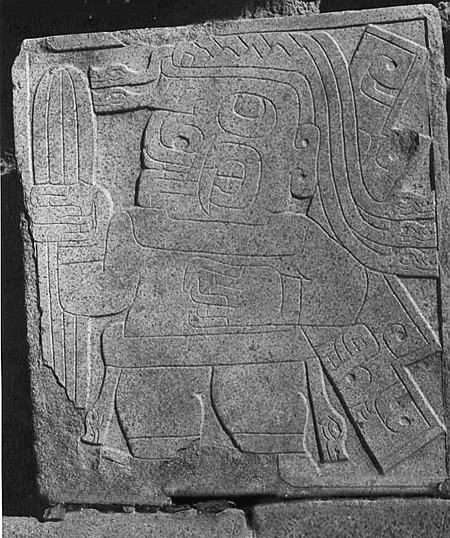

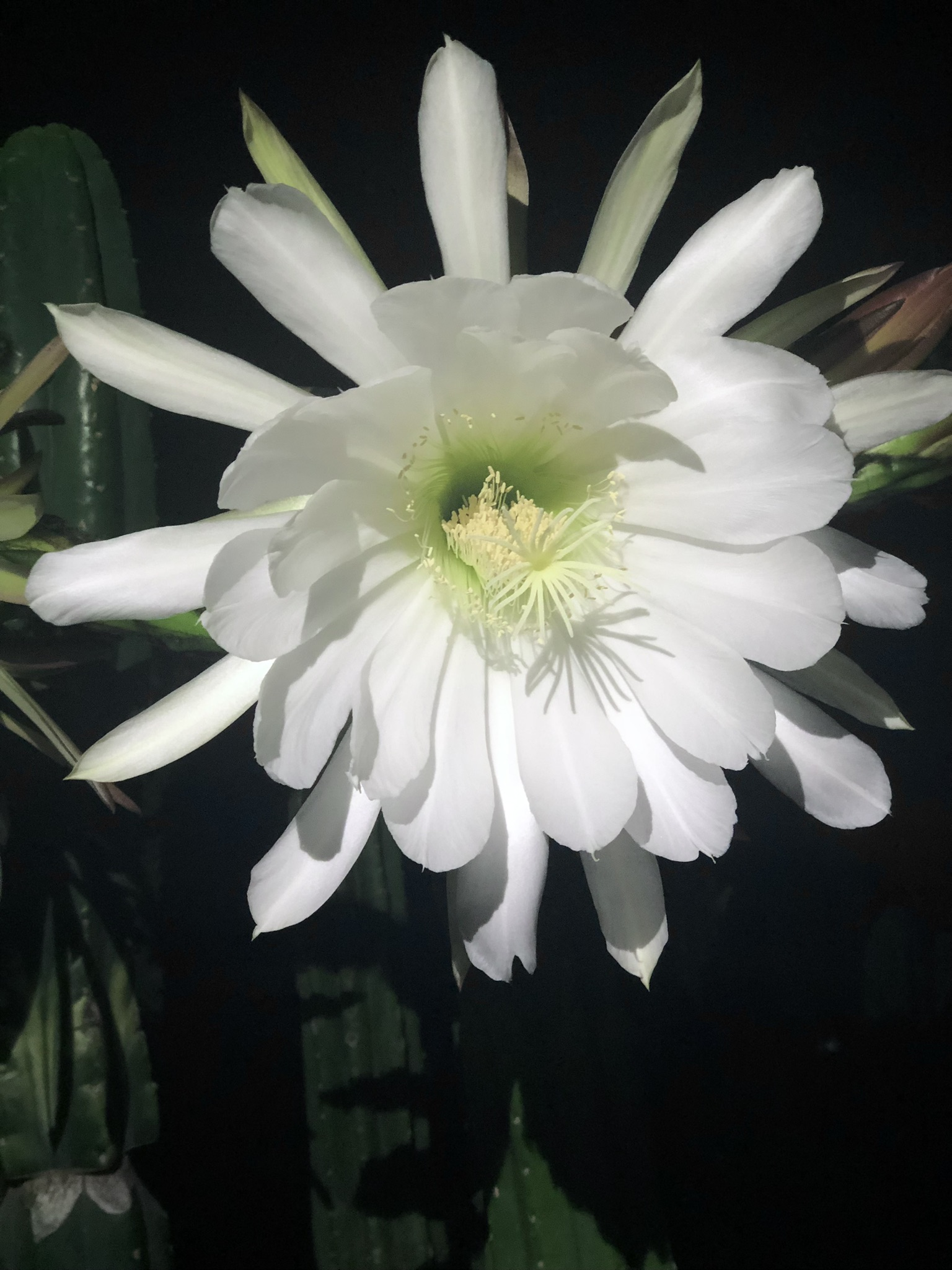

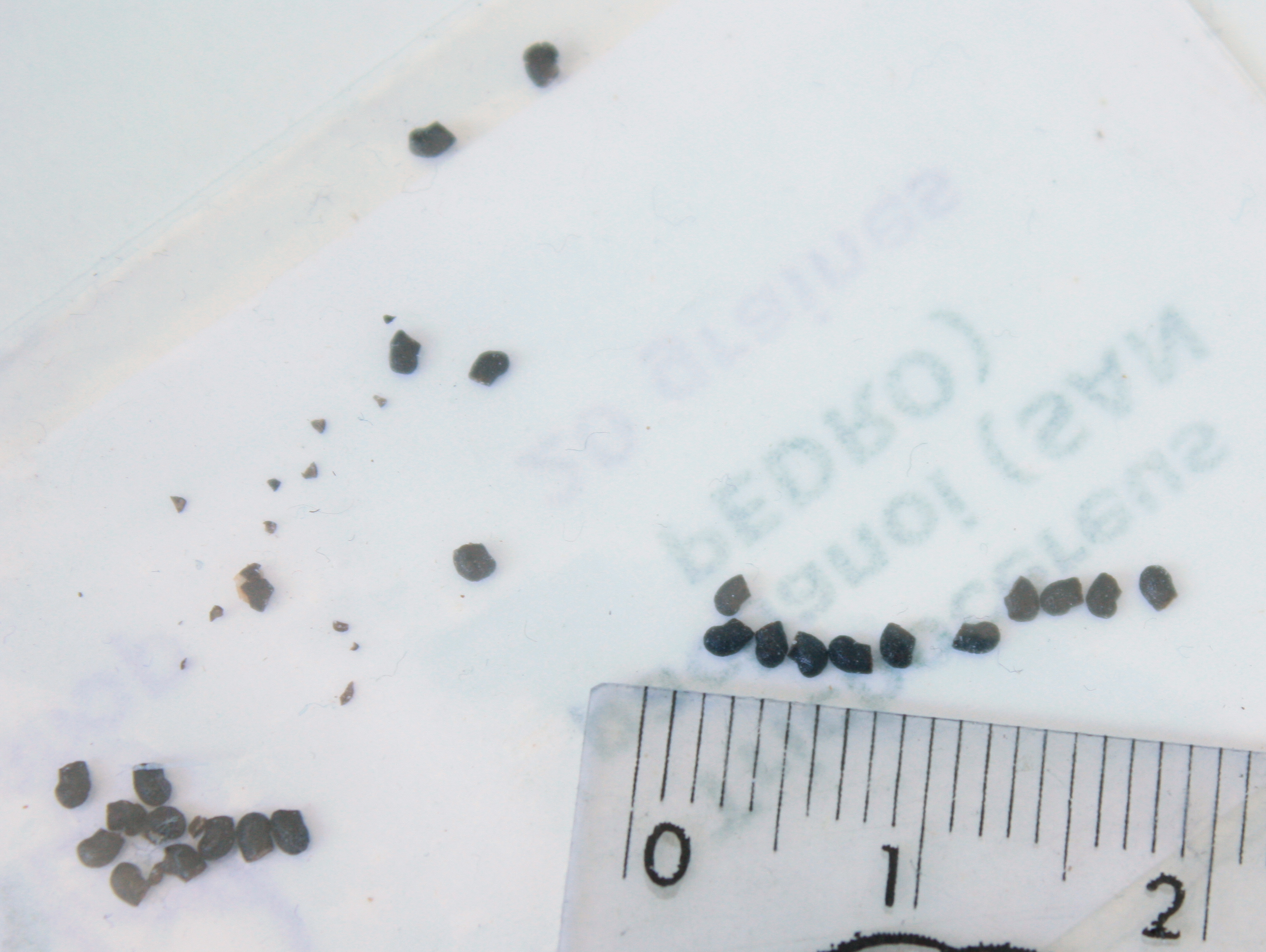
Seeds

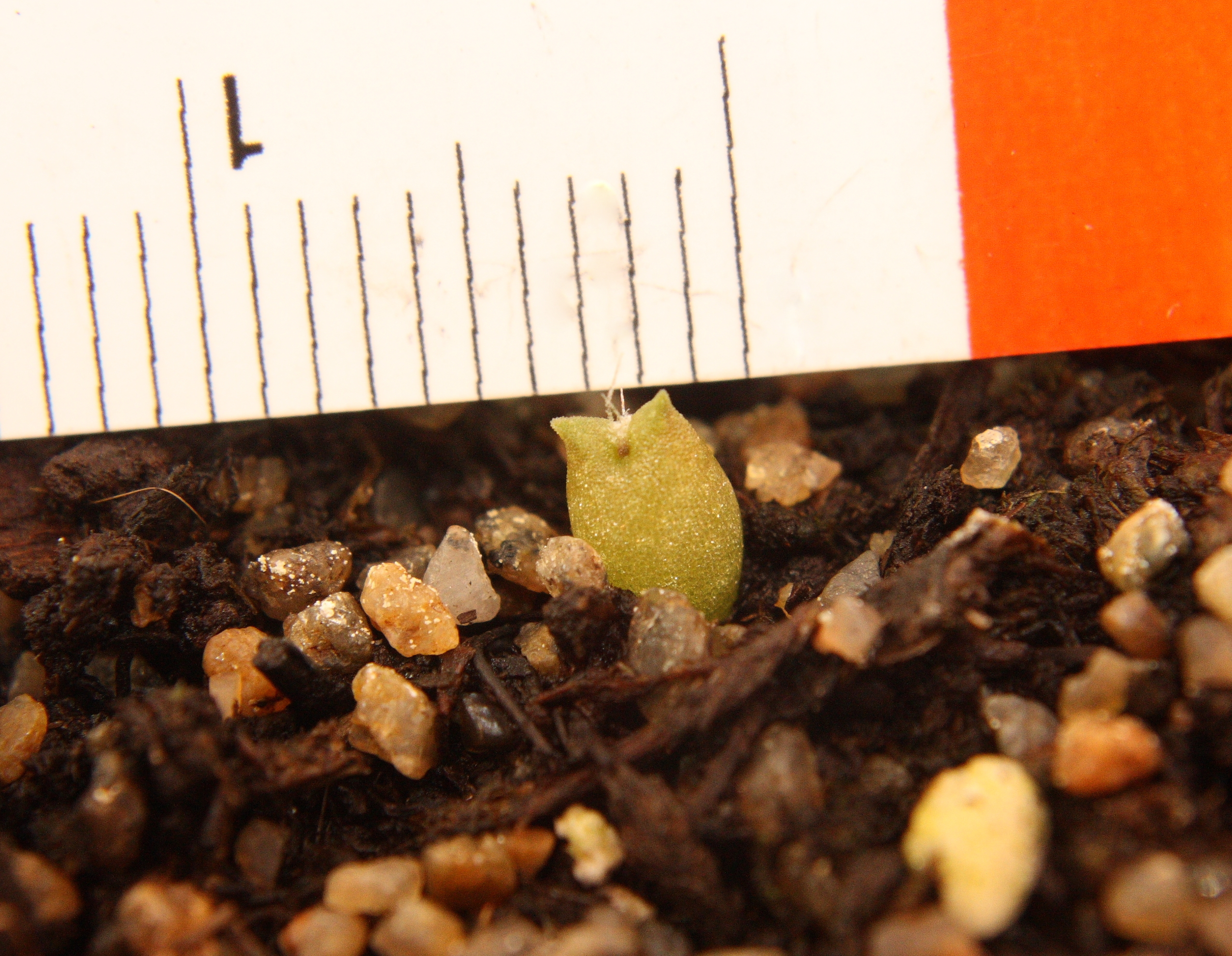
Three-week-old seedling

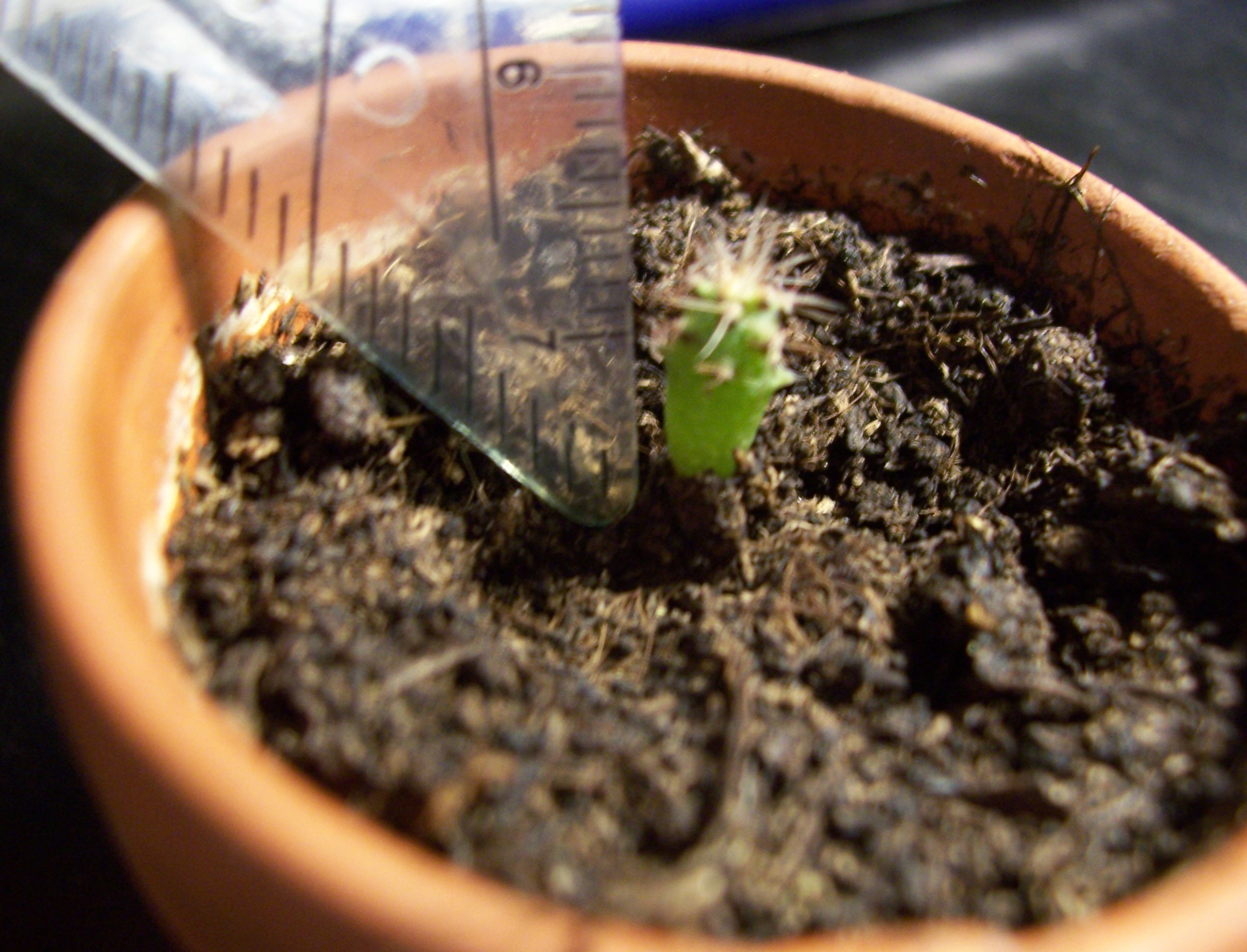
Five-month-old seedling

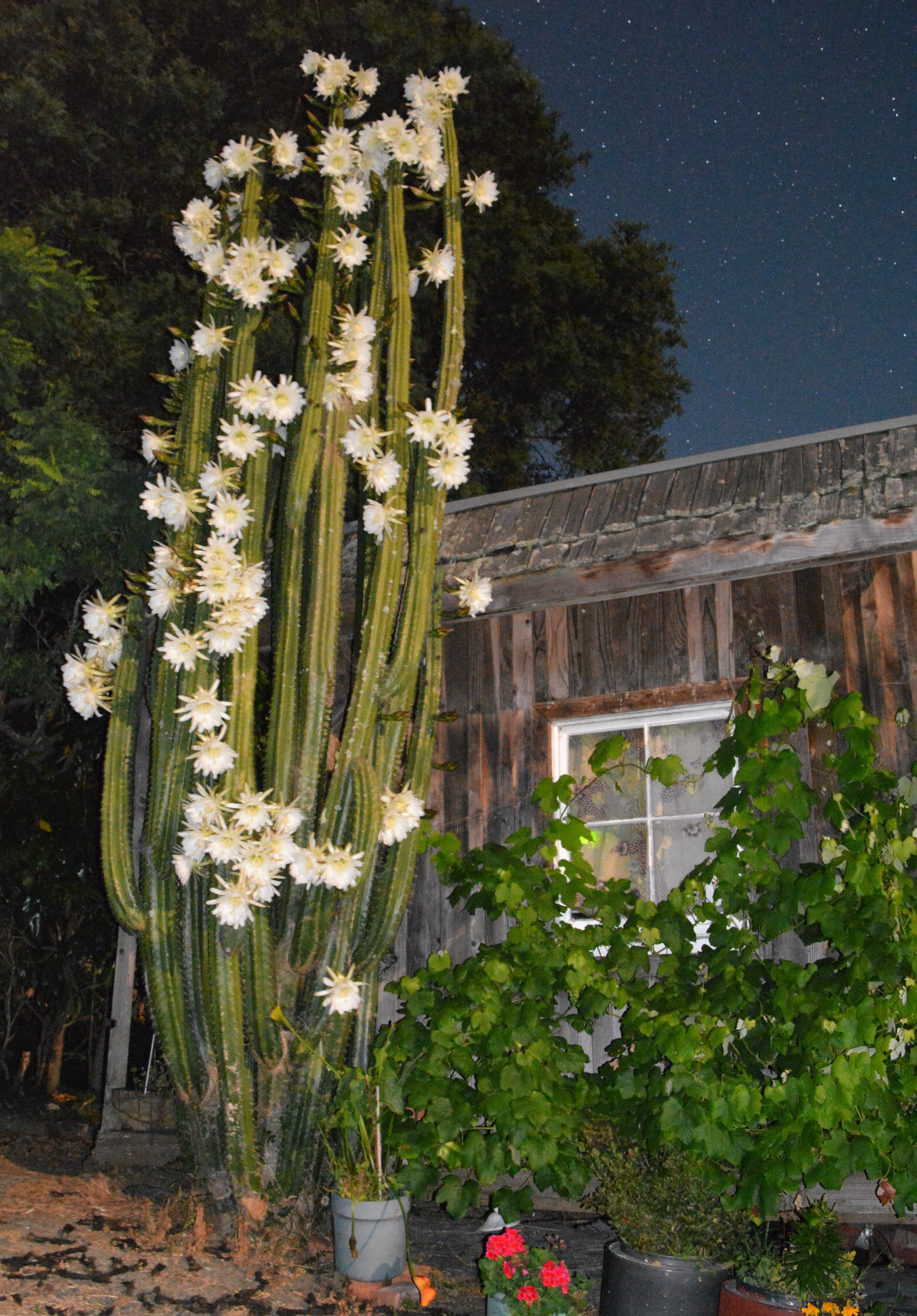

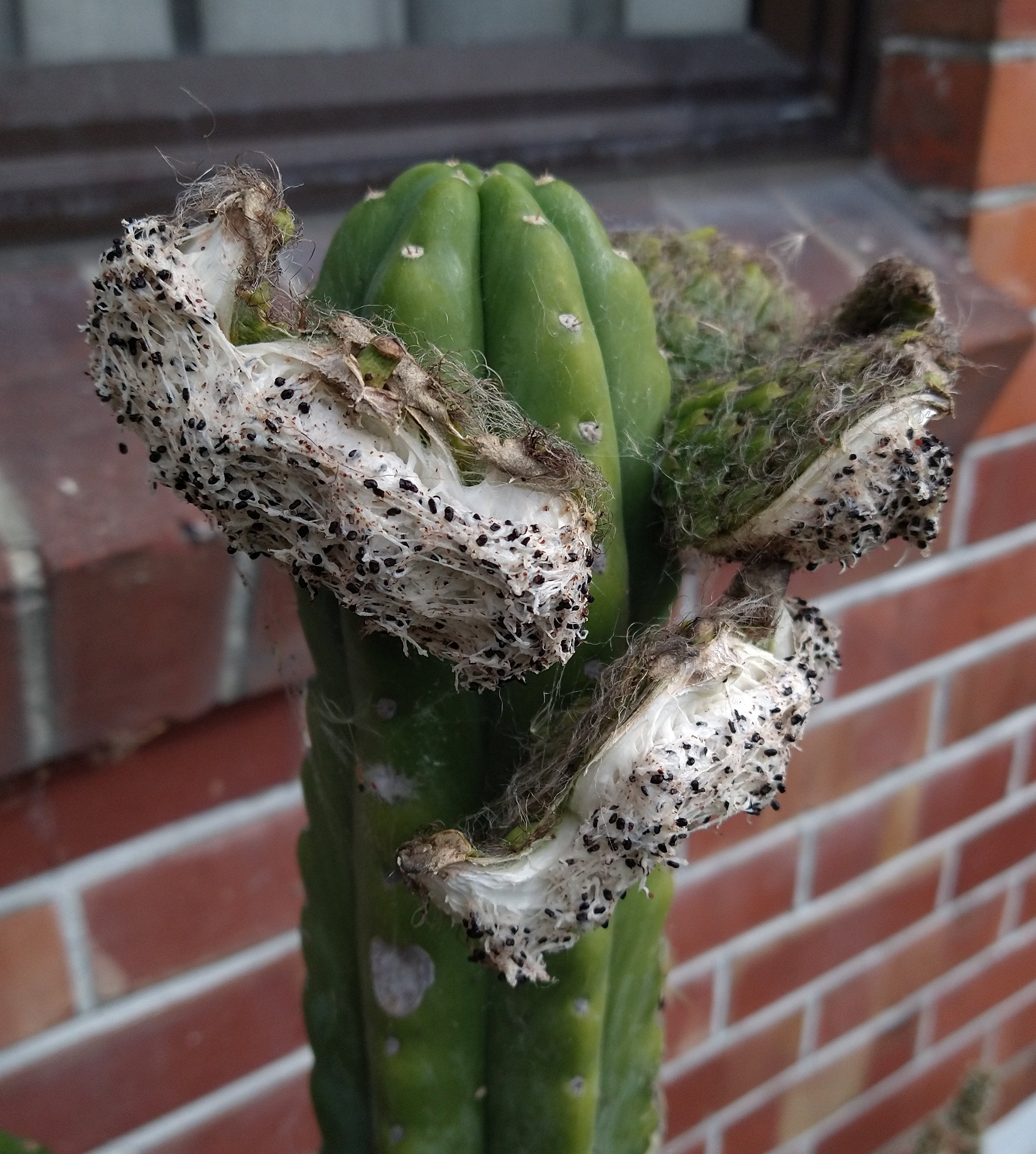
The fruit after bursting open, revealing the seeds in a sweet flesh.

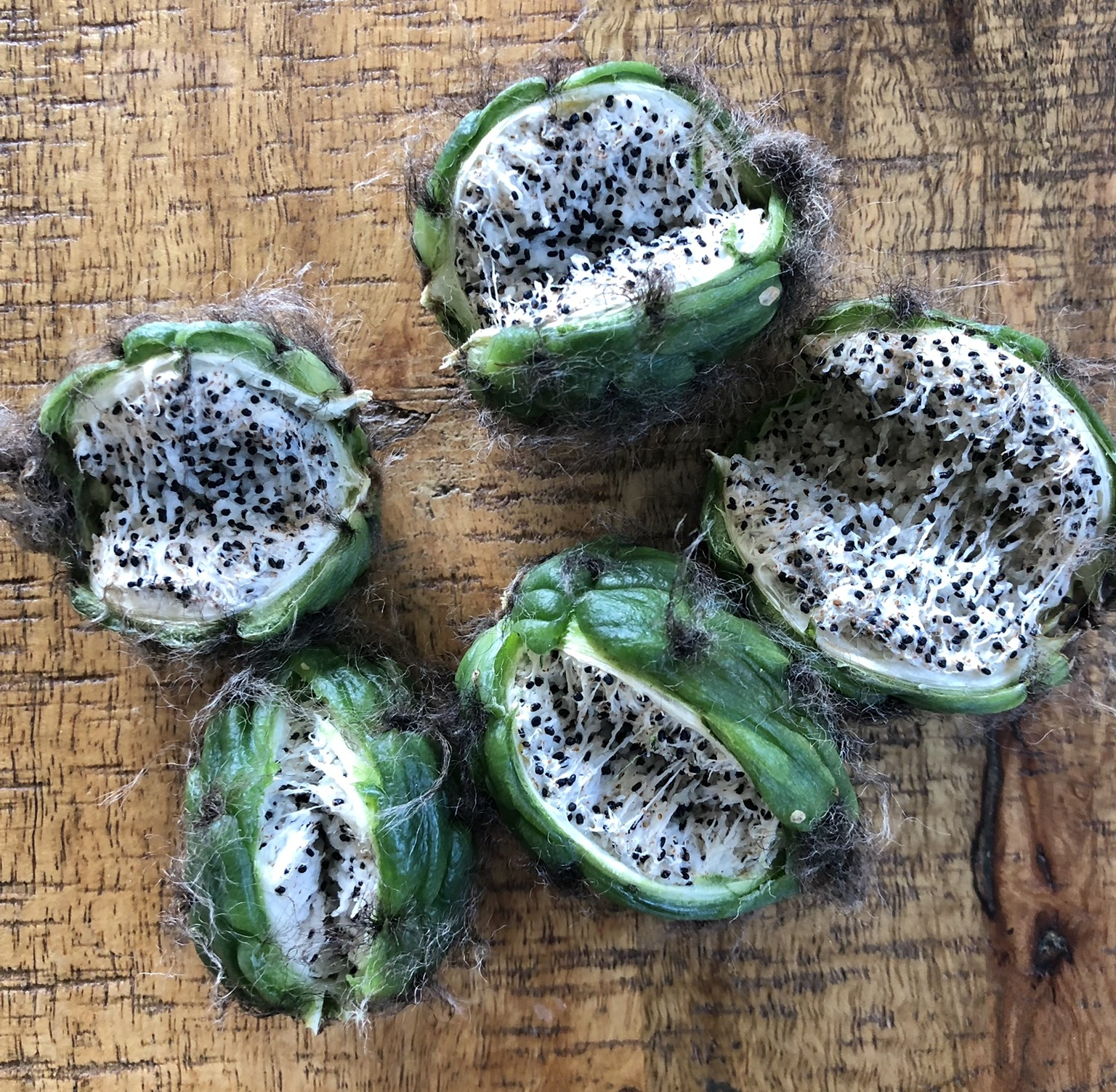
Ripe fruits

Blooming habit

== See also ==
- Ayahuasca
- Chavín de Huántar
- Cimora
- El Paraíso, Peru
- Guitarrero Cave
- List of psychoactive plants
- Psychedelic microdosing
- Stela of the cactus bearer
- Sustainable landscaping
- Xeriscaping
