= Anhalinine =

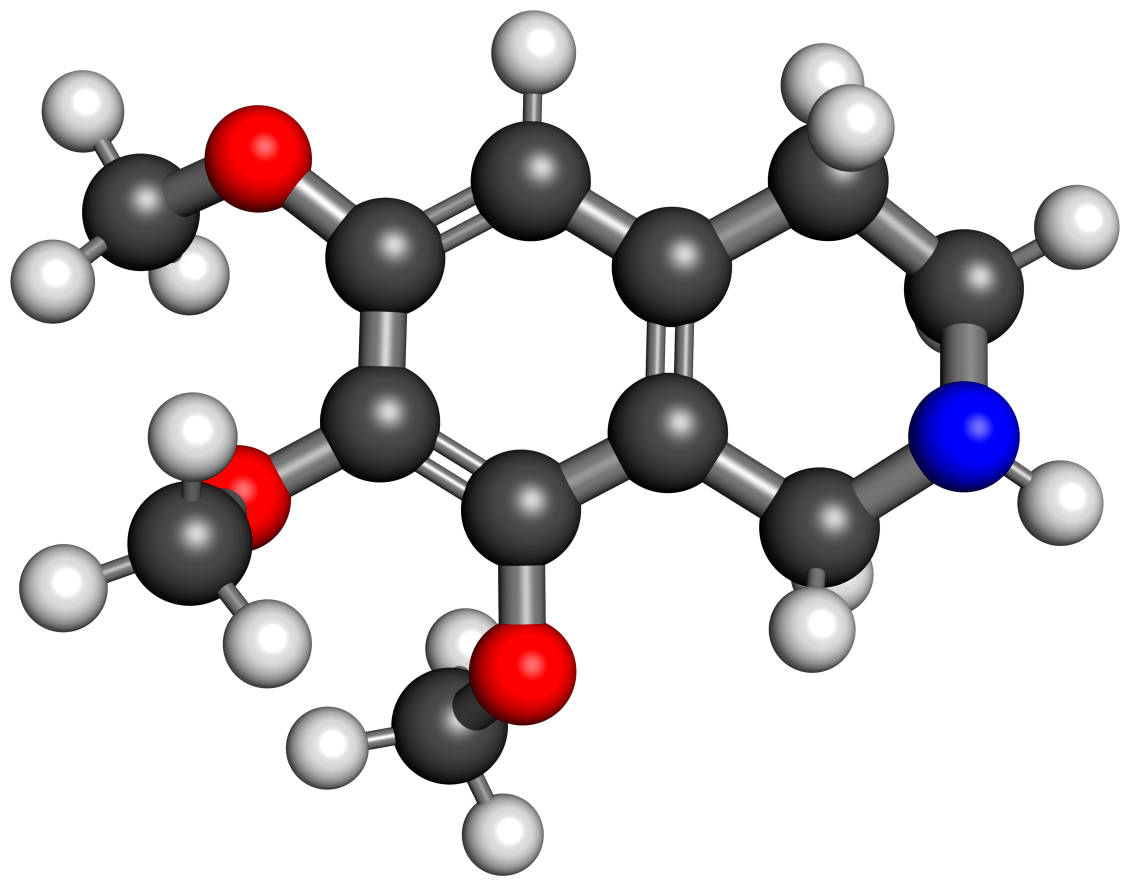

Clinical data
- Other names: O-Methylanhalamine; 6,7,8-Trimethoxy-THIQ; Anhalanine; Mescaline-CR; Mescaline-THIQ
- Drug class: Serotonin 5-HT_{7} receptor inverse agonist
- ATC code: None

Identifiers
- IUPAC name: 6,7,8-trimethoxy-1,2,3,4-tetrahydroisoquinoline
- CAS Number: 642-30-8
- PubChem CID: 192723
- ChemSpider: 167242
- UNII: JZ4K38GMN6
- ChEMBL: ChEMBL1186194
- CompTox Dashboard (EPA): DTXSID10982742

Chemical and physical data
- Formula: C_{12}H_{17}NO_{3}
- Molar mass: 223.272 g·mol^{−1}
- 3D model (JSmol): Interactive image
- Melting point: 60 to 61 °C (140 to 142 °F)
- Boiling point: 144 to 145 °C (291 to 293 °F) (at 0.1 Torr)
- SMILES: COC1=C(C(=C2CNCCC2=C1)OC)OC
- InChI: InChI=1S/C12H17NO3/c1-14-10-6-8-4-5-13-7-9(8)11(15-2)12(10)16-3/h6,13H,4-5,7H2,1-3H3; Key:GOBKARNYNSWQFZ-UHFFFAOYSA-N

Anhalinine, also known as O-methylanhalamine or mescaline-CR, is a tetrahydroisoquinoline alkaloid found in Lophophora williamsii (peyote) and other cacti. It is structurally related to mescaline and is a cyclized phenethylamine analogue of mescaline. Anhalinine is also pharmacologically active, but is only a minor constituent of peyote and is unlikely to contribute to its effects.

== Use and effects ==
Alexander Shulgin tried anhalinine at small doses of 0.5 to 4.3 mg but experienced no effects.

== Pharmacology ==
=== Pharmacodynamics ===
Simple tetrahydroisoquinoline alkaloids of mescaline-containing cacti like anhalinine have received relatively little investigation. Arthur Heffter found several of them to produce no effects similar to those of mescaline. However, some of them have been found to produce convulsions in animals at high doses. Anhalinine specifically has been described as having "stimulant" properties due to inhibiting cholinergic neurotransmission.

Anhalinine has since been found to act as a low-potency inverse agonist of the serotonin 5-HT_{7} receptor, with an EC_{50} of 2,722 nM and an E_{max} of –85%. This was much less potent in terms of this action than certain other tetrahydroisoquinolines like pellotine and anhalidine. Serotonin 5-HT_{7} receptor inverse agonism might be involved in the sedative and hypnotic effects of certain peyote alkaloids like pellotine and anhalonidine.

== Chemistry ==
=== Synthesis ===
The chemical synthesis of anhalinine has been described.

=== Analogues ===
Analogues of anhalinine include anhalamine, anhalidine, anhalonidine, gigantine, and pellotine, among others. Derivatives of anhalinine include N-methylanhalinine, O-methylanhalonidine (1-methylanhalinine), and O-methylpellotine (1,N-dimethylanhalinine), norweberine, weberine, and pachycereine, among others.

Cyclized tetrahydroisoquinoline analogues of other psychoactive phenethylamines, besides anhalinine (mescaline-CR), are also known, for instance AMPH-CR, METH-CR, PMMA-CR, DOM-CR, DOB-CR, MDA-CR, and MDMA-CR, among others. In general, cyclization into tetrahydroisoquinolines results in abolition of their defining psychoactive effects and activities. However, some tetrahydroisoquinolines show interactions with α_{2}-adrenergic receptors and serotonin 5-HT_{1D}, 5-HT_{6}, and/or 5-HT_{7} receptors as well as effects related to these actions.

== Natural occurrence ==
Anhalinine has been isolated from numerous species of cactus, including Gymnocalycium, Lophophora, Pelecyphora, and Turbinicarpus species. Depending on the species and methodology, the compound constitutes a total alkaloid fraction of 0.44 to 2.7% in Lophophora species, 2.88% in Pelecyphora pseudopectinata, and 0.15 to 39.57% in Turbinicarpus species.

== History ==
Anhalinine was first isolated from peyote by Ernst Späth in 1935. Shulgin bioassayed it in 1963.

== See also ==
- Substituted tetrahydroisoquinoline
- Cyclized phenethylamine
