= Peyotine =

Names
- IUPAC name 8-Hydroxy-6,7-dimethoxy-1,2,2-trimethyl-1,2,3,4-tetrahydroisoquinolin-2-ium
- Other names 8-Hydroxy-6,7-dimethoxy-1,2,2-trimethyl-1,2,3,4-tetrahydroisoquinoline; 8-Hydroxy-6,7-dimethoxy-1,2,2-trimethyl-THIQ

Identifiers
CAS Number	25526-36-7
3D model (JSmol)	Interactive image; RS: Interactive image
ChEMBL	ChEMBL3558643
ChemSpider	17574430
PubChem CID	16638313
CompTox Dashboard (EPA)	DTXSID001139925
- InChI: InChI=1S/C14H21NO3/c1-9-12-10(6-7-15(9,2)3)8-11(17-4)14(18-5)13(12)16/h8-9H,6-7H2,1-5H3/p+1/t9-/m0/s1 Key: ZARLYMQBOSEMJI-VIFPVBQESA-O; RS: InChI=1S/C14H21NO3/c1-9-12-10(6-7-15(9,2)3)8-11(17-4)14(18-5)13(12)16/h8-9H,6-7H2,1-5H3/p+1 Key: ZARLYMQBOSEMJI-UHFFFAOYSA-O
- SMILES: OC1=C2C(=CC(OC)=C1OC)CC[N+](C)(C)[C@H]2C; RS: COc1c(OC)cc2c(c1O)C(C)[N+](CC2)(C)C

Properties
Chemical formula	C_{14}H_{21}NO_{3}^{+}
Molar mass	251.325 g·mol^{−1}
- Except where otherwise noted, data are given for materials in their standard state (at 25 °C [77 °F], 100 kPa). Infobox references

Peyotine is a trace tetrahydroisoquinoline and quaternary alkaloid found in peyote (Lophophora williamsii). It is often confused with pellotine, its N-demethylated analogue, which has often been known by the same name as peyotine or by similar names like peyotina or peyotline. Peyotine was first described in the scientific literature by G. J. Kapadia and colleagues in 1968.

== See also ==
- Substituted tetrahydroisoquinoline
- Pellotine
