= Anhalamine =

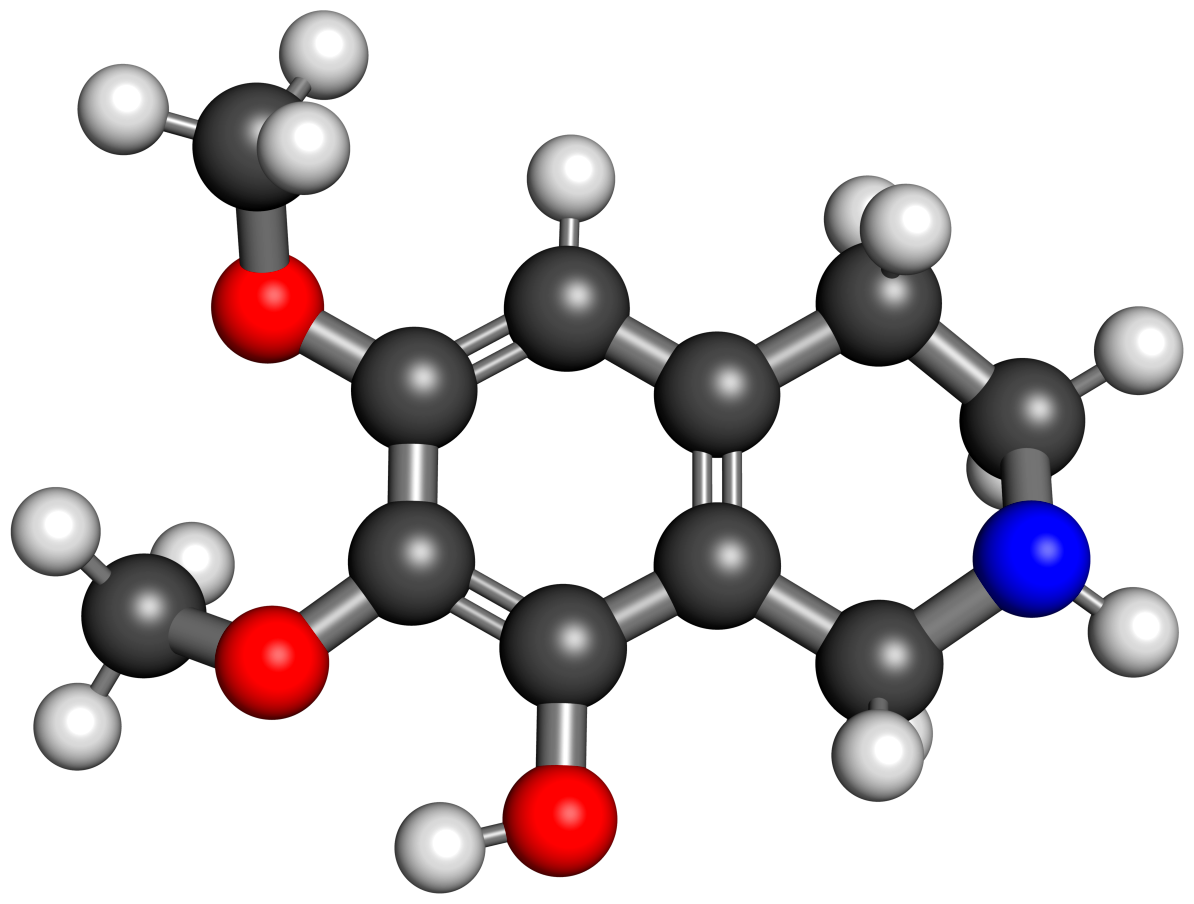

Clinical data
- Other names: 8-Hydroxy-6,7-dimethoxy-1,2,3,4-tetrahydroisoquinoline; 8-Hydroxy-6,7-dimethoxy-THIQ
- Drug class: Serotonin 5-HT_{7} receptor inverse agonist
- ATC code: None

Identifiers
- IUPAC name: 6,7-dimethoxy-1,2,3,4-tetrahydroisoquinolin-8-ol
- CAS Number: 643-60-7
- PubChem CID: 69510
- ChemSpider: 62716
- UNII: J4WH1Y00ON
- KEGG: C12231
- CompTox Dashboard (EPA): DTXSID80214527

Chemical and physical data
- Formula: C_{11}H_{15}NO_{3}
- Molar mass: 209.245 g·mol^{−1}
- 3D model (JSmol): Interactive image
- SMILES: COC1=C(C(=C2CNCCC2=C1)O)OC
- InChI: InChI=1S/C11H15NO3/c1-14-9-5-7-3-4-12-6-8(7)10(13)11(9)15-2/h5,12-13H,3-4,6H2,1-2H3; Key:DVQVXTPSJBCBJI-UHFFFAOYSA-N

Anhalamine is a naturally occurring tetrahydroisoquinoline alkaloid which can be isolated from Lophophora williamsii. It is structurally related to mescaline. It has been found to act as a potent inverse agonist of the serotonin 5-HT_{7} receptor.

== See also ==
- Substituted tetrahydroisoquinoline
- Anhalinine
- Anhalonidine
- Pellotine
