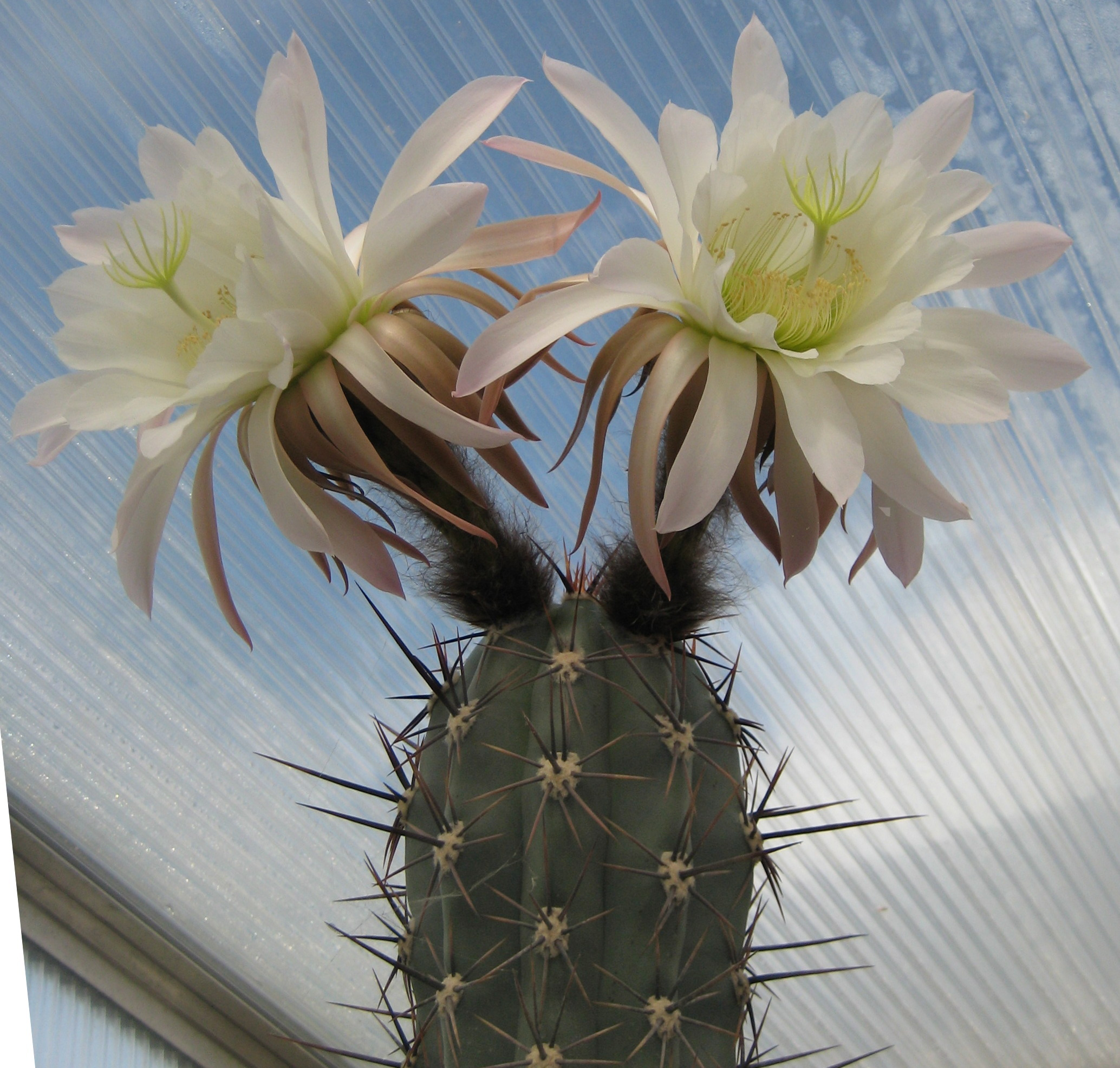

Conservation status
- Least Concern (IUCN 3.1)

Scientific classification
- Kingdom: Plantae
- Clade: Tracheophytes
- Clade: Angiosperms
- Clade: Eudicots
- Order: Caryophyllales
- Family: Cactaceae
- Subfamily: Cactoideae
- Genus: Echinopsis
- Species: E. tacaquirensis

Binomial name
- Echinopsis tacaquirensis (Vaupel) Friedrich & G.D. Rowley 1974

Synonyms
- Cereus tacaquirensis Vaupel 1916; Trichocereus tacaquirensis (Vaupel) Cardenas 1959

= Echinopsis tacaquirensis =

Species of cactus

Echinopsis tacaquirensis, is a species of Echinopsis cactus found in Bolivia.

== Description ==
Echinopsis tacaquirensis grows as a shrub, branches out from the base with crowded, ascending twigs and reaches heights of growth of up to 2.5 metres. The robust, cylindrical, dark green shoots can reach a diameter of up to 15 cm (5.9 in) with up to nine ribs that are up to 2 cm (0.79 in) high. The large areoles located on them are white and are up to 1.5 cm (0.59 in) apart. The spines emerging from them can occasionally not be clearly distinguished into central spines and radial spines. The radial spines are white to pink to blackish are bristly to needle-like and sometimes intertwined. They have a length 1 of 6 cm (2.4 in).

The funnel-shaped flowers are white to pale pink and up to 23 cm (9.1 in) long. Your flower tube is hairy brown. The dark green fruits have a diameter of up to 4 cm (1.6 in).

== Distribution ==
Echinopsis tacaquirensis is found in southern Bolivia at altitudes of 2000 to 3500 meters.

== Taxonomy ==
The first description as Cereus tacaquirensis by Friedrich Vaupel was published in 1916. Curt Backeberg placed the species in the genus Trichocereus in 1959. Another nomenclature synonym is Trichocereus tacaquirensis (Vaupel) Cárdenas ex Backeb. Trichocereus taquimbalensis is considered a subspecies of the closely related species Trichocereus tacaquirensis.
