= Pellotine =

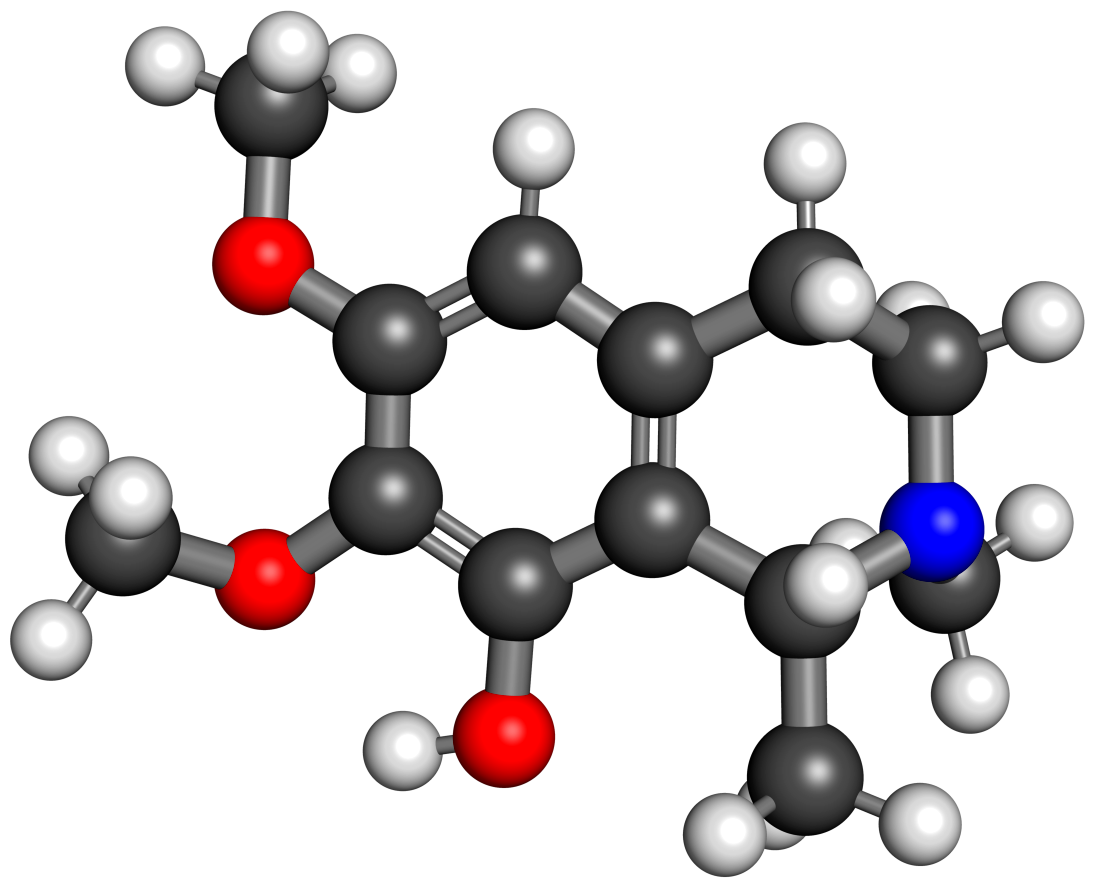

Clinical data
- Other names: Pellotin; Peyotline; Peyotlin; N-Methylanhalonidine; 8-Hydroxy-6,7-dimethoxy-1,2-dimethyl-1,2,3,4-tetrahydroisoquinoline; 8-Hydroxy-6,7-dimethoxy-1,2-dimethyl-THIQ
- Routes of administration: Oral, subcutaneous injection
- Drug class: Serotonin 5-HT_{6} receptor weak partial agonist; Serotonin 5-HT_{7} receptor inverse agonist; Serotonin 5-HT_{1D} receptor ligand; Sedative; Hypnotic
- ATC code: None

Identifiers
- IUPAC name: 6,7-dimethoxy-1,2-dimethyl-3,4-dihydro-1H-isoquinolin-8-ol
- CAS Number: 83-14-7
- PubChem CID: 65742
- ChemSpider: 59165
- UNII: 7RW0YY488A
- CompTox Dashboard (EPA): DTXSID50871560

Chemical and physical data
- Formula: C_{13}H_{19}NO_{3}
- Molar mass: 237.299 g·mol^{−1}
- 3D model (JSmol): Interactive image
- Melting point: 110 to 113 °C (230 to 235 °F)
- SMILES: CC1C2=C(C(=C(C=C2CCN1C)OC)OC)O
- InChI: InChI=1S/C13H19NO3/c1-8-11-9(5-6-14(8)2)7-10(16-3)13(17-4)12(11)15/h7-8,15H,5-6H2,1-4H3; Key:NKHMWHLJHODBEP-UHFFFAOYSA-N

Pellotine, also known as peyotline or N-methylanhalonidine, is a tetrahydroisoquinoline alkaloid found in Lophophora species, in particular Lophophora diffusa (false peyote) and to a much lesser extent Lophophora williamsii (peyote). It produces sedative and hypnotic effects and may contribute to the non-hallucinogenic effects of peyote. The drug was once marketed for medical use as a hypnotic in the 1890s, but was abandoned in favor of cheaper barbiturates in the 1900s. Pellotine has also been sold online on chemical trading platforms in modern times.

== Use and effects ==
Pellotine has been studied in humans and found to produce hypnotic effects in clinical studies. When injected subcutaneously to humans, participants have reported drowsiness and a desire not to exert any physical or mental effort. It is also reported to lower blood pressure and heart rate. Pellotine produced no hallucinogenic effects in humans at doses of up to 240 mg. However, it has been reported to have a calming or sedative effect instead. On the other hand, one single study reported that pellotine produced hallucinations at a dose of 300 mg.

== Side effects ==
Side effects of pellotine include dizziness, nausea, vertigo, and vomiting.

== Pharmacology ==
=== Pharmacodynamics ===
Pellotine has been identified as a selective and potent serotonin 5-HT_{6} receptor weak partial agonist, serotonin 5-HT_{7} receptor inverse agonist, and serotonin 5-HT_{1D} receptor ligand. It also showed weak affinity for other serotonin receptors, including for the serotonin 5-HT_{2A} receptor (59.9% binding inhibition at 10 μM). In rodents, pellotine dose-dependently produces hypolocomotion, inhibits REM sleep, and promotes sleep fragmentation. The hypnotic effects of pellotine may be mediated by interactions with serotonin receptors. Doses of 8 to 10 mg of isolated pellotine are known to cause convulsions in frogs.

== Chemistry ==
=== Synthesis ===
The chemical synthesis of pellotine has been described.

=== Analogues ===
Analogues of pellotine include anhalamine, anhalidine, anhalinine, anhalonidine, and gigantine, among others.

== Natural occurrence ==
Pellotine has been isolated from numerous species of cactus, including Gymnocalycium, Lophophora, Turbinicarpus species, among others. It is the major alkaloid in Lophophora diffusa (false peyote), where it makes up 86% to more than 90% of alkaloid content. On the other hand, it is the second most common alkaloid found in Lophophora williamsii (peyote), constituting 17 to 18% of alkaloid content. For comparison, other alkaloid contents in peyote are mescaline 30%, anhalonidine 14%, anhalamine 8%, hordenine 8%, and lophophorine 5%. Pellotine is also found in large amounts Lophophora fricii (65% alkaloid content).

== History ==
Native inhabitants of north-eastern Mexico around 810 to 1070 CE (according to carbon dating) are thought to have used a number of "mescal buttons" (cacti of the genus Lophophora) containing mescaline, pellotine, and other related alkaloids. While it is known that the cytisine-containing "mescal beans" were at least ornamental, it is unclear whether "mescal buttons" were ornamental or used for their psychoactive effects.

Arthur Heffter isolated pellotine from a Lophophora, most likely Lophophora diffusa, and described it in the scientific literature in 1894. It was the first alkaloid he isolated from Lophophora. Through self-experiments, Heffter found that pellotine produced marked but short-lasting hypnotic effects. In contrast to mescaline, which he discovered later, pellotine produced no hallucinogenic effects even at high doses.

Subsequent to its discovery by Heffter, pellotine was studied as a hypnotic in several hundred patients in Europe and was manufactured and sold as a sleep aid by Boehringer und Soun (Boehringer and Sons) in Germany in the 1890s. However, it was abandoned after the barbiturates were developed and introduced in the 1900s and 1910s. This was related to these synthetic compounds being inexpensive to make, whereas pellotine required costly and tedious isolation from peyote that it made it impractical. In addition, pellotine was said to be not the most reliable or consistent sleep aid, and its effects were quite short-lived.

== Society and culture ==
=== Names ===
Pellotine and peyotine are sometimes confused.

== See also ==
- Substituted tetrahydroisoquinoline
- Cyclized phenethylamine
- Hydrocotarnine
