= Anhalonidine =

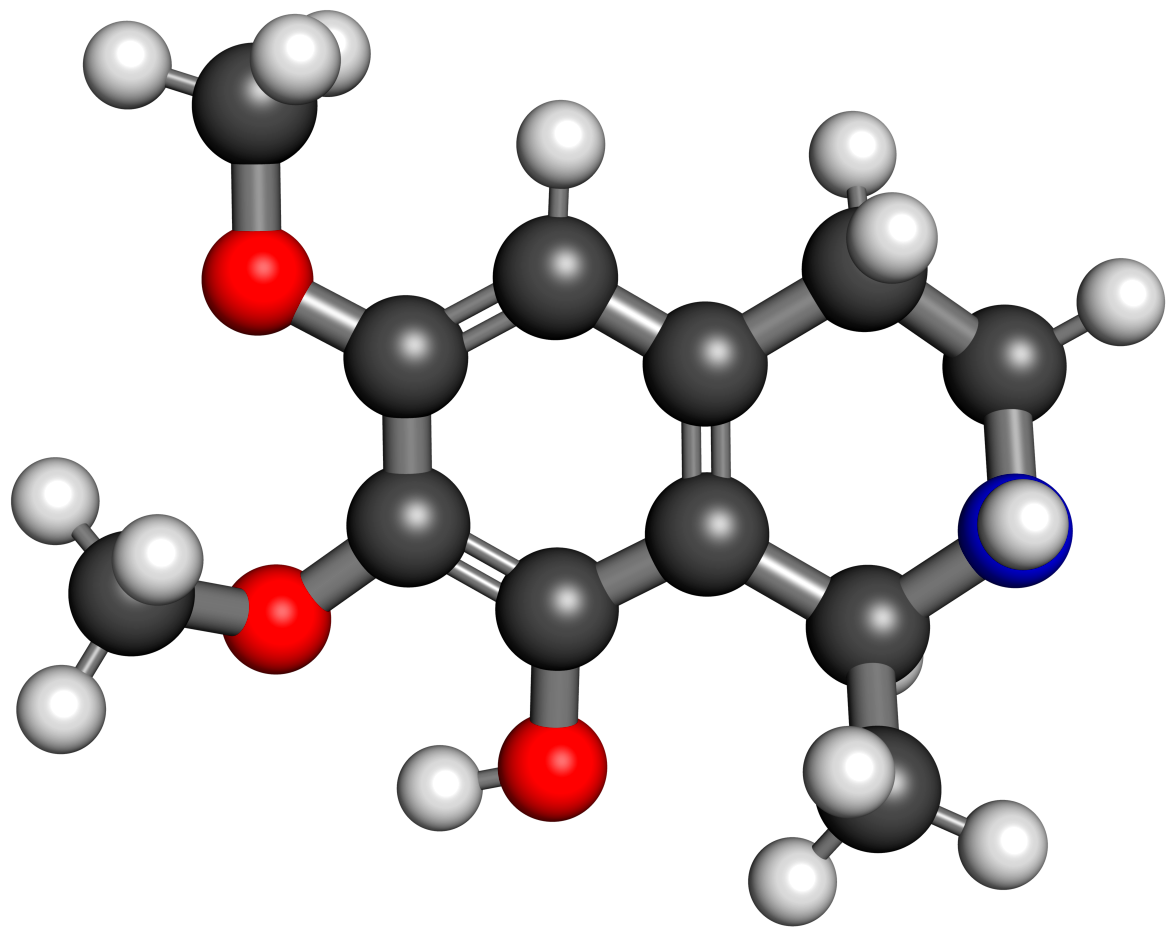

Clinical data
- Other names: N-Desmethylpellotine; 8-Hydroxy-6,7-dimethoxy-1-methyl-1,2,3,4-tetrahydroisoquinoline; 8-Hydroxy-6,7-dimethoxy-1-methyl-THIQ
- Drug class: Serotonin 5-HT_{7} receptor inverse agonist; Sedative; Hypnotic
- ATC code: None

Identifiers
- IUPAC name: (1S)-1,2,3,4-tetrahydro-6,7-dimethoxy-1-methyl-8-isoquinolinol
- CAS Number: 17627-77-9
- PubChem CID: 87201
- ChemSpider: 78662
- UNII: 23XP4B16AN
- KEGG: C16704
- CompTox Dashboard (EPA): DTXSID60876920

Chemical and physical data
- Formula: C_{12}H_{17}NO_{3}
- Molar mass: 223.272 g·mol^{−1}
- 3D model (JSmol): Interactive image
- Melting point: 160 °C (320 °F)
- SMILES: C[C@H]1c2c(cc(c(c2O)OC)OC)CCN1
- InChI: InChI=1S/C12H17NO3/c1-7-10-8(4-5-13-7)6-9(15-2)12(16-3)11(10)14/h6-7,13-14H,4-5H2,1-3H3/t7-/m0/s1; Key:PRNZAMQMBOFSJY-ZETCQYMHSA-N

Anhalonidine, also known as N-desmethylpellotine, a naturally occurring tetrahydroisoquinoline alkaloid which can be isolated from certain members of the cactus family, such as Lophophora, including notably Lophophora williamsii (peyote) (17% of alkaloid content). It is structurally related to mescaline. Anhalonidine produced no hallucinogenic effects in humans at doses of up to 250 mg. However, it has been reported to have a calming or sedative effect instead, with about one-fourth the potency of pellotine and with sedation or sleepiness occurring at doses of 100 to 250 mg. Anhalonidine has been found to act as a potent inverse agonist of the serotonin 5-HT_{7} receptor. Analogues of anhalonidine include anhalamine, anhalidine, anhalinine, gigantine, and pellotine, among others.

== See also ==
- Substituted tetrahydroisoquinoline
