= Anhalidine =

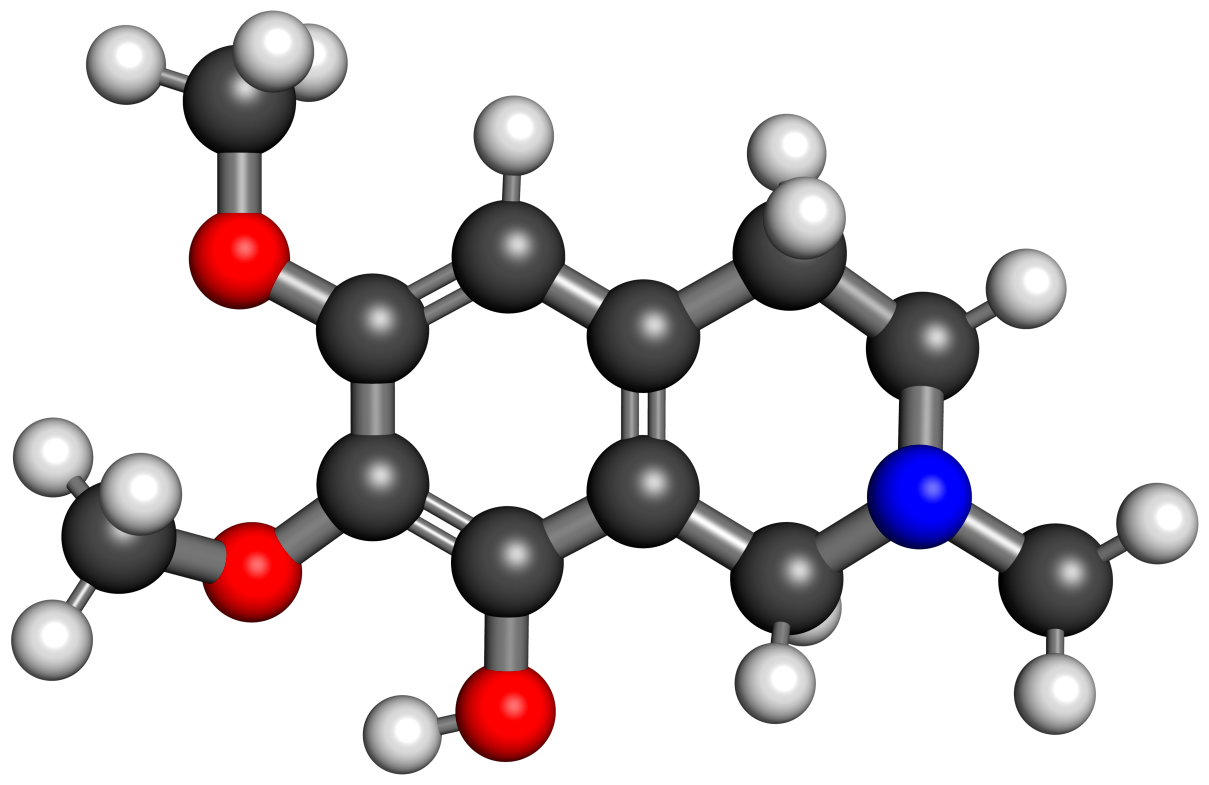

Clinical data
- Other names: N-Methylanhalamine; 8-Hydroxy-6,7-dimethoxy-2-methyl-1,2,3,4-tetrahydroisoquinoline; 8-Hydroxy-6,7-dimethoxy-2-methyl-THIQ
- Drug class: Serotonin 5-HT_{7} receptor inverse agonist
- ATC code: None

Identifiers
- IUPAC name: 6,7-dimethoxy-2-methyl-1,2,3,4-tetrahydroisoquinolin-8-ol
- CAS Number: 2245-94-5
- PubChem CID: 2752318
- ChemSpider: 2033430
- UNII: 4E6N7C369C
- CompTox Dashboard (EPA): DTXSID60176992

Chemical and physical data
- Formula: C_{12}H_{17}NO_{3}
- Molar mass: 223.272 g·mol^{−1}
- 3D model (JSmol): Interactive image
- SMILES: OC1=C(C(OC)=CC2=C1CN(C)CC2)OC
- InChI: InChI=1S/C12H17NO3/c1-13-5-4-8-6-10(15-2)12(16-3)11(14)9(8)7-13/h6,14H,4-5,7H2,1-3H3; Key:DTXOXOHMRGAFDX-UHFFFAOYSA-N

Anhalidine is a naturally occurring tetrahydroisoquinoline alkaloid found in Lophophora williamsii (peyote); it has also been detected in other cactii and several species of Acacia. It is part of a family of compounds that are structurally related to mescaline. Anhalidine has been found to act as a potent inverse agonist of the serotonin 5-HT_{7} receptor.

== See also ==
- Substituted tetrahydroisoquinoline
- Pellotine
