= Mescaline =

Naturally occurring psychedelic compound

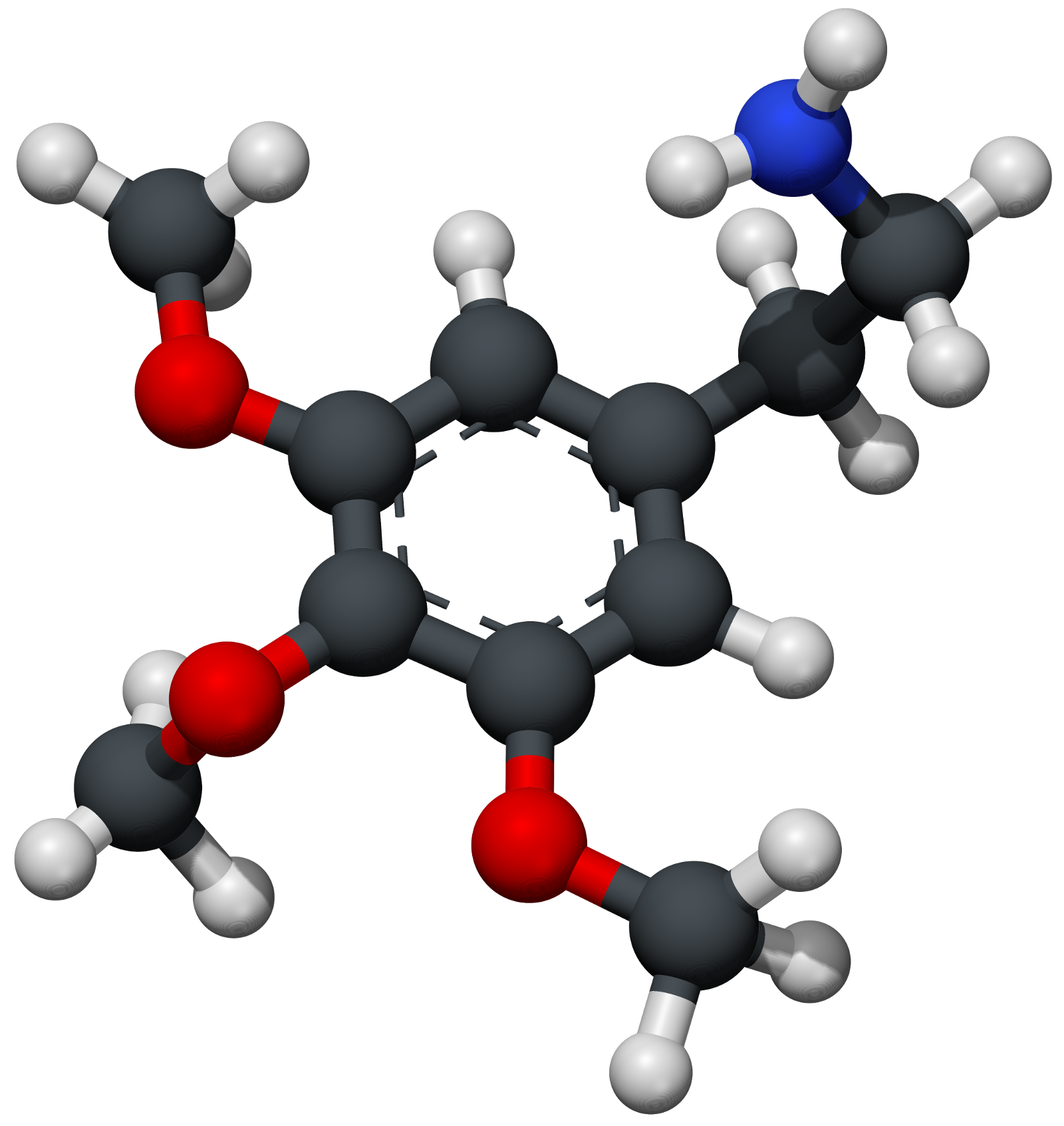

Clinical data
- Other names: M; Mescalin; Mezcalin; Mezcaline; Meskalin; Mezkalin; 3,4,5-Trimethoxyphenethylamine; 3,4,5-TMPEA; TMPEA; O,O-Dimethyl-5-methoxydopamine; 2C-TMA; EA-1306; NSC-30419; JOUR-5700; JOUR5700; BMND04; BMND06; BMND09
- AHFS/Drugs.com: mescaline
- Routes of administration: Oral, smoking, insufflation, intravenous
- Drug class: Serotonin receptor agonist; Serotonergic psychedelic; Hallucinogen
- ATC code: None

Legal status
- Legal status: AU: S9 (Prohibited substance); BR: Class F2 (Prohibited psychotropics); CA: Schedule III , except peyote; DE: Anlage I (Authorized scientific use only); UK: Class A (Plants containing mescaline legal); US: Schedule I (with religious use exceptions); UN: P I (psychoactive cactus like peyote or san pedro uncontrolled)

Pharmacokinetic data
- Bioavailability: Unknown (but ≥53%)
- Protein binding: Unknown (but appears minimal)
- Metabolism: Oxidative deamination, N-acetylation, O-demethylation, conjugation, other pathways
- Metabolites: • TMPA • TMPAA • TMPE • Others
- Onset of action: Oral: 0.5–0.9 hours (range 0.1–2.7 hours); IV: <10 minutes
- Elimination half-life: 3.6 hours (range 2.6–5.3 hours)
- Duration of action: Oral: 6.4–14 hours (range 3.0–22 hours); IV: ~4–9 hours
- Excretion: Urine (≥92%; 28–60% unchanged, ≥27–31% as TMPAA, 5% as N-Ac-3,4-DiMeO-5-OH-PEA, <0.1% as NAM)

Identifiers
- IUPAC name: 2-(3,4,5-trimethoxyphenyl)ethanamine
- CAS Number: 54-04-6
- PubChem CID: 4076
- DrugBank: DB19083
- ChemSpider: 3934
- UNII: RHO99102VC
- KEGG: C06546
- ChEBI: CHEBI:28346
- ChEMBL: ChEMBL26687
- PDB ligand: A1AFW (PDBe, RCSB PDB)
- CompTox Dashboard (EPA): DTXSID80202303
- ECHA InfoCard: 100.000.174

Chemical and physical data
- Formula: C_{11}H_{17}NO_{3}
- Molar mass: 211.261 g·mol^{−1}
- 3D model (JSmol): Interactive image
- Density: 1.067 g/cm^{3}
- Melting point: 35 to 36 °C (95 to 97 °F)
- Boiling point: 180 °C (356 °F) at 12 mmHg
- Solubility in water: moderately soluble in water mg/mL (20 °C)
- SMILES: O(c1cc(cc(OC)c1OC)CCN)C
- InChI: InChI=1S/C11H17NO3/c1-13-9-6-8(4-5-12)7-10(14-2)11(9)15-3/h6-7H,4-5,12H2,1-3H3; Key:RHCSKNNOAZULRK-UHFFFAOYSA-N

Mescaline, also known in chemical terms as 3,4,5-trimethoxyphenethylamine, is a naturally occurring psychedelic drug and alkaloid of the phenethylamine and scaline families found in certain cacti like peyote (Lophophora williamsii) and the San Pedro cactus (Echinopsis pachanoi, others).

The drug is used recreationally, spiritually, and medically, with psychedelic effects occurring at doses of 100 to 800 mg (as its hydrochloride salt) orally and it can be used in pure form or in the form of mescaline-containing cacti. Mescaline induces a psychedelic experience characterized by visual changes, altered perception of time, space, and self, synesthesia, and spiritual experiences, with an onset of 30 to 60 minutes, a time to peak of 2 to 4 hours, and a duration that increases with dose and ranges from 6 to 14 hours.

Mescaline primarily acts as a partial agonist at serotonin 5-HT_{2A} receptors, with varying affinity and efficacy across multiple other receptors and targets. The serotonin 5-HT_{2A} receptor antagonist ketanserin blocks mescaline's psychoactive effects. Mescaline is a relatively hydrophilic compound structurally related to dopamine, first synthesized in 1919, with numerous synthetic methods and potent analogues developed since. It occurs naturally in various cacti species, with concentrations varying widely, and is biosynthesized in plants from amino acids like phenylalanine and tyrosine.

The practice of humans consuming mescaline-containing cacti dates back over 6,000 years. Peyote cacti were studied scientifically in the 1800s, culminating in the isolation of mescaline as the active psychedelic constituent in cacti, legal recognition of religious use, and ongoing exploration of the therapeutic potential of mescaline and other analogues. Mescaline was the first psychedelic compound to be characterized by the Western world and has been referred to as the "first psychedelic".

Mescaline and the cacti that produce it are largely illegal worldwide, though exceptions exist for religious, scientific, or ornamental use, and the compound has influenced many notable cultural figures, for instance Aldous Huxley and Alexander Shulgin among others. Very few studies of mescaline in people have been conducted since the early 1970s. However, the drug is now being studied in terms of its effects and for potential medical use once again as of the early 2020s.

== Use and effects ==
Mescaline is used recreationally, spiritually, and medically. It is typically taken orally. The drug is used as a psychedelic at doses of 100 to 1,000 mg orally. Low doses are 100 to 200 mg, an intermediate or "good effect" dose is 500 mg, and a high (ego-dissolution) dose is 1,000 mg. However, doses of 800 mg and above orally are not well-tolerated due to side effects like severe nausea and vomiting. In his book PiHKAL (Phenethylamines I Have Known and Loved), Alexander Shulgin listed a dose range of 200 to 400 mg as the sulfate salt and 178 to 356 mg as the hydrochloride salt. Microdosing involves the use of daily mescaline doses of less than 75 mg. Mescaline has also been studied via intravenous injection, with assessed doses in the range of 500 to 750 mg as the sulfate salt. In addition to pure form, mescaline is used in the form of cacti such as peyote and the San Pedro cactus. Doses when mescaline is used in the form of fresh or dried cacti have also been described.

In traditional peyote preparations, the top of the cactus is cut off, leaving the large tap root along with a ring of green photosynthesizing area to grow new heads. These heads are then dried to make disc-shaped buttons. Buttons are chewed to produce the effects or soaked in water to drink. However, the taste of the cactus is bitter, so modern users will often grind it into a powder and pour it into capsules to avoid having to taste it. The average 76 mm (3.0 in) peyote button contains about 25 mg mescaline. However, another source states that there is about 45 mg mescaline per peyote button on average. Some analyses of traditional preparations of San Pedro cactus have found doses ranging from 34 mg to 159 mg of total alkaloids, a relatively low and barely psychoactive amount. It appears that patients who receive traditional treatments with San Pedro ingest sub-psychoactive doses and do not experience psychedelic effects.

The onset of the effects of mescaline given orally is 0.5 to 0.9 hours on average with a range of 0.1 to 2.7 hours. Its effects peak after 1.9 to 4.0 hours with a range of 0.5 to 8.0 hours. The duration of mescaline appears to be dose-dependent, varying from 6.4 hours on average (range 3.0–10 hours) at a dose of 100 mg, 9.7 to 11 hours on average (range 5.6–22 hours) at moderate doses of 300 to 500 mg, and 14 hours on average (range 7.2–22 hours) at a dose of 800 mg. Cases of mescaline having unusually prolonged or delayed effects have also been described. Given intravenously, mescaline has been reported to have an onset of several minutes or within 10 minutes, a time to peak of 1 to 2 hours, and a duration of approximately 4 to 9 hours in different studies.

Mescaline induces a psychedelic state comparable to those produced by LSD and psilocybin, but with unique characteristics. Subjective effects may include altered thinking processes, an altered sense of time and self-awareness, and closed- and open-eye visual phenomena. In PiHKAL, Shulgin described the effects of mescaline based on a collection of experience reports. The effects included brightened colors, increased visual contrast, open-eye visuals like colors and patterns, pareidolia, increased significance of objects, enhanced music appreciation, feeling intoxicated, self-analysis, insights, increased body awareness, feelings of joy, happiness, and peacefulness, feeling hyper and energized, feelings of empathy, things feeling ridiculous, humor and laughter, religious feelings, restlessness, social discomfort and avoidance, and nausea, among others. Mescaline was one of Shulgin's "magical half-dozen" psychedelic drugs in PiHKAL.

Prominence of color with mescaline is distinctive, appearing brilliant and intense. Recurring visual patterns observed during the mescaline experience include stripes, checkerboards, angular spikes, multicolor dots, and very simple fractals that can turn very complex. The English writer Aldous Huxley described these self-transforming amorphous shapes as like animated stained glass illuminated from light coming through the eyelids in his autobiographical book The Doors of Perception (1954). Like LSD, mescaline induces distortions of form and kaleidoscopic experiences but they manifest more clearly with eyes closed and under low lighting conditions. Heinrich Klüver coined the term "cobweb figure" in the 1920s to describe one of the four form constant geometric visual hallucinations experienced in the early stage of a mescaline trip: "Colored threads running together in a revolving center, the whole similar to a cobweb". The other three are the chessboard design, tunnel, and spiral. Klüver wrote that "many 'atypical' visions are upon close inspection nothing but variations of these form-constants." An unusual but unique characteristic of mescaline use is the "geometrization" of three-dimensional objects. The object can appear flattened and distorted, similar to the presentation of a Cubist painting. Detailed descriptions of the psychedelic experience induced by mescaline have been given by many authors.

The subjective effects of mescaline are qualitatively similar to those of LSD and psilocybin. Based on anecdotal evidence however, mescaline is said to be less threatening and to produce less ego dissolution than other psychedelics like LSD. This may in part be due its slow onset allowing for a more comfortable ease-in of effects. In addition, mescaline is typically dosed at lower doses than LSD or psilocybin in terms of doses with equivalent or comparable strength. According to a study in the Netherlands, ceremonial San Pedro use seems to be characterized by relatively strong spiritual experiences, and low incidence of challenging experiences. Mescaline, LSD, and psilocybin appear to produce similar color enhancement in clinical studies, though more research is needed.

== Contraindications ==
Contraindications of psychedelic drugs like mescaline include severe cardiovascular disease, epilepsy or seizures, schizophrenia and other psychotic disorders, bipolar disorder, and pregnancy, among others. Serotonin 5-HT_{2A} receptor antagonists such as atypical antipsychotics and certain antidepressants may block mescaline's hallucinogenic effects and hence may be considered contraindicated in this sense.

== Adverse effects ==
Side effects of mescaline include fatigue, weakness, impaired concentration, restlessness, tension, anxiety, panic, and social discomfort and avoidance, headache, pupil dilation, nausea, vomiting, sweating, trembling, discomfort, feeling hot or cold, palpitations, chest and neck pains, shortness of breath, increased heart rate and blood pressure, and increased body temperature, among others. Nausea and vomiting are important dose-limiting side effects of mescaline and occur at greater rates than with other psychedelics like LSD and psilocybin. High doses of mescaline, such as 800 mg and above, are not well-tolerated due to substantial nausea and vomiting. On the other hand, mescaline appears to induce less fear and anxiety than LSD and psilocybin even at equivalent doses.

=== Psychiatric adverse effects ===
==== Hallucinogen-induced psychotic disorder ====
Mescaline use may rarely lead to hallucinogen-induced psychotic disorder (HIPD). HIPD is a type of substance-induced psychosis. Hallucinogen-induced psychotic disorder symptoms are psychosis with paranoia, delusions, hallucinations, or disorganized thinking that persist beyond the effects of the drug. HIPD due to psychedelics is most commonly seen with LSD use, but may also be caused by mescaline. Hallucinogen-induced psychotic disorder is a medical emergency. Without treatment, the psychotic state can continue for weeks or months. HIPD is treated with an atypical antipsychotic medication such as aripiprazole, quetiapine, olanzapine, or risperidone. Individuals with a personal or family history of mental health issues are at the highest risk for hallucinogen-induced psychotic disorder. The condition occurs in fewer than 1% of people with psychedelics.

=== Tolerance ===
Mescaline is associated with rapid tolerance development, including cross-tolerance with other psychedelics like LSD and psilocybin. This tolerance is apparent within a few days and resets after 3 or 4 days of abstinence.

== Overdose ==
Only a single case of death due to mescaline, as peyote, has been described, and was likely due to asphyxiation by vomit rather than overdose or toxicity. However, there is also a case report of death due to jumping off a cliff while on a high dose of mescaline. In terms of extrapolated human lethal dose based on animal studies, the lethal dose of mescaline relative to a typical recreational dose has been estimated to be 24-fold or around 8,400 mg. However, mescaline has reportedly been taken by humans at doses of up to 8,000 mg without apparent toxic reactions. On the other hand, there is one unverified reported case of death due to a dose of 15,000 mg intravenously, which would equate to about 150 to 200 mg/kg. The median lethal dose (LD_{50}) of mescaline has been determined in various animal species, with the values including 212 to 315 mg/kg i.p. in mice, 132 to 410 mg/kg i.p. in rats, 328 mg/kg i.p. in guinea pigs, 54 mg/kg in dogs, and 130 mg/kg i.v. in rhesus macaques, among others. It has been said that it would be difficult to take enough mescaline to cause death in humans. No deaths due to peyote use have been reported aside from the asphyxiation case. The highest dose of peyote known to have been taken is 90 dried buttons.

== Interactions ==
=== Trip killers ===
Hallucinogen antidotes such as the atypical antipsychotics risperidone, quetiapine, and olanzapine are trip killers that are used to block the effects of mescaline and other hallucinogenic drugs. Atypical antipsychotics are serotonin 5-HT_{2A} receptor antagonists that directly block the effects of hallucinogens. The serotonin 5-HT_{2A} receptor antagonist ketanserin has been found to block the psychoactive effects of mescaline. Similarly, the antipsychotic chlorpromazine, which acts as both a dopamine D_{2} receptor antagonist and to a lesser extent as a serotonin 5-HT_{2A} receptor antagonist, has been reported to reverse the psychoactive effects of mescaline. Other phenothiazines, such as promethazine and diethazine, have also been reported to antagonize the effects of mescaline in humans, whereas prochlorperazine was much less effective and promazine was ineffective. Barbiturates, which are GABA_{A} receptor positive allosteric modulators, have been found to reduce the anxiety induced by mescaline.

=== Monoamine oxidase inhibitors ===
It is unclear whether mescaline is metabolized by monoamine oxidase (MAO) enzymes or whether monoamine oxidase inhibitors (MAOIs) might increase the effects of mescaline. No clinical studies of mescaline in combination with MAOIs are known to have been published. However, there are preliminary reports that harmala alkaloids, which are reversible inhibitors of monoamine oxidase A (RIMAs), may potentiate the effects of mescaline in humans, and the combination of mescaline or mescaline-containing cacti with harmala alkaloids has been referred to as "peyohuasca". In accordance with these findings, the harmala alkaloid and RIMA harmine has been reported to augment the effects of mescaline in animals. On the other hand, Daniel Trachsel has stated that mescaline is not metabolized by MAO, instead being metabolized by semicarbazide-sensitive amine oxidase (SSAO), and hence that MAOIs that do not also inhibit SSAO should have no effect on the metabolism of mescaline. Accordingly, the MAOI iproniazid did not potentiate the behavioral effects of mescaline in rats.

== Pharmacology ==
=== Pharmacodynamics ===
Mescaline activities
| Target | Affinity (K_{i}, nM) |
|---|---|
| 5-HT_{1A} | 1,841–4,600 |
| 5-HT_{1B} | >10,000 |
| 5-HT_{1D} | >10,000 |
| 5-HT_{1E} | 5,205 |
| 5-HT_{1F} | ND |
| 5-HT_{2A} | 550–17,400 (K_{i}); 88–30,200 (EC_{50}); 33–107% (E_{max}) |
| 5-HT_{2B} | 793–800 (K_{i}); 1,100–>20,000 (EC_{50}); 91% (E_{max}) |
| 5-HT_{2C} | 300–17,000 (K_{i}); 20–19,500 (EC_{50}); 22–109% (E_{max}) |
| 5-HT_{3} | >10,000 |
| 5-HT_{4} | ND |
| 5-HT_{5A} | >10,000 |
| 5-HT_{6} | >10,000 |
| 5-HT_{7} | >10,000 |
| α_{1A} | >15,000 |
| α_{1B} | >10,000 |
| α_{1D} | ND |
| α_{2A} | 1,400–8,930 |
| α_{2B} | >10,000 |
| α_{2C} | 745 |
| β_{1}–β_{2} | >10,000 |
| D_{1} | >10,000 |
| D_{2} | >10,000 |
| D_{3} | >17,000 |
| D_{4} | >10,000 |
| D_{5} | >10,000 |
| H_{1}–H_{4} | >10,000 |
| M_{1}–M_{5} | >10,000 |
| TAAR_{1} | 3,300 (K_{i}) (rat); 11,000 (K_{i}) (mouse); 3,700–4,800 (EC_{50}) (rodent) >10,000 (EC_{50}) (human) |
| I_{1} | 2,678 |
| σ_{1}–σ_{2} | >10,000 |
| SERT | >30,000 (K_{i}); 367,000 (IC_{50}) |
| NET | >30,000 (K_{i}) >900,000 (IC_{50}) |
| DAT | >30,000 (K_{i}); 841,000 (IC_{50}) |
Notes: The smaller the value, the more avidly the drug binds to the site. All proteins are human unless otherwise specified. Refs:

Mescaline acts as an agonist of the serotonin 5-HT_{2A} receptor to produce its psychedelic effects. Its EC_{50} at the serotonin 5-HT_{2A} receptor is approximately 10,000 nM and at the serotonin 5-HT_{2B} receptor is greater than 20,000 nM. How activating the 5-HT_{2A} receptor leads to psychedelic effects is still unknown, but it is likely that somehow it involves excitation of neurons in the prefrontal cortex. In addition to the serotonin 5-HT_{2A} and 5-HT_{2B} receptors, mescaline is also known to bind to the serotonin 5-HT_{2C} receptor and a number of other targets. The drug shows pronounced biased agonism at the serotonin 5-HT_{2C} receptor.

Mescaline lacks affinity for the monoamine transporters, including the serotonin transporter (SERT), norepinephrine transporter (NET), and dopamine transporter (DAT) (K_{i} > 30,000 nM). However, it has been found to increase levels of the major serotonin metabolite 5-hydroxyindoleacetic acid (5-HIAA) at high doses in rodents. This finding suggests that mescaline might inhibit the reuptake and/or induce the release of serotonin at such doses. In any case, this possibility has not yet been further assessed or demonstrated. Besides serotonin, mescaline might also weakly induce the release of dopamine, but this is probably of modest significance, if it occurs. In accordance, there is no evidence of the drug showing addiction or dependence. Mescaline appears to be inactive in terms of norepinephrine release induction and indirect sympathomimetic activity. Other psychedelic phenethylamines, including the closely related 2C, DOx, and TMA drugs, are inactive as monoamine releasing agents and reuptake inhibitors. However, an exception is trimethoxyamphetamine (TMA), the amphetamine analogue of mescaline, which is a very low-potency serotonin releasing agent (EC_{50} = 16,000 nM). The possible monoamine-releasing effects of mescaline would likely be related to the compound's phenethylamine backbone

Mescaline is a relatively low-potency psychedelic, with active doses in the hundreds of milligrams and micromolar affinities for the serotonin 5-HT_{2A} receptor. For comparison, psilocybin is approximately 25-fold more potent (doses in the tens of milligrams) and lysergic acid diethylamide (LSD) is approximately 5,000-fold more potent (doses in the tens to hundreds of micrograms). There have been efforts to develop more potent analogues of mescaline. Difluoromescaline and trifluoromescaline are more potent than mescaline, as is its amphetamine homologue TMA. Escaline and proscaline are also both more potent than mescaline, showing the importance of the 4-position substituent with regard to receptor binding.

Mescaline has been uniquely found to robustly produce aggression in rodents, an effect not shared by various other psychedelics. It is unclear why mescaline produces more nausea and vomiting than other psychedelics like LSD and psilocybin in humans. In any case, the serotonin 5-HT_{2A} receptor antagonist ketanserin blocked not only the psychoactive but also the physical side effects of mescaline including nausea and vomiting, suggesting that these effects may be mediated by serotonin 5-HT_{2A} receptor activation. Mescaline has been found to increase oxytocin levels in humans and to a greater extent than LSD or psilocybin at equivalent doses.

There is no evidence of acute tolerance with mescaline. However, tolerance to mescaline builds with repeated use, lasting for a few days. The drug causes cross-tolerance with other psychedelics like LSD and psilocybin.

The cryo-EM structures of the serotonin 5-HT_{2A} receptor with mescaline, as well as with various other psychedelics and serotonin 5-HT_{2A} receptor agonists, have been solved and published by Bryan L. Roth and colleagues.

Mescaline has been found to bind to tubulin and act as a highly potent mitotic inhibitor similarly to its cyclized derivatives colchicine and demecolcine. Aside from the identification of this action however, it does not appear to have been further studied.

=== Pharmacokinetics ===
==== Absorption ====
Mescaline is usually taken orally, although it may also be insufflated, smoked, or given intravenously. Taken orally, it is rapidly absorbed from the gastrointestinal tract. The oral bioavailability of mescaline is unknown. However, since at least 53% of orally administered mescaline is excreted in urine unchanged, the bioavailability appears to be at least 53%. Peak concentrations of mescaline occur after approximately 1.6 to 2.3 hours on average (range 1.0–6.0 hours). However, there is a delay of 1 to 2 hours following peak levels in terms of the drug producing maximal psychoactive and behavioral effects. The pharmacokinetics of mescaline are dose-proportional over an oral dose range of 100 to 800 mg.

==== Distribution ====
Mescaline is distributed to the liver, spleen, and kidneys at many times higher levels than blood or brain based on animal studies. It is said that a great proportion of mescaline is combined with hepatic proteins, which is said to delay its onset and elimination half-life. The exact portion bound to plasma proteins seems to be unknown, but appears to be minimal.

Mescaline appears to have relatively poor blood–brain barrier permeability due to its low lipophilicity. However, it is still able to cross into the central nervous system and produce psychoactive effects at sufficiently high doses. The poor central permeability of mescaline appears to be responsible for its delayed onset of effects and is also thought to contribute to its low potency.

==== Metabolism ====
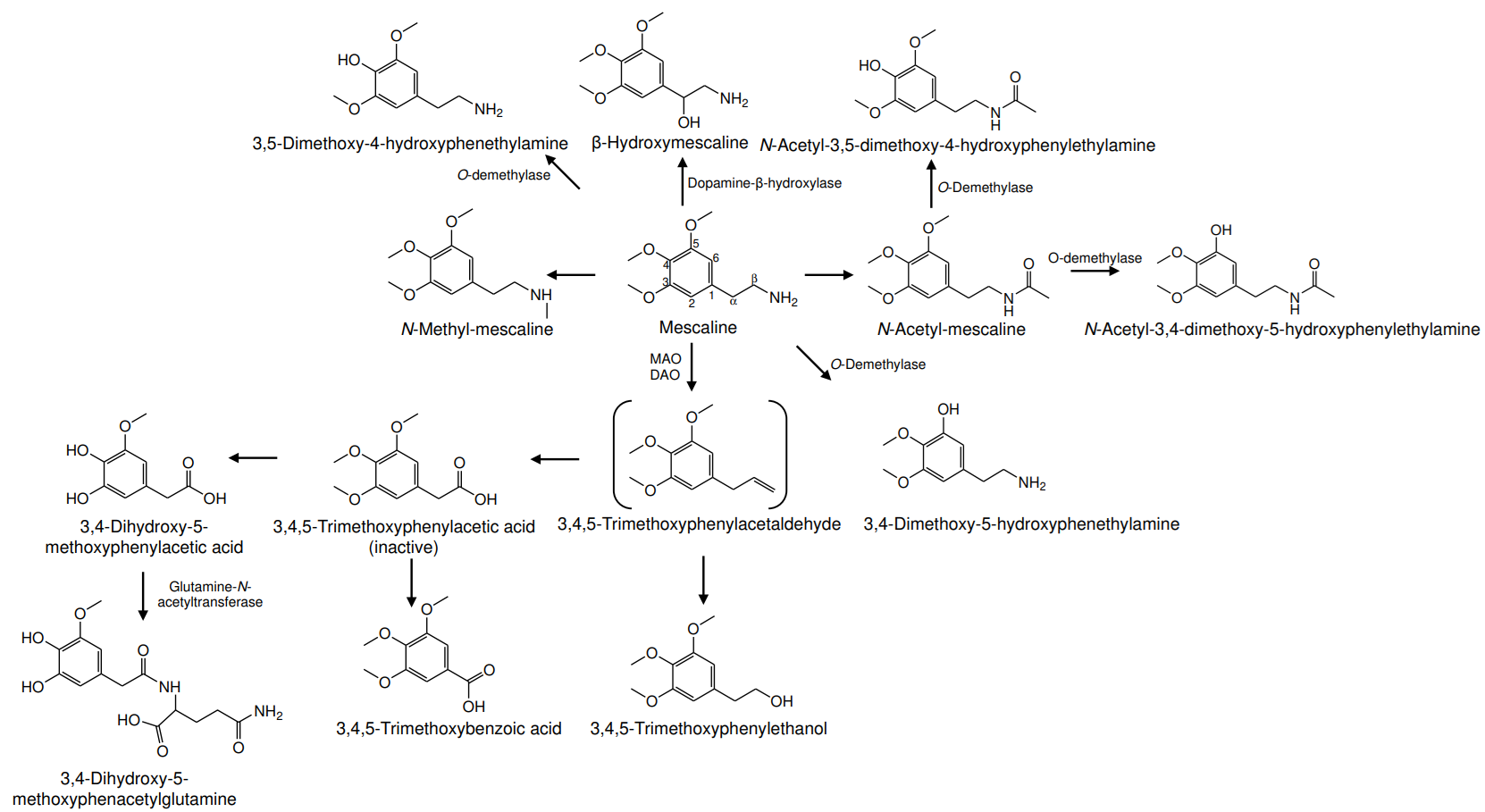
Metabolism of mescaline in humans and/or animals.

Mescaline given orally appears to be subject to first-pass metabolism of about 50%. Following the first pass, mescaline appears to be subject to relatively limited metabolism.

The primary metabolic pathway of mescaline is oxidative deamination. The specific enzymes mediating the deamination of mescaline are controversial however. Monoamine oxidase (MAO), diamine oxidase (DAO; histamine oxidase), semicarbazide-sensitive amine oxidase (SSAO), and/or other enzymes may be responsible. Preclinical studies of mescaline given in combination with inhibitors of MAO and/or DAO, such as iproniazid, pargyline, and semicarbazide, have been conducted, but findings have been conflicting. Mescaline has been reported to be a poor or negligible substrate of highly purified human MAO in-vitro. Mescaline is converted via deamination into 3,4,5-trimethoxyphenylacetaldehyde (TMPA) as an intermediate and then into 3,4,5-trimethoxyphenylacetic acid (TMPAA) or 3,4,5-trimethoxyphenylethanol (TMPE). β-Hydroxymescaline may also be a minor metabolite of mescaline formed by dopamine β-hydroxylase (DBH), though this remains unclear.

Mescaline appears not to be subject to metabolism by CYP2D6 based on in-vitro studies with human liver microsomes. Similarly, the in-vitro cytotoxicity of mescaline does not appear to be affected by cytochrome P450 (CYP450) enzyme inhibitors. Conversely, it was potentiated by the MAO-A inhibitor clorgiline but not by the MAO-B inhibitor rasagiline. These findings were in contrast to those with the related compound 2C-B, which was potentiated by rasagiline but not by clorgiline.

Circulating peak and area-under-the-curve concentrations of mescaline and TMPAA are similar with oral administration of mescaline. Conversely, levels of N-acetylmescaline (NAM) are far lower than those of mescaline or TMPAA and are thought not to be of clinical relevance. Intravenous injection of mescaline may result in less hepatic deamination than with oral administration.

It has been theorized that active metabolites of mescaline might contribute to its psychoactive effects. Relatedly, TMPA and TMPE were reported in early research to show pharmacological effects in rats and rabbits with greater potency than mescaline. In addition, co-administration of mescaline with the aldehyde dehydrogenase inhibitor (ALDHI) calcium carbimide, which elevates TMPA and/or TMPE levels, has been reported to produce extreme reactions in rabbits at doses at which mescaline alone was inactive. Similarly, co-administration of TMPE with calcium carbimide markedly potentiated the effects of TMPE. However, subsequent research found that TMPA, TMPE, and NAM all failed to produce mescaline-like effects in rodent drug discrimination tests, and this was the case even when they were co-administered with calcium carbimide. Likewise, another subsequent study found that TMPE and TMPAA were both inactive in producing behavioral effects in rodents, while TMPA was much less potent than mescaline. A further study found TMPAA to be inactive in animals as well. As with animal findings, both TMPAA and NAM have been said to be inactive based on human tests. It has also been noted that metabolites like TMPA and TMPE are rapidly metabolized. As such, metabolites of mescaline like TMPA, TMPE, TMPAA, and NAM do not appear to be involved in the drug's psychedelic-related effects.

3,4,5-Trimethoxyamphetamine (TMA), the α-methyl analogue of mescaline and an MAO-resistant psychedelic, is only about twice as potent as mescaline as a psychedelic in humans despite having similar serotonin receptor affinity. This suggests that the deamination of mescaline has a relatively limited impact on its potency, compared to for example the 2C series of psychedelics. Another analogue of mescaline, the deuterated isotopologue Alpha-D (α,α-dideuteromescaline), has been reported to be roughly one-third more potent than mescaline as a psychedelic in humans, albeit based on limited testing. This is consistent with findings of about one-third of a dose of mescaline being metabolized via deamination.

==== Elimination ====
Mescaline given orally is excreted 87% in urine within 24 hours and 92% in urine within 48 hours. During the first hour after administration, 81.4% of mescaline is excreted unchanged while 13.2% is excreted as its deaminated metabolite 3,4,5-trimethoxyphenylacetic acid (TMPAA). However, after the first hour, the percentage excreted as unchanged mescaline declines and the percentage excreted as TMPAA rises. Ultimately, mescaline is excreted in urine 28 to 60% unchanged, 27 to 30% or more as TMPAA, 5% as N-acetyl-3,4-dimethoxy-5-hydroxyphenylethylamine, and less than 0.1% as N-acetylmescaline. Other minor or trace excreted metabolites have also been observed. In a more modern study published in 2025, mescaline was eliminated in urine 53% as unchanged mescaline and 31% as TMPAA.

Mescaline was originally reported to have an elimination half-life of 6 hours based on a study conducted in the 1960s. However, subsequent research published in the 2020s found that its half-life is actually about 3.6 hours (range 2.6–5.3 hours). The previous higher estimate is believed to have been due to small sample numbers and collective measurement of mescaline metabolites. The elimination half-life of mescaline does not appear to be dose-dependent. TMPAA has a half-life of about 3.7 to 4.1 hours, similar to that of mescaline. Mescaline has a similar half-life as LSD yet has a longer duration. This is due to mescaline having slower absorption and onset rather than a longer half-life.

== Chemistry ==
Mescaline, also known as 3,4,5-trimethoxyphenethylamine (3,4,5-TMPEA), is a substituted phenethylamine derivative. It is closely structurally related to the dopamine (3,4-dihydroxyphenethylamine), norepinephrine (3,4,β-trihydroxyphenethylamine), and epinephrine (3,4,β-trihydroxy-N-methylphenethylamine). In contrast to the catecholamine neurotransmitters however, mescaline acts primarily on the serotonergic system rather than on the dopaminergic or adrenergic systems.

=== Properties ===
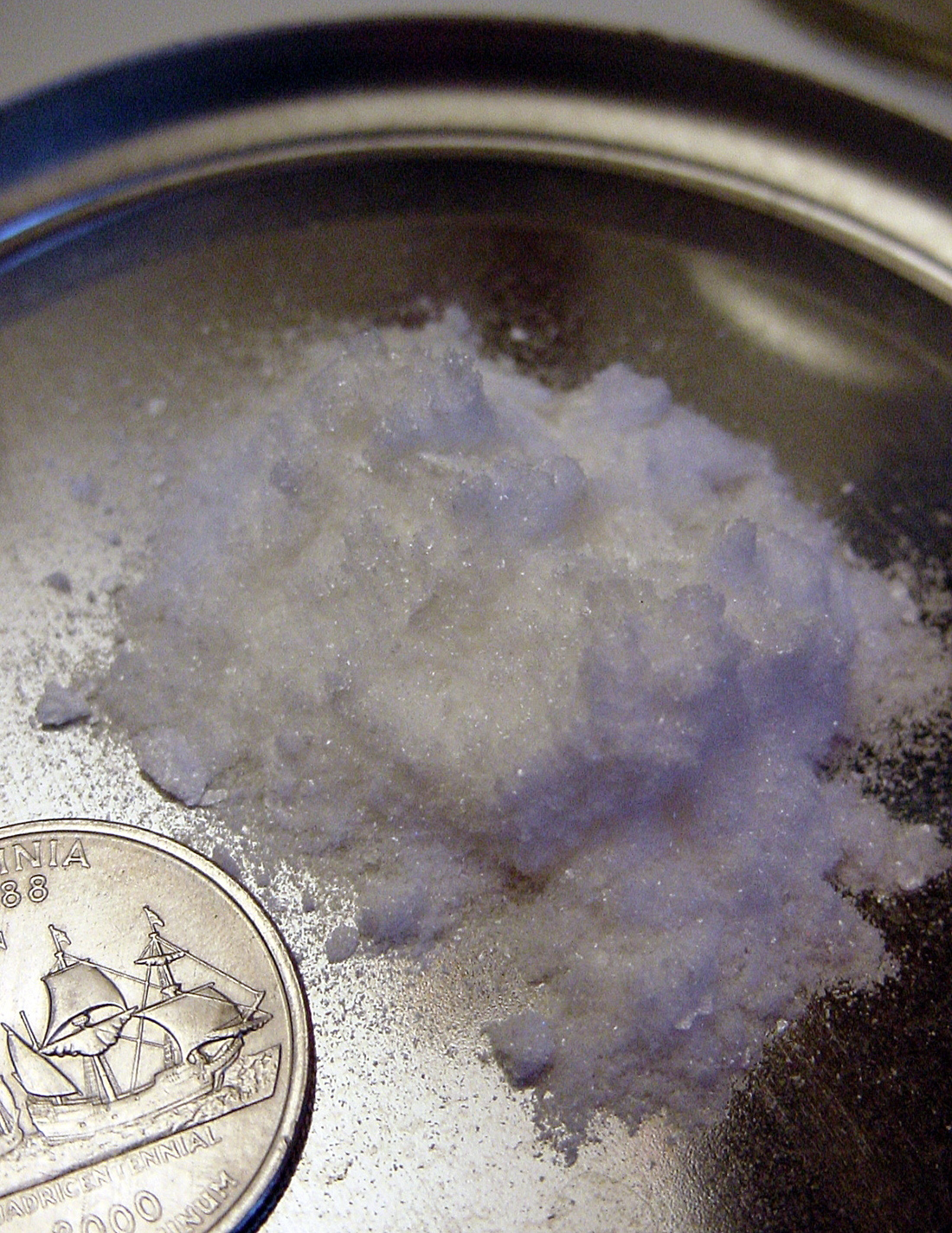
A sample of pure mescaline.

The physical properties and general chemistry of mescaline have been reviewed. The compound is relatively hydrophilic with low fat solubility. Its predicted log P (XLogP3) is 0.7.

=== Synthesis ===
Mescaline was the first ever psychedelic drug synthesized by chemists. Ernst Späth's 1919 total synthesis started from 3,4,5-trimethoxybenzoyl chloride. Several approaches using different starting materials have been developed since, including the following:

- Hofmann rearrangement of 3,4,5-trimethoxyphenylpropionamide.
- Cyanohydrin reaction between potassium cyanide and 3,4,5-trimethoxybenzaldehyde followed by acetylation and reduction.
- Henry reaction of 3,4,5-trimethoxybenzaldehyde with nitromethane followed by nitro compound reduction of ω-nitrotrimethoxystyrene. This was the method used by Alexander Shulgin in his 1991 book PiHKAL (Phenethylamines I Have Known and Loved).
- Ozonolysis of elemicin followed by reductive amination.
- Ester reduction of Eudesmic acid's methyl ester followed by halogenation, Kolbe nitrile synthesis, and nitrile reduction.
- Amide reduction of 3,4,5-trimethoxyphenylacetamide.
- Reduction of 3,4,5-trimethoxy(2-nitrovinyl)benzene with lithium aluminum hydride.
- Treatment of tricarbonyl-(η6-1,2,3-trimethoxybenzene) chromium complex with acetonitrile carbanion in THF and iodine, followed by reduction of the nitrile with lithium aluminum hydride.

=== Analogues ===
A large number of structural analogues of mescaline that act as psychedelics have been developed. These drugs often have far greater potency than mescaline itself. Examples include scalines like escaline, 3Cs like 3,4,5-trimethoxyamphetamine (TMA or TMA-1; α-methylmescaline), 2Cs like 2C-B, and DOx drugs like DOM, among others. Other notable analogues of mescaline include N-methylmescaline (found in Pachycereus pringlei), trichocereine (N,N-dimethylmescaline), mescaline-FLY, and NBOMe-mescaline, among others. Deuterated isotopologues of mescaline include α-D (α,α-dideuteromescaline), β-D (β,β-dideuteromescaline), α,β-D (α,β-dideuteromescaline), and 4-D (4-trideuteromescaline), among others.

== Natural occurrence ==
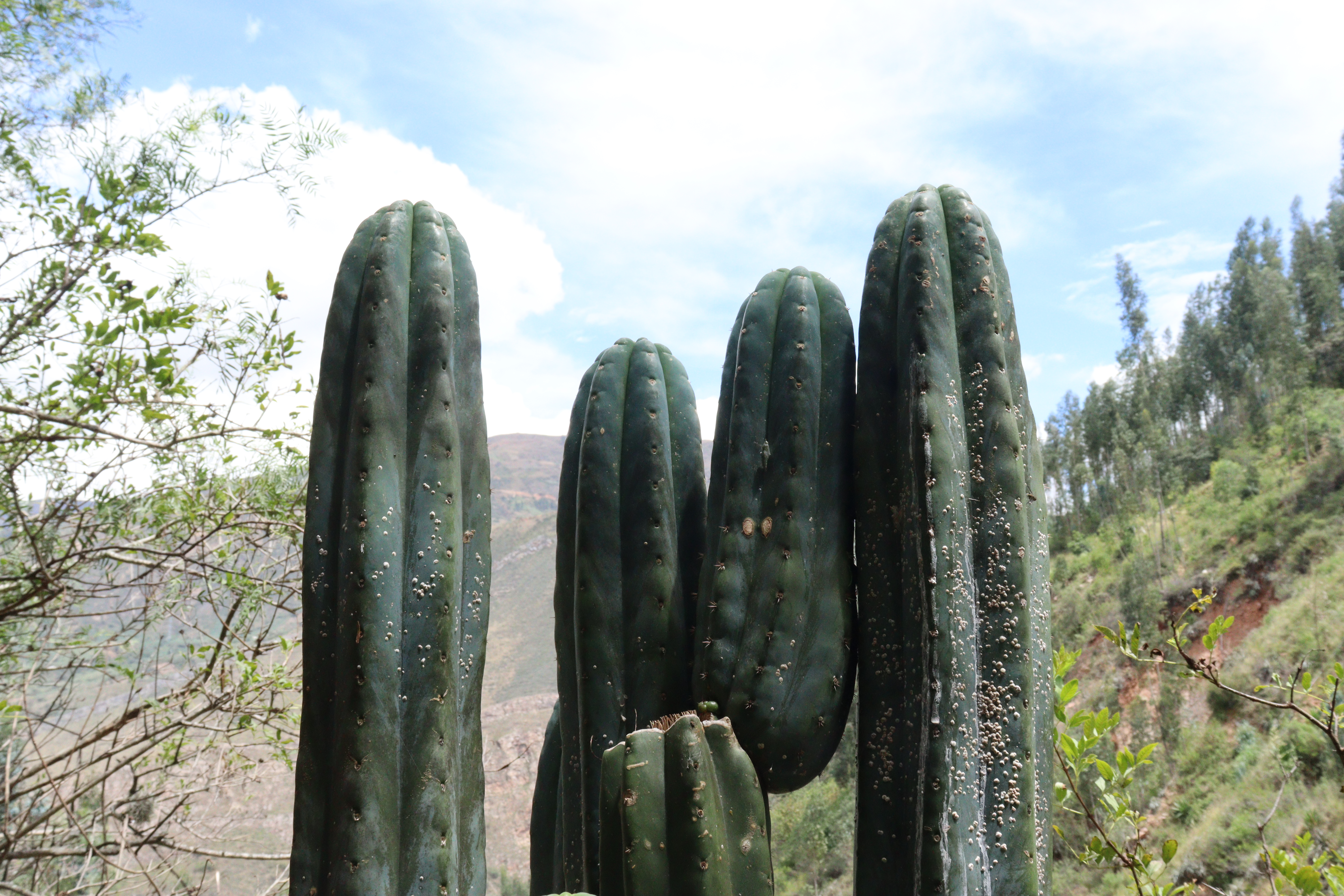
Trichocereus pachanoi (San Pedro cactus) in Peru.

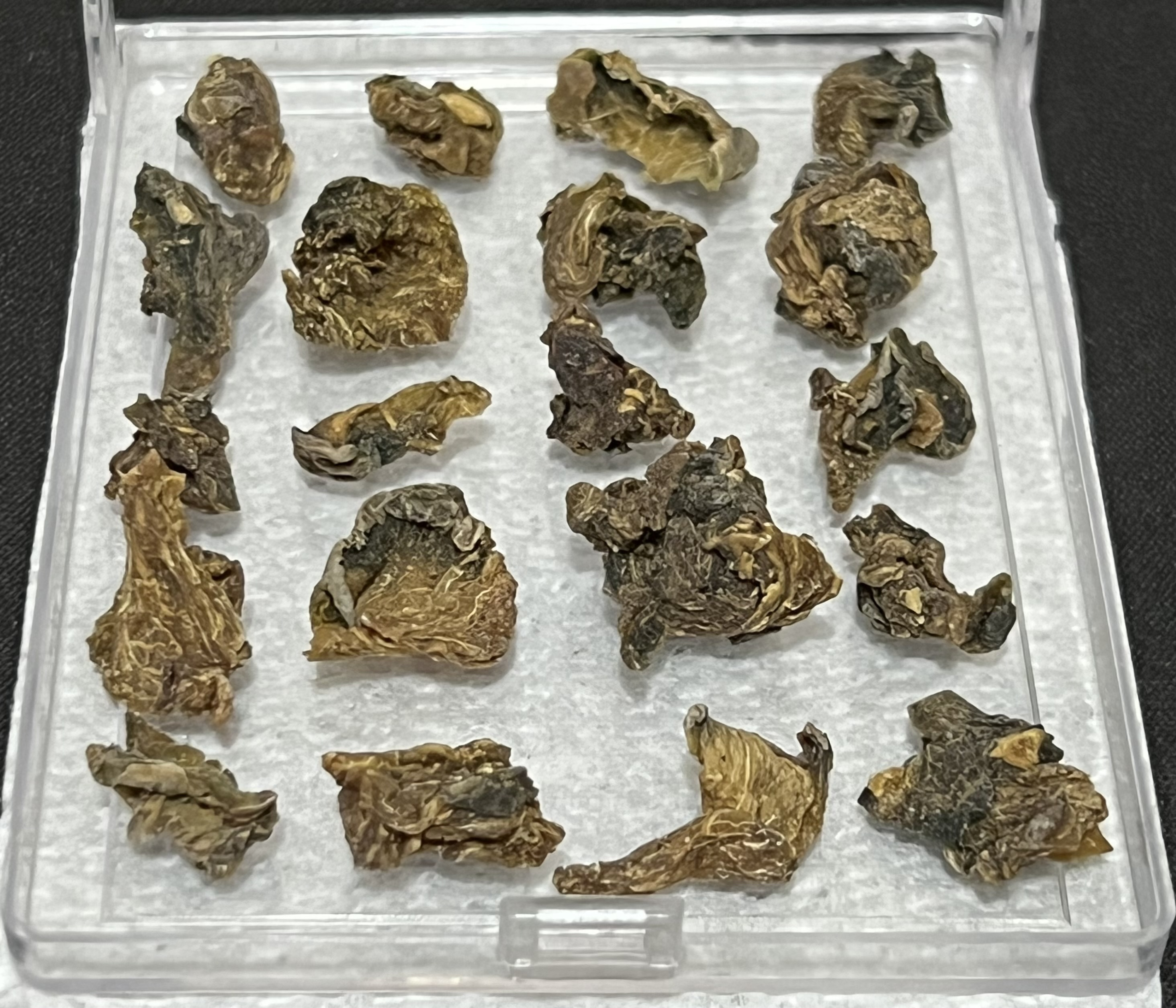
Dried peyote (Lophophora williamsii), containing ~5 to 6% mescaline by weight.

Mescaline has been isolated from numerous cactus species, including Echinopsis (Trichocereus), Gymnocalycium, Lophophora, Opuntia, Stenocereus, and Turbinicarpus species, among others. It occurs at the highest known concentrations in Lophophora williamsii (peyote), where it is highly variable but makes up 0.1 to 0.255% fresh weight and 0.9 to 6.3% of dry weight. Levels of mescaline are much lower in other Lophophora species. The compound also occurs in relatively high concentrations in various Echinopsis species, for instance Echinopsis pachanoi (San Pedro cactus), ranging from 0.02 to 0.12% fresh weight and 0.331 to 2.0% dry weight in this species. Mescaline occurs in only small or trace amounts in most other cactus species in which it has been detected.

Mescaline content in selected cactus species
| Plant source | Amount of mescaline (% of dry weight) |
|---|---|
| Echinopsis lageniformis (Bolivian torch cactus, syns. Echinopsis scopulicola, Trichocereus bridgesii) | Average 0.56%; 0.85% in one cultivar of Echinopsis scopulicola |
| Leucostele terscheckii (syns Echinopsis terscheckii, Trichocereus terscheckii) | 0.005–2.375% |
| Lophophora williamsii (peyote) | 0.01–5.5% |
| Trichocereus macrogonus var. macrogonus (Peruvian torch, syns Echinopsis peruviana, Trichocereus peruvianus) | 0.01–0.05%; 0.24–0.81% |
| Trichocereus macrogonus var. pachanoi (San Pedro cactus, syns Echinopsis pachanoi, Echinopsis santaensis, Trichocereus pachanoi) | 0.23–4.7%; 0.32% under its synonym Echinopsis santaensis |
| Trichocereus uyupampensis (syn. Echinopsis uyupampensis) | 0.05% |
| Trichocereus tacaquirensis (subsp. taquimbalensis syn. Trichocereus taquimbalensis) | 0.005–2.7% |

As shown in the accompanying table, the concentration of mescaline in different specimens can vary largely within a single species. Moreover, the concentration of mescaline within a single specimen varies as well.

In peyote, mescaline constitutes about 30% of total alkaloid content. For comparison, the alkaloid contents of other major constituents include pellotine 17%, anhalonidine 14%, anhalamine 8%, hordenine 8%, and lophophorine 5%.

It has also reported to be found in small amounts in certain members of the bean family, Fabaceae, including Senegalia berlandieri (syn. Acacia berlandieri), although these reports have been challenged and have been unsupported in any additional analyses.

In plants, mescaline may be the end-product of a pathway utilizing catecholamines as a method of stress response, similar to how animals may release such compounds and others such as cortisol when stressed. The in vivo function of catecholamines in plants has not been investigated, but they may function as antioxidants, as developmental signals, and as integral cell wall components that resist degradation from pathogens. The deactivation of catecholamines via methylation produces alkaloids such as mescaline.

=== Biosynthesis ===
Biosynthesis of mescaline.

Mescaline is biosynthesized from tyrosine, which, in turn, is derived from phenylalanine by the enzyme phenylalanine hydroxylase. In Lophophora williamsii (peyote), dopamine converts into mescaline in a biosynthetic pathway involving m-O-methylation and aromatic hydroxylation.

Tyrosine and phenylalanine serve as metabolic precursors towards the synthesis of mescaline. Tyrosine can either undergo a decarboxylation via tyrosine decarboxylase to generate tyramine and subsequently undergo an oxidation at carbon 3 by a monophenol hydroxylase or first be hydroxylated by tyrosine hydroxylase to form L-DOPA and decarboxylated by DOPA decarboxylase. These create dopamine, which then experiences methylation by a catechol-O-methyltransferase (COMT) by an S-adenosyl methionine (SAM)-dependent mechanism. The resulting intermediate is then oxidized again by a hydroxylase enzyme, likely monophenol hydroxylase again, at carbon 5, and methylated by COMT. The product, methylated at the two meta positions with respect to the alkyl substituent, experiences a final methylation at the 4 carbon by a guaiacol-O-methyltransferase, which also operates by a SAM-dependent mechanism. This final methylation step results in the production of mescaline.

Phenylalanine serves as a precursor by first being converted to L-tyrosine by L-amino acid hydroxylase. Once converted, it follows the same pathway as described above.

== History ==
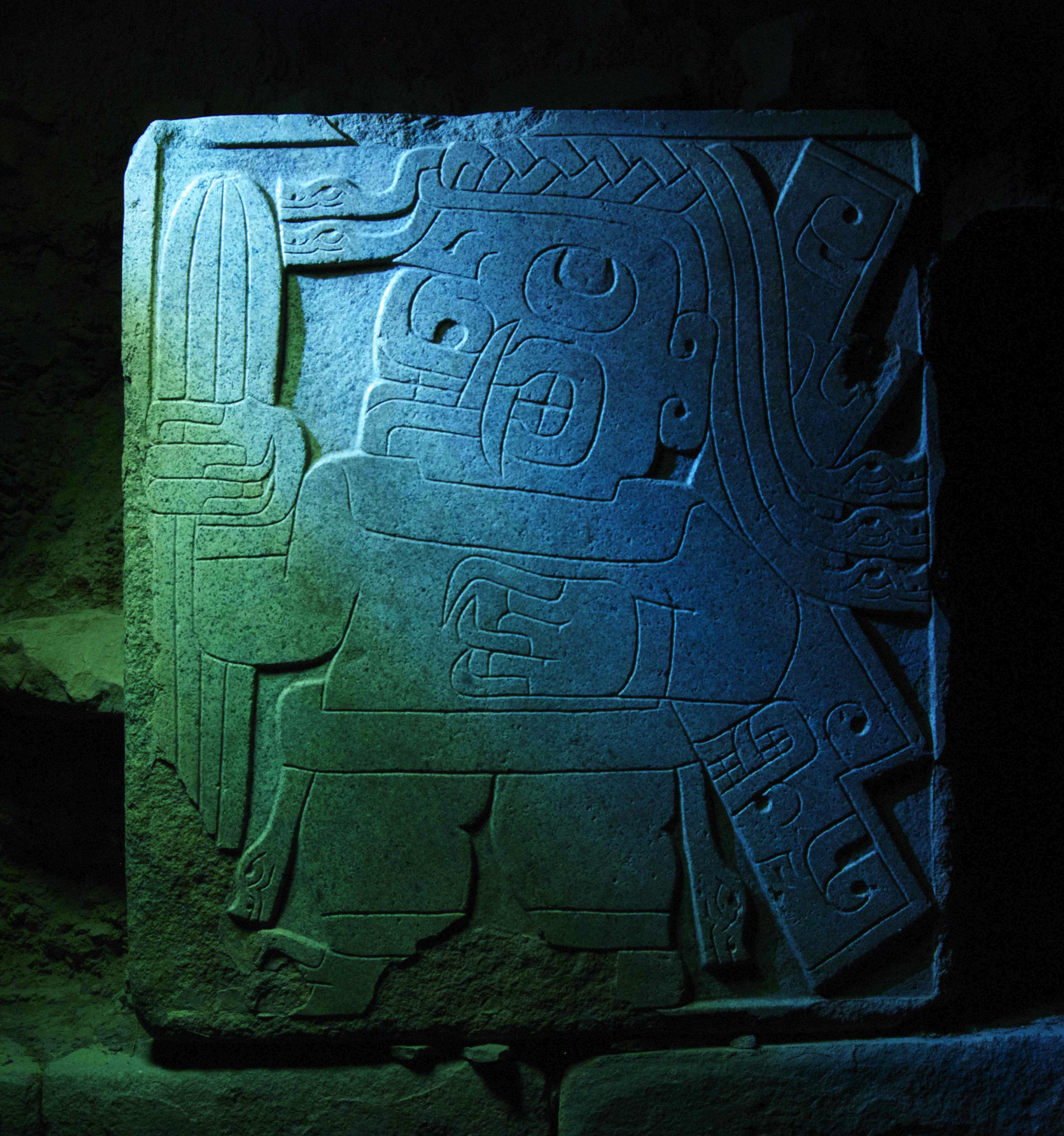
The stela of the cactus bearer, a piece of ancient Peruvian art depicting the San Pedro cactus.

Archaeological evidence from sites in the United States, Mexico, and Peru indicates that mescaline-containing cacti have been used for over 6,000 years. Europeans recorded use of peyote in Native American religious ceremonies upon early contact with the Huichol people in Mexico. Other mescaline-containing cacti such as the San Pedro cactus have a long history of use in South America, from Peru to Ecuador. While religious and ceremonial peyote use was widespread in the Aztec Empire and northern Mexico at the time of the Spanish conquest, religious persecution confined it to areas near the Pacific coast and up to southwest Texas. However, by 1880, peyote use began to spread north of South-Central America with "a new kind of peyote ceremony" inaugurated by the Kiowa and Comanche people. These religious practices, incorporated legally in the United States in 1920 as the Native American Church, have since spread as far as Saskatchewan, Canada.

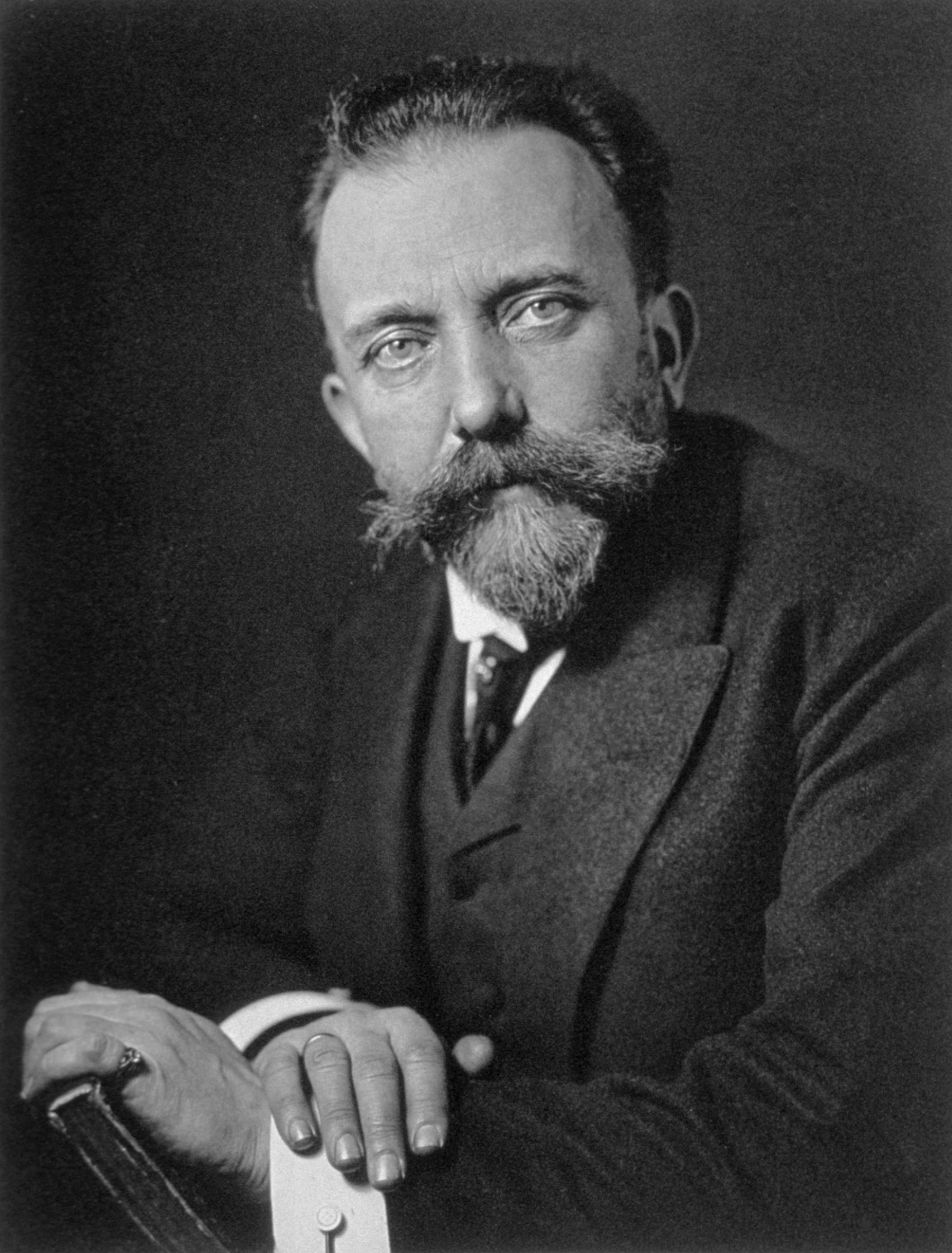
Arthur Heffter, the chemist who isolated mescaline and discovered its effects.

Peyote was first described by Bernardino de Sahagún in 1560. It was first scientifically named as Peyotl zacatensis by Francisco Hernández in 1638. Botanical studies of peyote began in the 1840s and the drug was listed in the Mexican pharmacopeia. The first use of mescal buttons was published by John Raleigh Briggs in 1887. However, he took a very low dose of the drug, and in the modern literature, the symptoms he experienced have been attributed to a severe panic attack in response to the drug. In 1887, the German pharmacologist Louis Lewin received his first sample of the peyote cactus, found numerous new alkaloids and later published the first methodical analysis of it. The effects of mescaline in humans were first properly described by D. W. Prentiss and Francis P. Morgan in 1895. Mescaline was first isolated and identified in 1897 by the German chemist Arthur Heffter. He showed that mescaline was exclusively responsible for the psychoactive or hallucinogenic effects of peyote. However, other components of peyote, such as hordenine, pellotine, and anhalinine, are also active. Mescaline was first synthesized in 1919 by Ernst Späth.

Three major books on mescaline and/or peyote were published in the mid-to-late 1920s. These included French pharmacist Alexandre Rouhier's Le Peyotl: La Plante Qui Fait les Yeux Émerveillés (Peyote: The Plant That Fills the Eyes with Marvels) in 1927, the German psychiatrist Kurt Beringer's Der Meskalinrausch, seine Geschichte und Erscheinungsweise (Mescaline Intoxication, its History and Manifestation) in 1927, and German–American psychologist Heinrich Klüver's Mescal: The Divine Plant and Its Psychological Effects in 1928.

Studies of the potential therapeutic effects of mescaline started in the 1950s. It was studied as part of psychedelic-assisted psychotherapy by Walter Frederking by 1953. Aldous Huxley's book The Doors of Perception, about his experience with mescaline, was published in 1954. In 1955, English politician Christopher Mayhew took part in an experiment for BBC's Panorama, in which he ingested 400 mg of mescaline under the supervision of psychiatrist Humphry Osmond. Though the recording was deemed too controversial and ultimately omitted from the show, Mayhew praised the experience, calling it "the most interesting thing I ever did" and saying that it was "profoundly thought-provoking".

The mechanism of action of mescaline, activation of the serotonin 5-HT_{2A} receptors, became fully known in the 1990s. A serotonin 5-HT_{2A} receptor antagonist, specifically ketanserin, was first clearly shown to block the psychedelic effects of mescaline in humans by Matthias Liechti and colleagues in 2024.

The history of mescaline was reviewed in the 2019 book Mescaline: A Global History of the First Psychedelic by cultural historian Mike Jay.

== Society and culture ==
=== Religious use ===
Mescaline-containing cacti are used as entheogens for religious purposes by certain Latin American and Native American and groups. The Huichol (Wixárika) people of Mexico and the Native American Church use peyote, while the native people of Peru use the San Pedro cactus (huachuma). The use of mescaline-containing cacti for such purposes by Mexican and South American people dates back thousands of years. The use of peyote spread from the Huichol people into Native American tribes such as the Kiowa and Comanche in the late 1800s.

=== Notable individuals ===
- Arthur Heffter isolated mescaline from peyote and discovered its psychedelic effects via self-experimentation. He published these findings in 1898. Heffter was the first person to experience psychedelic effects with a pure psychedelic compound.
- Silas Weir Mitchell was one of the first to experiment with mescaline, as peyote, and published his experience in 1896.
- Havelock Ellis was the author of one of the first written reports to the public about an experience with mescaline (1898).
- William James was one of the first to experiment with mescaline, as peyote. However, he took a low dose (1 peyote button), became violently ill for 2 days, and experienced no other effects. He opted not to retry the drug. James tried peyote in 1896 but his experience was not published until decades later.
- Jean-Paul Sartre took mescaline shortly before the publication of his book, L'Imaginaire (1940); he had a bad trip during which he imagined that he was menaced by sea creatures. For many years following this, he persistently imagined that he was being followed by lobster- or crab-like creatures, and became a patient of Jacques Lacan in hopes of being rid of them. Lobsters and crabs figure in his novel Nausea (1938).
- Salvador Dalí has been persistently rumored to have taken psychedelics such as mescaline. However, in response to these rumors, Dalí famously exclaimed "I don't do drugs. I am drugs!" in 1982.
- Antonin Artaud wrote 1947's The Peyote Dance, where he describes his peyote experiences in Mexico a decade earlier.
- Allen Ginsberg took peyote. Part II of his poem "Howl" was inspired by a peyote vision that he had in San Francisco.
- Aldous Huxley described his experience with mescaline in the essay "The Doors of Perception" (1954).
- Ken Kesey took peyote prior to writing One Flew Over the Cuckoo's Nest.
- Stanisław Ignacy Witkiewicz, Polish writer, artist and philosopher, experimented with mescaline and described his experience in a 1932 book Nikotyna Alkohol Kokaina Peyotl Morfina Eter.
- Jim Carroll in The Basketball Diaries described using peyote that a friend smuggled from Mexico.
- Quanah Parker, appointed by the federal government as principal chief of the entire Comanche Nation, advocated the syncretic Native American Church alternative, and fought for the legal use of peyote in the movement's religious practices.
- Hunter S. Thompson wrote an extremely detailed account of his first use of mescaline in "First Visit with Mescalito", and it appeared in his book Songs of the Doomed, as well as featuring heavily in his novel Fear and Loathing in Las Vegas.
- Alexander Shulgin, the prolific psychedelic chemist, said that he was first inspired to explore psychedelic compounds by a mescaline experience in 1960. In 1974, Shulgin synthesized 2C-B, a psychedelic phenylethylamine derivative, structurally similar to mescaline, and one of Shulgin's self-rated most important phenethylamine compounds together with mescaline, 2C-E, 2C-T-7, and 2C-T-2.
- Bryan Wynter produced Mars Ascends after trying the substance for the first time.
- George Carlin mentioned mescaline use during his youth while being interviewed in 2008.
- Carlos Santana told about his mescaline use in a 1989 Rolling Stone interview.
- Disney animator Ward Kimball described participating in a study of mescaline and peyote conducted by UCLA in the 1960s.
- Michael Cera used real mescaline for the movie Crystal Fairy & the Magical Cactus, as expressed in an interview.
- Philip K. Dick was inspired to write Flow My Tears, the Policeman Said after taking mescaline.
- Arthur Kleps, a psychologist turned drug legalization advocate and writer whose Neo-American Church defended use of marijuana and hallucinogens such as LSD and peyote for spiritual enlightenment and exploration, bought, in 1960, by mail from Delta Chemical Company in New York 1 g of mescaline sulfate and took 500 mg. He experienced a psychedelic trip that caused profound changes in his life and outlook.
- Michael Pollan has described his experiences with mescaline and San Pedro cactus.

=== Media representations ===
==== Movies ====
- Fantasia (1940), with lead visualist Oskar Fischinger, may have been inspired by mescaline-induced visuals.
- Fear and Loathing in Las Vegas (1998) starring Johnny Depp and Benicio del Toro featured mescaline use.
- The Matrix (1999) by the Wachowskis included a brief mention of mescaline.
- The Royal Tenenbaums (2001) features a character named Eli Cash (Owen Wilson) who regularly takes mescaline.
- Crystal Fairy & the Magical Cactus (2013) starring Michael Cera and Gaby Hoffmann was about taking mescaline in the form of the San Pedro cactus.

==== Documentaries ====
- Peyote to LSD: A Psychedelic Odyssey (2008), a History Channel documentary, covers mescaline.
- Hamilton's Pharmacopeia (2016–2021) has multiple episodes on mescaline in the form of peyote and the San Pedro cactus.
- How to Change Your Mind (2022) features an episode on mescaline.

=== Legal status ===
==== United States ====
In the United States, mescaline was made illegal in 1970 by the Comprehensive Drug Abuse Prevention and Control Act, categorized as a Schedule I hallucinogen. The drug is prohibited internationally by the 1971 Convention on Psychotropic Substances. Mescaline is legal only for certain religious groups (such as the Native American Church by the American Indian Religious Freedom Act of 1978) and in scientific and medical research. In 1990, the Supreme Court ruled that the state of Oregon could ban the use of mescaline in Native American religious ceremonies. The Religious Freedom Restoration Act (RFRA) in 1993 allowed the use of peyote in religious ceremony, but in 1997, the Supreme Court ruled that the RFRA is unconstitutional when applied against states. Many states, including the state of Utah, have legalized peyote usage with "sincere religious intent", or within a religious organization, regardless of race. Synthetic mescaline, but not mescaline derived from cacti, was officially decriminalized in the state of Colorado by ballot measure Proposition 122 in November 2022.

While mescaline-containing cacti of the genus Echinopsis are technically controlled substances under the Controlled Substances Act, they are commonly sold publicly as ornamental plants.

==== United Kingdom ====
In the United Kingdom, mescaline in purified powder form is a Class A drug. However, dried cactus can be bought and sold legally.

==== Australia ====
Mescaline is considered a schedule 9 substance in Australia under the Poisons Standard (February 2020). A schedule 9 substance is classified as "Substances with a high potential for causing harm at low exposure and which require special precautions during manufacture, handling or use. These poisons should be available only to specialised or authorised users who have the skills necessary to handle them safely. Special regulations restricting their availability, possession, storage or use may apply."

==== Other countries ====
In Canada, France, the Netherlands, and Germany, mescaline in raw form and dried mescaline-containing cacti are considered illegal drugs. However, anyone may grow and use peyote (Lophophora williamsii) as well as Echinopsis pachanoi and Echinopsis peruviana (San Pedro cactus) without restriction, as they are specifically exempt from legislation. In Canada, mescaline is classified as a schedule III drug under the Controlled Drugs and Substances Act, whereas peyote is exempt. In Russia, mescaline, its derivatives, and mescaline-containing plants are banned as narcotic drugs (Schedule I).

== Research ==
Mescaline has a wide array of suggested medical usage, including treatment of depression, anxiety, PTSD, nicotine dependence, and alcoholism. However, its status as a Schedule I controlled substance in the Convention on Psychotropic Substances limits availability of the drug to researchers. Because of this, very few studies concerning mescaline's activity and potential therapeutic effects in people have been conducted since the early 1970s. However, the drug is under development by Journey Colab under the code name JOUR-5700 and by Biomind Labs under the code names BMND04, BMND06, and BMND09 for various medical applications, such as treatment of alcoholism.

== See also ==
- Scaline
