= Mescaline: A Global History of the First Psychedelic =

2019 book by Mike Jay

- Author: Mike Jay
- Language: English
- Subject: History of mescaline
- Genre: Non-fiction
- Publisher: Yale University Press
- Publication date: 2019
- Publication place: New Haven, Connecticut
- Pages: 304
- ISBN: 978-0-3002-3107-6
- OCLC: 1055264022
- Website: mikejay.net/books/mescaline/

Mescaline: A Global History of the First Psychedelic is a 2019 book by Mike Jay about the history of the psychedelic drug mescaline. This drug is found in certain cacti such as peyote and the San Pedro cactus and was the first psychedelic to be characterized and used by the Western world. The book includes both the indigenous and Western history of the drug. Interviews with Jay about the book has been published. In addition, many reviews of the book have been published.

== See also ==
- List of psychedelic literature
