= Ocucaje desert =

Desert in Peru

Coordinates: 14°27′S 75°45′W

The Ocucaje Desert is a desert located in the Ica Province of the Ica Region in southern Peru between the Andes Mountains and the Pacific Ocean. It is part of the larger coastal desert of Peru, characterized by its dry, sandy landscape and significant archeological and paleontological importance.

== Geography and climate ==
The Ocucaje Desert spans a southern portion of the Peruvian coastal desert, which stretches along the Pacific Ocean. The region is characterized by its hyper-arid climate, with extremely low precipitation, high temperatures, and strong winds. These conditions contribute to the preservation of ancient fossils and archaeological sites.

== Flora and fauna ==
=== Flora ===
The vegetation in the Ocucaje Desert is sparse but resilient. The flora primarily includes xerophytic (drought-resistant) plants such as cacti, succulents, and hardy shrubs. Common species include the Peruvian torch cactus (Echinopsis peruviana) and the chia (Salvia hispanica). These plants have adapted to the extreme dryness through various means such as water storage in thick stems, deep root systems, and reduced leaf surface area to minimize water loss.

=== Fauna ===
The desert's fauna is equally adapted to its challenging environment. Reptiles, such as the coastal desert iguana (Dipsosaurus dorsalis) and various lizard species, are common. Mammals, including the desert fox (Pseudalopex culpaeus) and a variety of rodent species, have also adapted to the arid conditions. Bird species such as the burrowing owl (Athene cunicularia) and various raptors can be seen soaring over the desert. Insects and arachnids, including scorpions and beetles, play crucial roles in the ecosystem.

== Paleontological significance ==
The Ocucaje Desert is the source of a variety of prehistoric marine fossil discoveries. The region is known for the rarity of its fossils with many discoveries being of "species seen nowhere else". As of 2023, 55 new prehistoric marine species have been discovered including Perucetus colossus, a manatee-like whale now considered the heaviest animal known to have existed.

In 2013, researchers unearthed a 90 percent complete fossil of a 40 million year old whale from the Archaeoceti group in the Ocucaje Desert. The whale's remains are the oldest ever found in South America. The fossil was coined the "walking whale" as the species of whale had yet to lose its hind legs. This became a notable find in the field of paleontology due to the lack of primitive whale fossils and the skeleton being almost entirely intact. The discovery provided important new insights about the evolutionary transition of whales from a terrestrial to an aquatic environment.

== Archaeological importance ==
The Ocucaje Desert is also notable for its archaeological sites, particularly those associated with the Paracas and Nazca cultures. The Paracas civilization was a pre-Columbian society which thrived in the region from around 800 BCE to 100 BCE. The desert's dry conditions have preserved Paracas textiles, pottery, and other artifacts. The Nazca Culture, known for the famous Nazca Lines, existed from around 100 BCE to 800 CE in the desert. While the lines themselves are located closer to the city of Nazca, the influence of this culture extends into the Ocucaje Desert, where additional geoglyphs and settlements have been found. These discoveries provide a glimpse into the lives of the ancient peoples who once thrived in this harsh desert environment

The Ocucaje Desert has also gained attention for the enigmatic Ica Stones, a collection of andesite stones which appear to bear carvings of dinosaurs, humans, and advanced technology. These stones were brought to public attention in the 1960s by Dr. Javier Cabrera Darquea, who believed they depicted evidence of a pre-Columbian civilization with advanced knowledge. However, the authenticity of the Ica Stones has been a subject of intense debate, with many scholars considering them modern hoaxes.

== Tourism ==
The desert houses many natural attractions such as the Canyon of the Lost, a picturesque canyon that presents an array of rock formations, steep cliffs, and winding pathways carved over millennia by natural forces. Its name derives from the labyrinthine nature of its trails, which can be disorienting to navigate. The canyon's walls, composed of sedimentary rock, reveal layers of earth's history and contain fossils that date back millions of years, offering valuable insights to geologists and paleontologists. Visitors to the Canyon of the Lost can explore its depths through guided tours, which often highlight the area's flora and fauna, as well as its significant archaeological and paleontological sites.

A significant cultural attraction in the Ocucaje Desert is the Museum of Engraved Stones, founded by Dr. Javier Cabrera Darquea. The museum houses the controversial collection of engraved stones that depict various scenes, including prehistoric animals and advanced technologies, which some believe suggest an unknown ancient civilization.

== Threats ==
The Ocucaje Desert faces threats from unplanned development and rapid, informal urban growth. National real estate companies are continuing to advertise the building of "suburban-style homes in the desert of Ocucaje". Due to cultural and paleontological significance of this region, many have advocated for the creation of a national park in the Ocucaje Desert.
