= San Pedro cactus =

San Pedro cactus may refer to several species of cactus potentially containing mescaline, particularly:

- Echinopsis pachanoi (Trichocereus pachanoi, Trichocereus macrogonus var. pachanoi)

But also, less commonly:

- Echinopsis cuzcoensis (Trichocereus cuzcoensis)
- Echinopsis lageniformis (Trichocereus bridgesii; Bolivian torch cactus)
- Echinopsis macrogona (Trichocereus macrogonus, Trichocereus peruvianus, Echinopsis peruvianus; Peruvian Torch cactus)

== See also ==
- Psychoactive cactus
- Lophophora williamsii (peyote)
- Pachycereus pringlei (cardón)
