= Mike Jay (author) =

British author, curator, and historian

Mike Jay is a British author, curator, and cultural historian. He is known for his work on the history of mind-altering drugs.

== Journalism ==
Jay writes regularly for the London Review of Books. His articles have also appeared in the New York Review of Books, Aeon, the New Statesman, and the New York Times.

== Bibliography ==
- Jay, Mike. Blue Tide: The Search for Soma. New York: Autonomedia, 1999.
- Jay, Mike. Emperors of Dreams: Drugs in the Nineteenth Century. Sawtry, UK: Dedalus, 2000. Revised and updated edition, 2011.
- Jay, Mike. The Air Loom Gang: The Strange and True Story of James Tilly Matthews and His Visionary Madness. London: Bantam Press, 2003. Revised and updated edition published as The Influencing Machine: James Tilly Matthews and the Air Loom (US edition titled A Visionary Madness).
- Jay, Mike. The Unfortunate Colonel Despard. London: Bantam Press, 2004. Reissued in a revised and updated edition as The Unfortunate Colonel Despard: And the British Revolution That Never Happened. Robinson, 2019.
- Jay, Mike. The Atmosphere of Heaven: The Unnatural Experiments of Dr. Beddoes and His Sons of Genius. New Haven: Yale University Press, 2009. Revised and retitled edition published as Free Radicals: How a Group of Romantic Experimenters Gave Birth to Psychedelic Science. New Haven: Yale University Press, 2025.
- Jay, Mike. High Society: Mind-Altering Drugs in History and Culture. London: Thames & Hudson, 2010.
- Jay, Mike. This Way Madness Lies: The Asylum and Beyond. London: Thames & Hudson, 2016. Published in partnership with the Wellcome Collection for the exhibition Bedlam: The Asylum and Beyond.
- Jay, Mike. Stranger Than Fiction: Essays by Mike Jay. London: Strange Attractor Press, 2018.
- Jay, Mike. Mescaline: A Global History of the First Psychedelic. New Haven: Yale University Press, 2019.
- Jay, Mike. Psychonauts: Drugs and the Making of the Modern Mind. New Haven: Yale University Press, 2023.
- Jay, Mike. Wireheads: An Unnatural History of Technology in the Brain. New Haven: Yale University Press, forthcoming October 2026.

=== As editor ===
- Jay, Mike, ed. Artificial Paradises: A Drugs Reader. London: Penguin, 1999.
- Jay, Mike, ed. Underworld of the East: Being Eighteen Years' Actual Experiences of the Underworlds, Drug Haunts and Jungles of India, China and Malaya, by James S. Lee. London: Green Magic, 2000. (Originally published London: Sampson Low, Marston & Co., 1935).
- Jay, Mike, and Michael Neve, eds. 1900: A Fin-de-Siècle Reader. London: Penguin, 1999.
- Barnett, Richard.Medical London: City of Diseases, City of Cures. Edited by Mike Jay. London: Strange Attractor Press, 2008.
