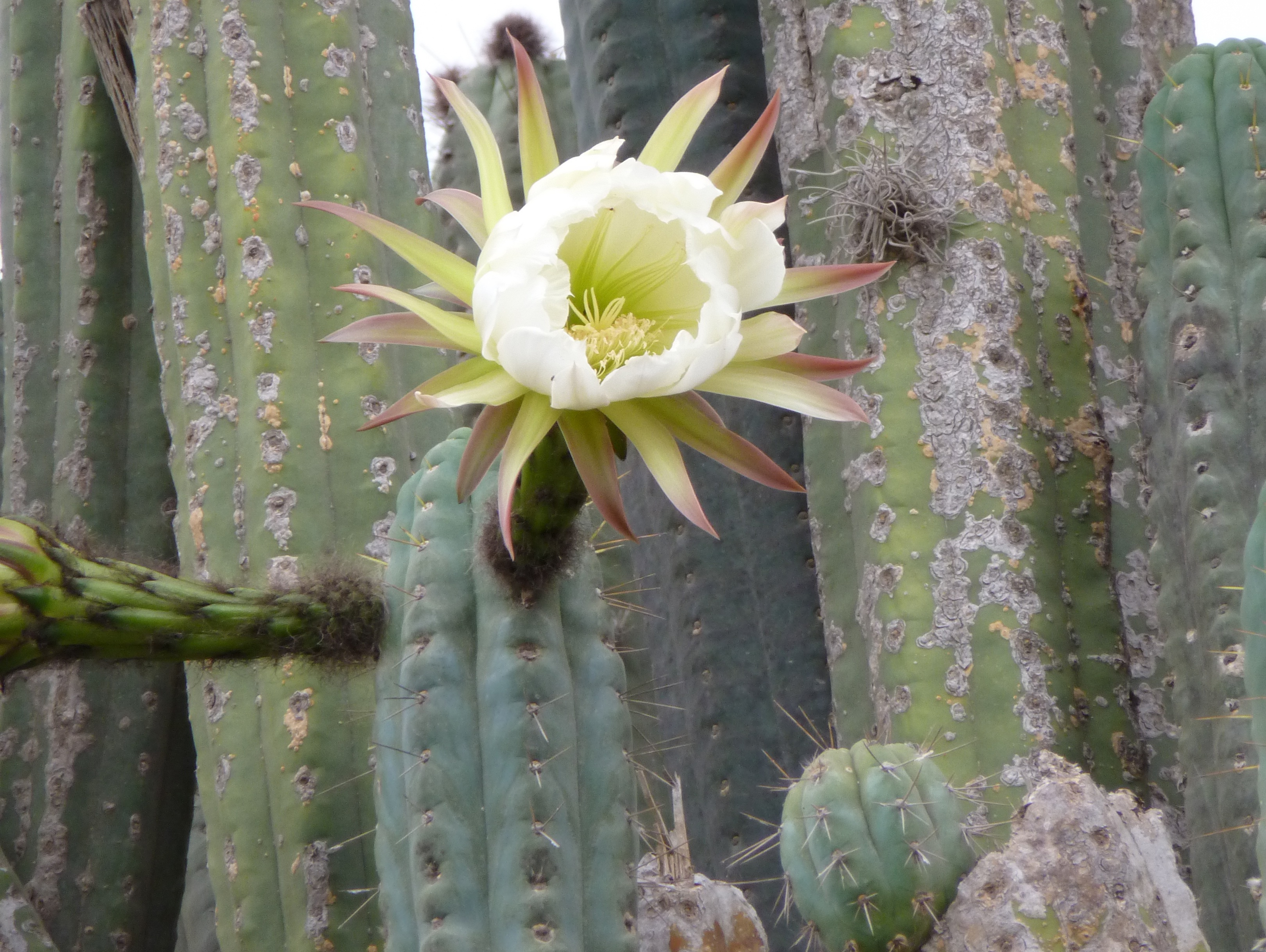
- Bolivian torch cactus

Conservation status
- Least Concern (IUCN 3.1)

Scientific classification
- Kingdom: Plantae
- Clade: Tracheophytes
- Clade: Angiosperms
- Clade: Eudicots
- Order: Caryophyllales
- Family: Cactaceae
- Subfamily: Cactoideae
- Genus: Echinopsis
- Species: E. lageniformis

Binomial name
- Echinopsis lageniformis (C.F.Först.) H.Friedrich & G.D.Rowley

Synonyms
- Cereus bridgesii Salm-Dyck; Cereus lageniformis C.F.Först.; Echinopsis scopulicola (F.Ritter) Mottram; Trichocereus bridgesii var. brevispinus Borg; Trichocereus bridgesii var. longispinus (C.A.Maass) Borg; Trichocereus bridgesii (Salm-Dyck) Britton & Rose; Trichocereus crassicostatus F.Ritter; Trichocereus riomizquensis F.Ritter; Trichocereus scopulicola F.Ritter

= Echinopsis lageniformis =

Species of cactus

Echinopsis lageniformis, synonyms including Echinopsis scopulicola and Trichocereus bridgesii, is a cactus native to Bolivia. It is known as the Bolivian torch cactus. Among the indigenous populations of Bolivia, it is sometimes called achuma or wachuma, although these names are also applied to related species such as Trichocereus macrogonus which are also used for their psychedelic effects.

== Description ==
The plant has a light greenish to bluish color grows shrubby to tree-shaped somewhat branching and usually has four to eight ribs. It can grow 2–5 metres (6.6–16.4 ft) tall with stems of up to 15–20 centimetres (5.9–7.9 in) in diameter. The areoles on them are large and are 1.5 to 3 cm (0.59 to 1.18 in) apart. The two to six spines that emerge from them are unequal. Spines can range in coloration from honey-coloured to brown. These spines can grow up to 0.1–7 cm in length and in fully grown plants are spaced evenly on the ribs, 2.5 to 3 cm apart.

The long, funnel-shaped, 15 to 18 cm (5.9 to 7.1 in) long white fragrant flowers open at night. They are 16 to 20 cm (6.3 to 7.9 in) long. The spherical fruits are hairy and are 4 to 6 cm (1.6 to 2.4 in) long.

== Distribution ==
The plant comes from departments of La Paz, Cochabamba, Tarija and Chuquisaca Bolivia at altitudes of 1000 to 3300 meters. Among the native populations of Bolivia it is sometimes called achuma or wachuma, although these names are also applied to related species, such as Echinopsis pachanoi, which also have hallucinogenic effects. However, in regions where it is the dominant species, such as the La Paz area of Bolivia, these names refer exclusively to this plant.

== Cultivars ==
Several varieties of this species are highly prized by ornamental cactus collectors. These include two variants of monstrose growth, and the more recently developed clone Trichocereus bridgesii monstrose crested that exhibits both monstrose and cristate growth. These all tend to be slower growing than the standard form of the species, but owing to their highly unusual shapes, they are sought after by cactus collectors. The monstrose form of Echinopsis lageniformis is known as the penis plant or penis cactus. Contrary to the typical columnar habit of the species, this cultivar displays short stem sections that branch avidly, forming a low spiny bush. The upper part of each stem segment is smooth and spineless, resembling a penis. The lower part is spiny and shows a tendency to form ribs. The plant is light green. The German name for this cultivar, Frauenglück, more euphemistic than its English equivalent, translates as "women's joy".

Other highly valued cultivars are called Alko, Ben, Crown of Thorns, Experiment, Fahim`s Bridgesii #1, Fields Bridge, Foolsbreath (minty blue-green, occasionally semi-monstrose), Kai, Rita (blue-green/blue-grey), Jiimz Twin Spine, Nimbin, and Urban Tribes 2.

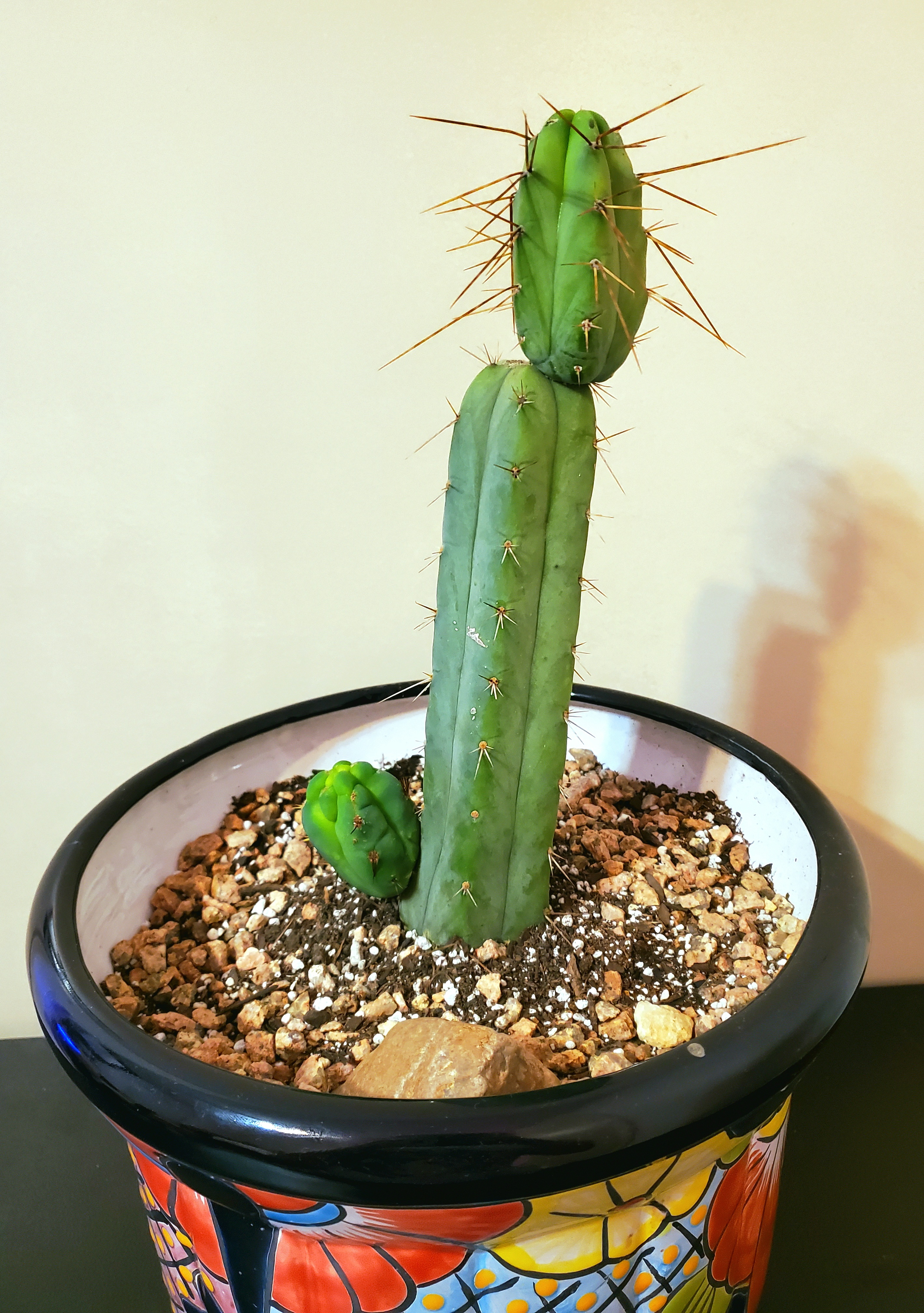
Cultivar Jiimz

== Psychoactivity ==
Like other species related to it, it has an ancient shamanic use in its place of origin. The plant contains a number of psychoactive alkaloids, in particular the well-studied chemical mescaline, typically at levels higher than Echinopsis pachanoi. Echinopsis lageniformis is thought to be the most potent and preferred species of mescaline-containing San Pedro cactus based on anecdotal evidence and laboratory work. The concentrations for specimens from various locations vary considerably and E. lageniformis may often contain more consistent mescaline content than E. pachanoi. However, a level of 0.56% mescaline content by dry weight was reported for some weaker E. lageniformis, while more than 2% was reported for some extraordinary cultivars of E. pachanoi. Chemical analyses of some variants of this species are not conclusive nor do they apply to all strains of the species. Mescaline is not evenly distributed within single specimens of E. lageniformis. Outside of its native habitat, it is one of the lesser known of the Trichocereus cacti for ornamental uses. This is not true in areas where it is the dominant species, for example, the La Paz area of Bolivia.

== Gallery ==
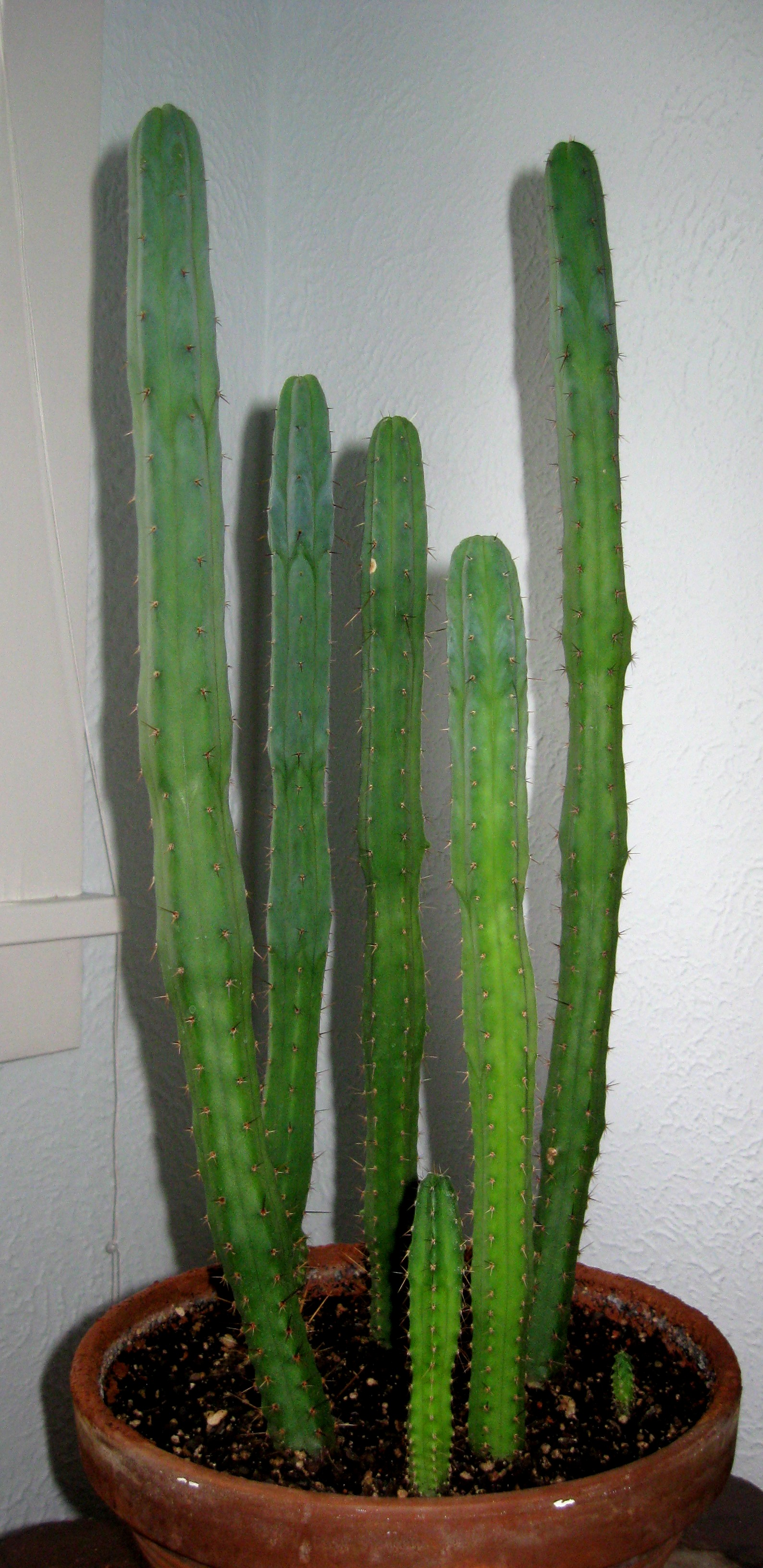
Five-year-old Echinopsis lageniformis that have been grown indoors.

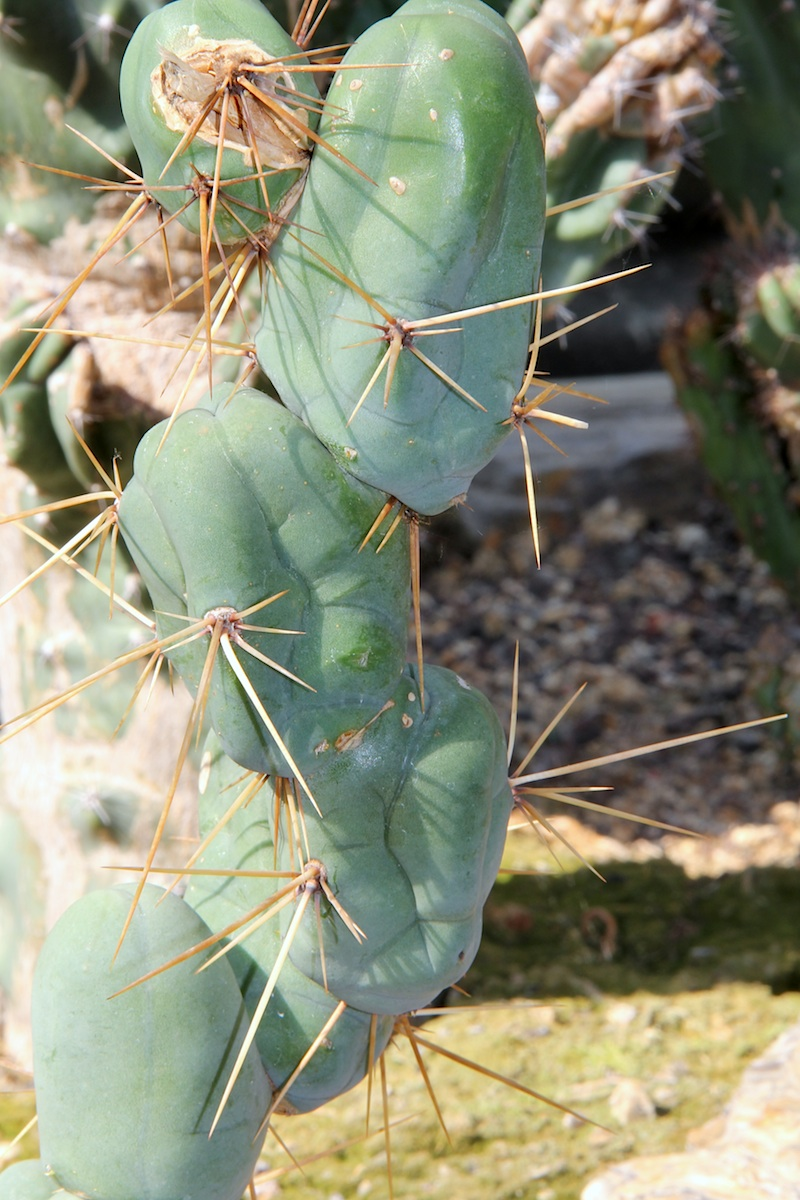
Echinopsis lageniformis f. monstrose (short form or 'Clone B') (syn. Trichocereus bridgesii monstrose)

Echinopsis lageniformis f. monstrose (Long form or 'Clone A') also known as penis plant

== See also ==
- Psychedelic plants
