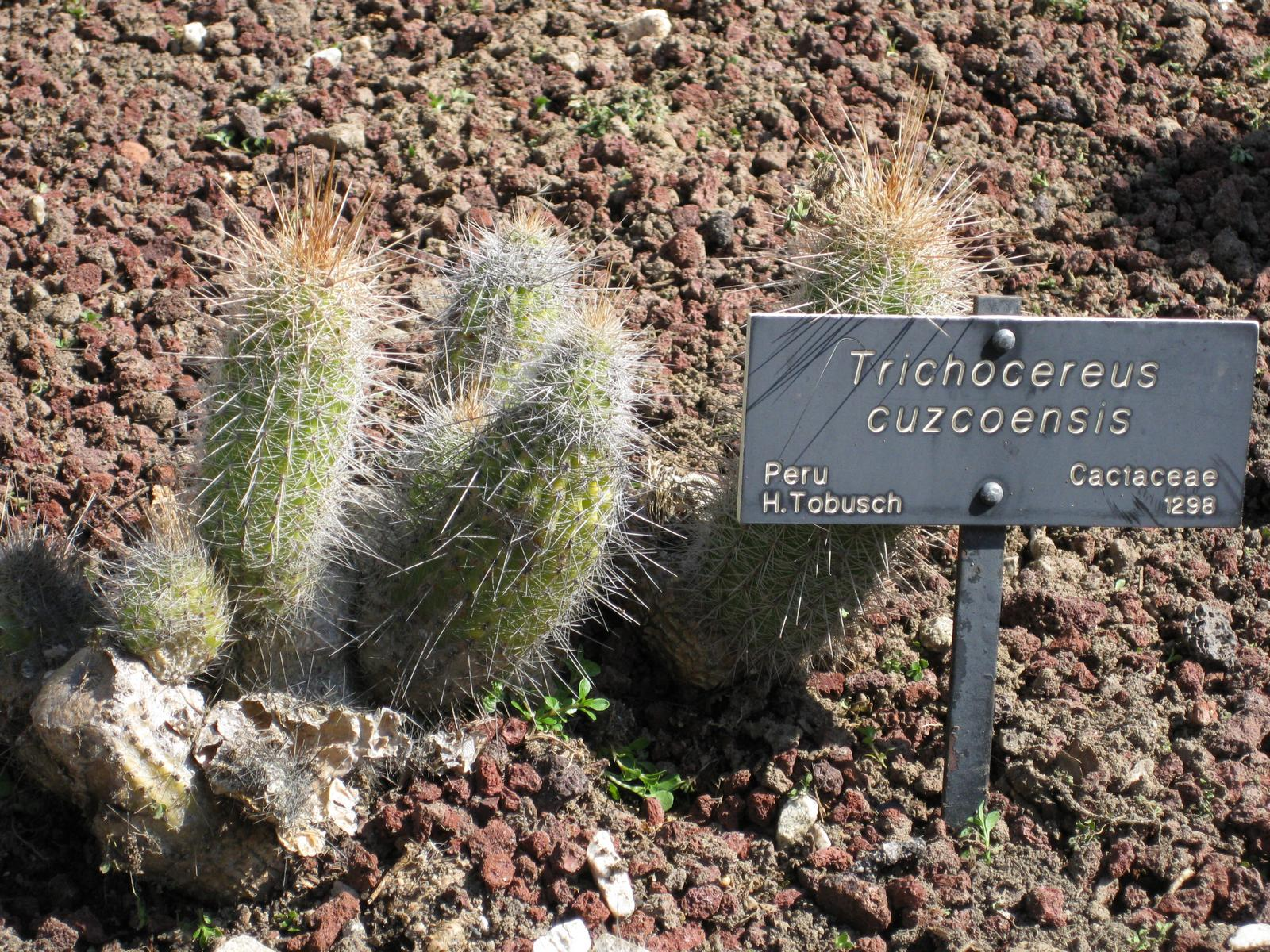

Conservation status
- Least Concern (IUCN 3.1)

Scientific classification
- Kingdom: Plantae
- Clade: Tracheophytes
- Clade: Angiosperms
- Clade: Eudicots
- Order: Caryophyllales
- Family: Cactaceae
- Subfamily: Cactoideae
- Genus: Echinopsis
- Species: E. cuzcoensis

Binomial name
- Echinopsis cuzcoensis (Britton & Rose) H.Friedrich & G.D.Rowley

Synonyms
- Cereus cuzcoensis (Britton & Rose) Werderm. 1931; Trichocereus cuzcoensis Britton & Rose 1920; Azureocereus deflexispinus Backeb. 1958; Cereus deflexispinus Rauh & Backeb. 1956 publ. 1957; Echinopsis knuthiana (Backeb.) H.Friedrich & G.D.Rowley 1974; Echinopsis tarmaensis (Rauh & Backeb.) H.Friedrich & G.D.Rowley 1974; Echinopsis tulhuayacensis (Ochoa ex Backeb.) H.Friedrich & G.D.Rowley 1974; Trichocereus cuzcoensis var. knuthianus (Backeb.) F.Ritter 1958; Trichocereus knuthianus Backeb. 1937; Trichocereus tarmaensis Rauh & Backeb. 1956 publ. 1957; Trichocereus tulhuayacensis Ochoa ex Backeb. 1957

= Echinopsis cuzcoensis =

Species of cactus

Echinopsis cuzcoensis is a species of Echinopsis cactus found in Peru.

== Description ==
Echinopsis cuzcoensis grows tree-shaped with numerous, somewhat spreading branches and reaches heights of 5 to 6 meters. The cylindrical shoots are green. There are seven to eight low and rounded ribs. The areoles on them are 1 to 1.5 cm (0.39 to 0.59 in) apart. About twelve very strong, stiff thorns emerge from them and are swollen at their base. The thorns are up to 7 cm (2.8 in) long.

The funnel-shaped, white flowers are fragrant. They are open day and night. The flowers are 12 to 14 cm (4.7 to 5.5 in) long.

== Distribution ==
Echinopsis cuzcoensis is widespread in the Cusco region of Peru at altitudes of 3100 to 3600 meters.

== Taxonomy ==
The first description by Nathaniel Lord Britton and Joseph Nelson Rose was published in 1920 as Trichocereus cuzcoensis. The specific epithet cuzcoensis refers to the occurrence of the species near the Peruvian city of Cusco. Nomenclature synonyms are Cereus cuzcoensis (Britton & Rose) Werderm. (1931) and Trichocereus cuzcoensis Britton & Rose (1920).
