= Richard Barnett (historian) =

British medical historian

Richard Barnett (born 1980) is a medical historian and the writer of six non-fiction books: Medical London: City of Diseases, City of Cures, The Dedalus Book of Gin, and a trilogy with Thames & Hudson: The Sick Rose, Crucial Interventions, and Smile Stealers.

In The Lancet, Niall Boyce wrote of The Sick Rose, "the excellent choices of image, high production standards, and formidable scholarship of The Sick Rose suggest that it is a book that will endure. I would recommend it to anyone with an interest in art, medicine, history, or, simply, the difficult and exhausting business of having and maintaining a body." The Guardian praised the book as well, stating, "Richard Barnett's superbly erudite and lucid accompanying text would really suffice in itself as an introduction to the history of western medical science."

Anisha Gupta wrote in Nature of The Smile Stealers, "Barnett expertly narrates the 'medical history' that has shaped the dental profession from its gruesome origins of the 'tooth puller', through to its modern day format of the skilled clinical service provider and aesthetician of the twenty-first century." The Engineering & Technology magazine reviewer found the work "stands out among other 'dental' publications both in quality and in quantity. ... What I particularly like about 'The Smile Stealers' is its often irreverent, tongue-in-cheek (in the true sense) tone ..." The Smile Stealers was the basis for the "Teeth" exhibition at the Wellcome Collection in London, in 2018.

His expertise in the history of medicine led to him becoming the 2014 Scholar in Residence at the Morbid Anatomy Library in New York, and to being the historical consultant for BBC 2's short-running historical comedy Quacks. He was also a judge for the Wellcome Book Prize and the MacCarthy Award, both in their founding years.
