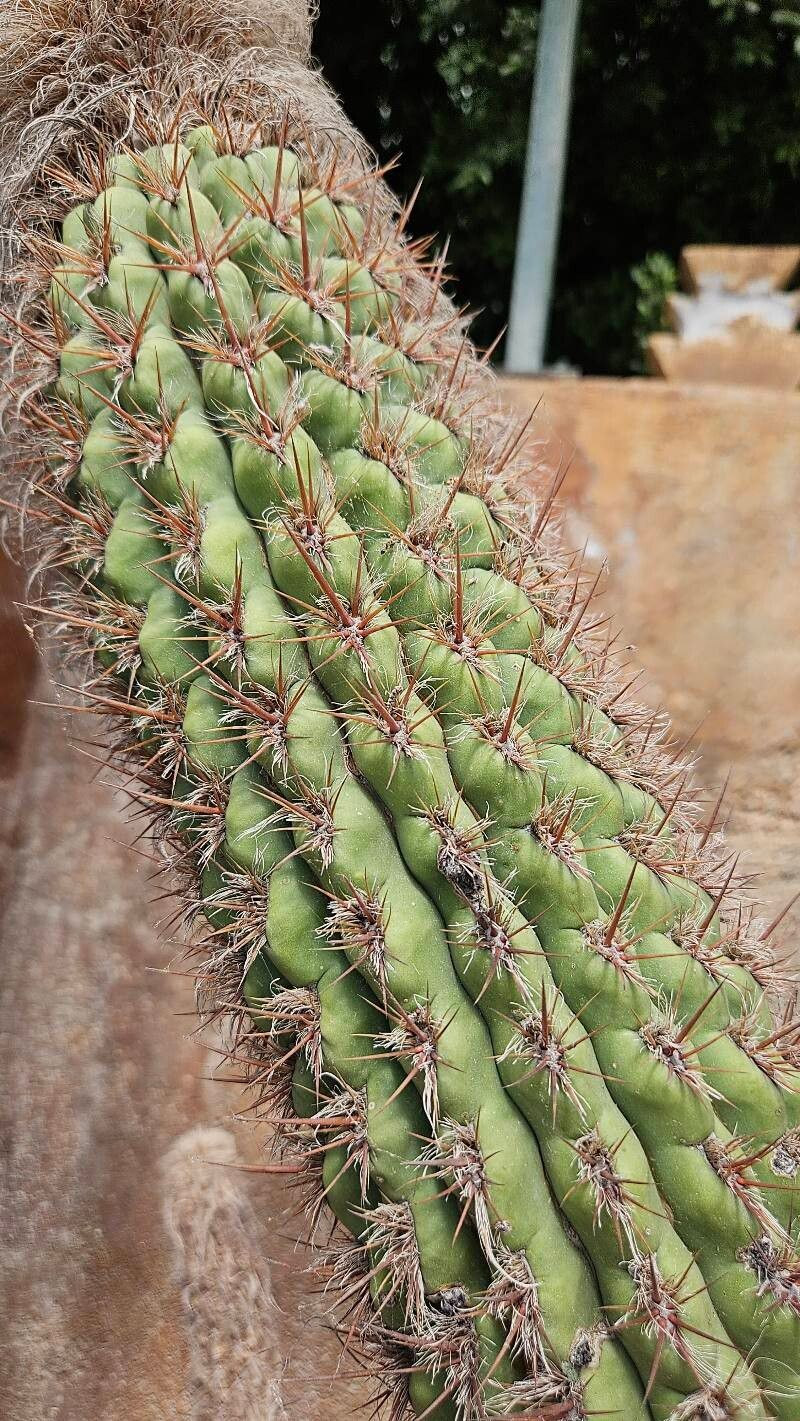

Scientific classification
- Kingdom: Plantae
- Clade: Tracheophytes
- Clade: Angiosperms
- Clade: Eudicots
- Order: Caryophyllales
- Family: Cactaceae
- Subfamily: Cactoideae
- Genus: Echinopsis
- Species: E. uyupampensis

Binomial name
- Echinopsis uyupampensis Backeb.

Synonyms
- Echinopsis uyupampensis (Backeb.) Friedrich & G.D. Rowley; Echinopsis glauca (F.Ritter) H.Friedrich & G.D.Rowley; Echinopsis glauca f. pendens (F.Ritter) H.Friedrich & G.D.Rowley; Trichocereus glaucus F.Ritter; Trichocereus glaucus f. pendens F.Ritter; Trichocereus glaucus var. pendens (F.Ritter) Backeb.

= Echinopsis uyupampensis =

Species of cactus

Echinopsis uyupampensis is a species of cactus found in Chile and Peru.

== Description ==
Echinopsis uyupampensis grows shrubby with several branches 1–2 m long, 4–8 cm diameter turning gray green with age. Stems have 7–9 narrow and flat ribs that are not very high. The small areoles on them are light brown. From them spring eight to ten irregularly arranged spines, which are thickened at their base. The spines are black and brown with 7–10 radial spines, which are 2–15 mm long, and 3–6 central spines, which are 2–8 cm long.

The funnel-shaped, pale yellow to white flowers are reddish on the outside, 13–19 centimeters long, opening at night time. Tthe flower buds are covered with hairs. Fruits are 4 cm long and 3 cm in diameter.

== Distribution ==
Echinopsis uyupampensis is found at altitudes of around 400–600 meters in Peru in the department of Arequipa, in the mountains of the lower Rio Tambo, and in the Ilo region of the department of Moquegua. The species is also found in Chile, where it grows on cliffs in Arica and Parinacota.

== Taxonomy ==
The first description as Echinopsis uyupampensis by Curt Backeberg was published in 1936. The specific epithet uyupampensis refers to the occurrence of the species near Uyupampa in the Arequipa region of Peru. Heimo Friedrich and Gordon Douglas Rowley placed the species in the genus Echinopsis in 1974.
