= Francisco Hernández =

Francisco Hernández may refer to:

- Francisco Hernández de Toledo (1514–1587), naturalist and court physician to the King of Spain
- Francisco Hernández de Córdoba (founder of Nicaragua) (c. 1475–1526)
- Francisco Hernández de Córdoba (Yucatán conquistador) (died 1517), Spanish conquistador
- Francisco Hernández Ortiz-Pizarro (1555–1613), founder of Fort Calbuco
- Francisco Hernández (footballer, born 1949) (1949–2019), football player from Costa Rica
- Francisco Hernández (Mexican footballer) (1924–2011), player who competed at the FIFA World Cup
- Francisco Hernández Tomé (died 1872), Spanish mural painter
- Francisco Jose Hernandez (born 1936), Cuban exile and president of the Cuban American National Foundation
- Francisco Hernández (rugby union) (born 1988), Spanish rugby sevens player
- Francisco Hernandez (politician) (born 1990 or 1991), New Zealand politician
