= Echinopsis macrogona =

Conservation status
- Least Concern (IUCN 3.1)

Scientific classification
- Kingdom: Plantae
- Clade: Embryophytes
- Clade: Tracheophytes
- Clade: Spermatophytes
- Clade: Angiosperms
- Clade: Eudicots
- Order: Caryophyllales
- Family: Cactaceae
- Subfamily: Cactoideae
- Genus: Echinopsis
- Species: E. macrogona

Binomial name
- Echinopsis macrogona (Salm-Dyck) H.Friedrich & G.D.Rowley

Synonyms
- Cereus macrogonus Salm-Dyck; Cereus rosei Werderm.; Echinopsis macrogona var. macrogona; Echinopsis peruviana (Britton & Rose) H.Friedrich & G.D.Rowley; Echinopsis peruviana subsp. puquiensis (Rauh & Backeb.) Ostolaza; Echinopsis puquiensis (Rauh & Backeb.) H.Friedrich & G.D.Rowley; Echinopsis trichosa (Cárdenas) H.Friedrich & G.D.Rowley; Trichocereus macrogonus (Salm-Dyck) Riccob.; Trichocereus macrogonus var. peruvianus (Britton & Rose) Lodé; Trichocereus macrogonus subsp. peruvianus (Britton & Rose) Lodé; Trichocereus pachanoi f. peruvianus (Britton & Rose) F.Ritter; Trichocereus peruvianus Britton & Rose; Trichocereus peruvianus subsp. puquiensis (Rauh & Backeb.) Ostolaza; Trichocereus puquiensis Rauh & Backeb.; Trichocereus tacnaensis F.Ritter; Trichocereus trichosus Cárdenas

Species of cactus

Echinopsis macrogona, synonym Trichocereus macrogonus, is a species of cactus found in Bolivia and Peru. Echinopsis macrogona is one of a number of similar species that may be called San Pedro cactus and is also known as the Peruvian torch cactus. Indigenous names include achuma and huachuma, although these too may be applied to similar species.

== Description ==
The species has erect stems, 2.5–5 m (8–16 ft) tall, with branches generally with a diameter of 6–15 cm (2–6 in), occasionally more. At the base of the stem there are usually seven or eight ribs. Generally the species has relatively few ribs, typically six to eight, occasionally five or nine. The circular areoles are 6 mm (0.2 in) across, grey or dark brown, with needle-like spines, and are spaced more than 2.5 cm (1.0 in) apart. The number and length of the spines varies. Older areoles may have up to 20, with three or four prominent, longer and more robust central spines up to 5 cm (2.0 in) long. The spines are darker at the end. The flowers are carried mostly near the top of the stems. In total they may be up to 21 cm (8.3 in) long. The tepals may be pale yellow or yellowish green, rarely pink. The small seeds are broadly ovoid, 0.9–1.1 mm (0.04–0.04 in) long.

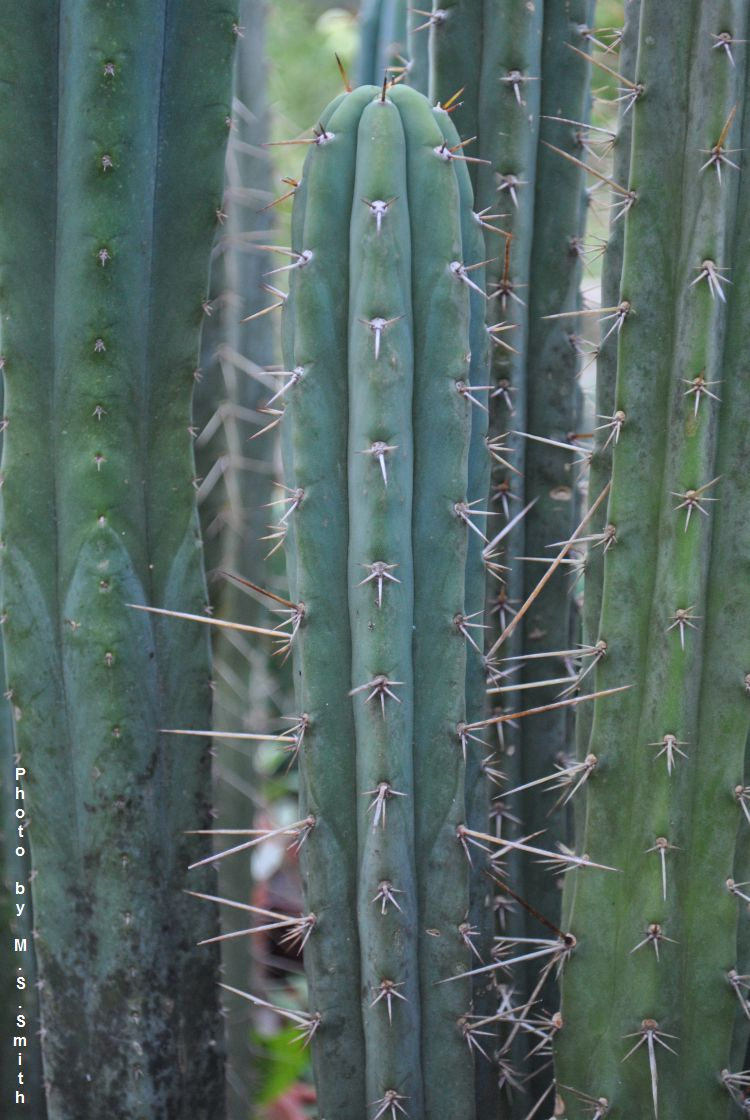
Stem

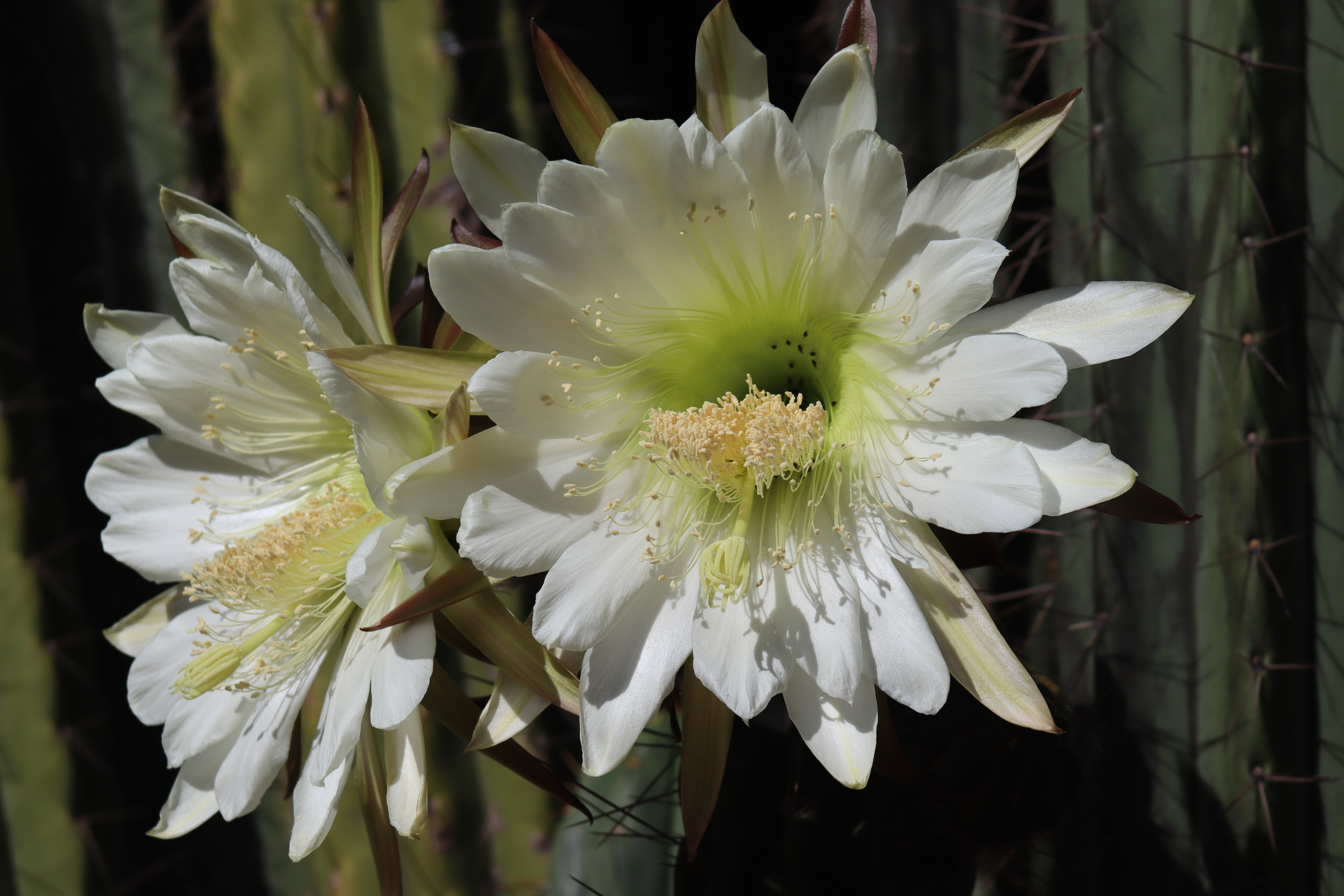
Flower

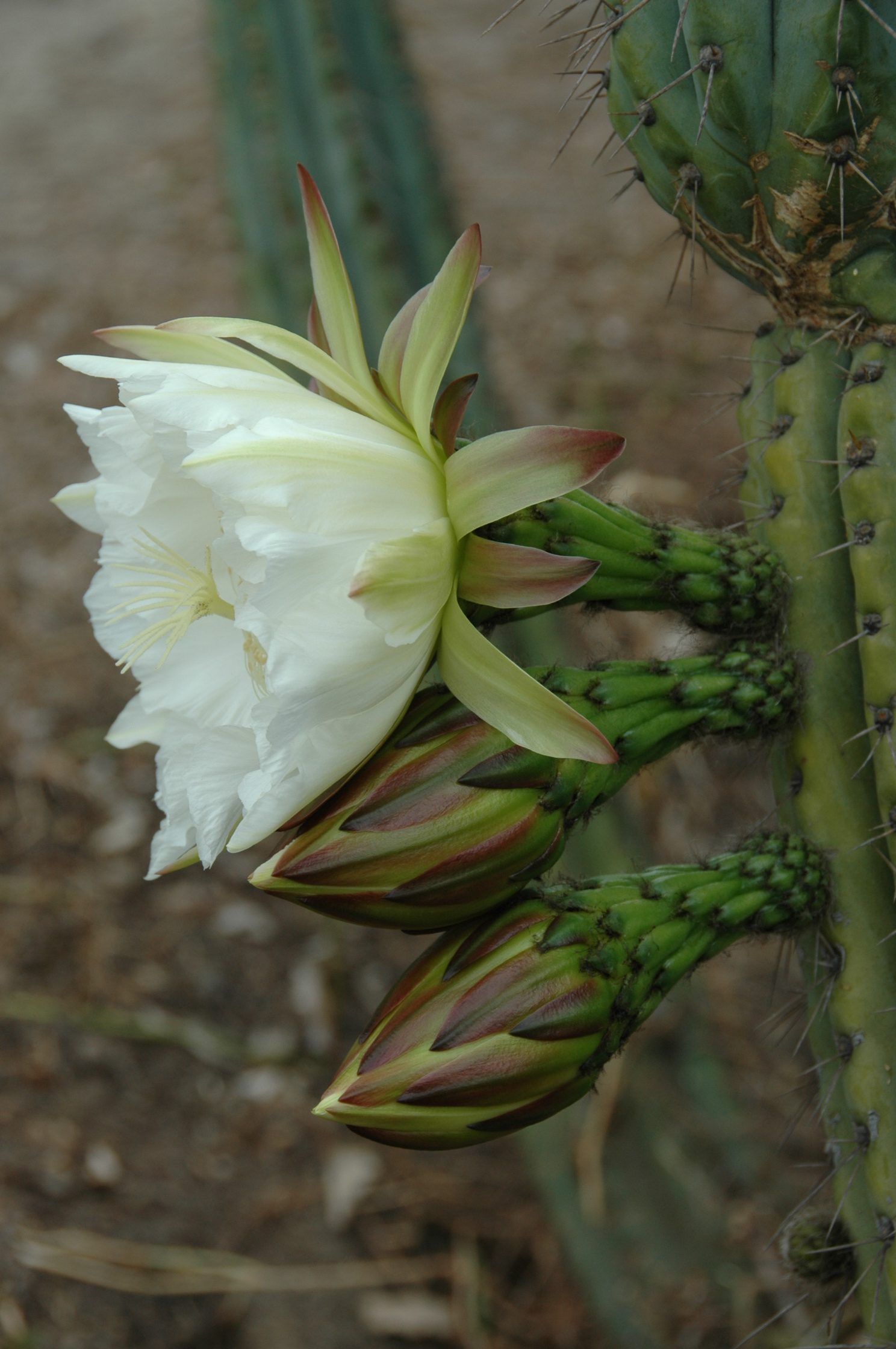
Flower and buds side view

== Taxonomy ==
The first description as Cereus macrogonus by Joseph zu Salm-Reifferscheidt-Dyck was published in 1850. The specific epithet macrogonus is derived from the Greek words makros for 'large' and gonia for 'edge' and refers to the ribs of the species. Vincenzo Riccobono placed the species in the genus Trichocereus in 1909. Heimo Friedrich and Gordon Douglas Rowley placed the species in the genus Echinopsis in 1974 as Echinopsis macrogona.

Other names have been applied to Echinopsis macrogona. The taxonomy of the species was revised in 2012 by Sofía Albesiano and Roberto Kiesling when the species was treated in the genus Trichocereus. In particular, they sank Trichocereus peruvianus and Trichocereus pachanoi into T. macrogonus, treating T. pachanoi as T. macrogonus var. pachanoi. The number and size of the spines was regarded as a distinguishing feature of the two varieties, although this was noted to be a variable character, influenced by environmental conditions: cultivated plants develop more spines when moved to sunnier positions. As of 2023, Plants of the World Online treated T. peruvianus or Echinopsis peruviana as a synonym of E. macrogona, but treated T. pachanoi as the separate species Echinopsis pachanoi.

== Distribution ==
As of November 2025, Plants of the World Online regarded the species as native to Bolivia and Peru, and introduced to the Balearic Islands, the Canary Islands, Colombia, and mainland Spain. However, plants are widely cultivated making the true origins of the species difficult to determine. It has been speculated that the original native distribution may only be the high valleys of Peru and perhaps also northwestern Bolivia.

== Mescaline content ==
This species of cactus has been used by humans for several millennia. The oldest find was located in the Guitarrero Cave, in the Áncash region in Peru. In this cave, inhabited continuously since 8600 BCE, a high concentration of E. macrogona pollen from the oldest phase of human occupation has been detected, as well as some fragments of cactus, which would testify to the intentional introduction of this plant inside the cave. Ritual uses of the species are depicted on pre-Columbian Peruvian ceramics and other archaeological objects, with one use dated to about 1300 BCE. Indigenous names include achuma and huachuma.

Echinocereus macrogona is one of a number of species native to the Andes that have been reported to contain the psychoactive alkaloid mescaline (reports may use various synonyms of the currently accepted names). Another species is Echinopsis lageniformis. All the columnar species thought to be psychoactive have been called "San Pedro" in Spanish. Reported concentrations of mescaline vary widely, with causes suggested to include: taxonomic uncertainty leading to difficulties in identification; genetic differences between species and within populations; environmental factors, such as temperature and water availability, affecting plants during growth; and variations in laboratory techniques.

Some studies have reported no mescaline content in wild-harvested Peruvian specimens of E. macrogona, and in plants grown in Europe. In those studies that have compared different species and cultivars, the concentrations found were very variable. In samples identified as Echinopsis pachanoi, the lowest found was 0.4% of dry weight compared to 4.7% for a form on sale in traditional Peruvian shamans' markets. The plants used by shamans are likely to be cultivars they have selected for their mescaline content. Mescaline is not evenly distributed within single specimens of E. lageniformis.
