= Inner Traditions – Bear & Company =

American book publishing company

- Founded: 1975
- Founder: Ehud Sperling
- Country of origin: United States
- Headquarters location: Rochester, Vermont
- Distribution: Simon & Schuster
- Publication types: Books
- Nonfiction topics: New Age
- Official website: innertraditions.com

Inner Traditions – Bear & Company, also known as Inner Traditions, is a book publisher founded by Ehud Sperling in 1975 and based in Rochester, Vermont in the United States. Their books are distributed by Simon & Schuster.

== History ==
Inner Traditions was founded by Ehud Sperling in June 1975 in New York City. The company's name came from the book The Inner Traditions of Magic, read by Sperling. They relocated to Rochester, Vermont in August 1986. Sperling still owns the company as of 2025.

In 2000, the independent publisher Bear & Company joined with Inner Traditions, moving from Santa Fe, New Mexico, where it had been founded in the early 1980s by Gerry Clow and astrologer Barbara Hand Clow. Afterwards, Inner Traditions became known as Inner Traditions/Bear & Company.

Inner Traditions began working with ebook sales in 2010. In 2017, Inner Traditions bought the Scotland-based Findhorn Press (founded 1971), formerly owned by the Findhorn Foundation. They converted Findhorn into an imprint.

== Topics ==
Inner Traditions publishes books in the "New Age" category or "mind-body-spirit" works related to spiritualism and esotericism, mysticism, neoshamanism, astrology, the perennial philosophy, visionary art, Earth mysteries, sacred sexuality, alternative medicine, and recordings of ethnic music and accompaniments for meditation. They were the publisher of Rick Strassman's DMT: The Spirit Molecule, later adapted into a film.

== Imprints and distribution ==
Inner Traditions publishes other imprints, including Findhorn Press, Healing Arts Press, Destiny Books, Sacred Planet Books, Earthdancer Books (previously an imprint of Findhorn), Park Street Press, Bindu Books, and Bear Cub Books. Inner Traditions and Bear & Company continue to be imprints. In 2019, Findhorn launched an audiobooks program.

A fourth of their titles are translations. They have a Spanish-language imprint, Inner Traditions en Español, first launched in 1993 with Lasser Press; Spanish-language books are the publisher's second biggest market. Following the closure of their distributor, the imprint was closed in 2003, only to be relaunched in 2022. They have separate divisions in India (founded in 1995) and in Canada (founded in 2009). They also publish books in German.

Beginning in 2013, books are distributed by Simon & Schuster. In Latin America, they are distributed by Editorial Océano and in Spain by Alfaomega. In 2025, they signed a deal with the Spanish spiritual publisher Grupo Gaia (an imprint of Alfaomega) to distribute their Spanish-language works in the U.S. and Canada.
