= Hallucinogen Rating Scale =

Scale for measuring the effects of hallucinogens

The Hallucinogen Rating Scale (HRS) is a psychometric scale for measuring the subjective effects of hallucinogens like psychedelic drugs and other psychoactive drugs. It includes 100 items that are mostly on a 5-point Likert scale and 6 factors/subscales (somaesthesia, affect, perception, cognition, volition, and intensity). The HRS is one of the most widely used scales for measuring hallucinogen effects, following the 5D-ASC and 11-ASC scales. It has been revised several times and has been translated into and validated in several different languages. The HRS was developed by Rick Strassman and colleagues and first described in 1992. It was first developed and used to assess the hallucinogenic effects of the psychedelic drug dimethyltryptamine (DMT). Subsequently, it has also been used with a variety of other psychoactive drugs, including psilocybin, ayahuasca, 2C-B, meta-chlorophenylpiperazine (mCPP), ketamine, dextromethorphan (DXM), salvinorin A/Salvia divinorum, Δ^{9}-tetrahydrocannabinol (THC), d-amphetamine, d-methamphetamine, 4-fluoroamphetamine, methylphenidate, MDMA, and MDEA.

== See also ==
- List of hallucinogen scales
- DMT: The Spirit Molecule
