= C12H15NO3 =

The molecular formula C_{12}H_{15}NO_{3} (molar mass : 221.25 g/mol) may refer to:

- Anhalonine
- Butylone (beta-keto-methylbenzodioxolylbutanamine)
- Carbofuran
- 3,4-Ethylenedioxymethcathinone
- Ethylone (methylenedioxyethcathinone)
- Isobubbialine
- Metaxalone
- Methylenedioxyphenmetrazine
- Hydrocotarnine
