= Spazio Interiore =

Edizioni Spazio Interiore
- Founded: 2012
- Founder: Giovanni Picozza
- Country of origin: Italy
- Headquarters location: Rome
- Publication types: Books
- Nonfiction topics: esotericism, philosophy, transpersonal psychology
- Official website: www.spaziointeriore.com

Spazio Interiore is an Italian publishing house, founded in Rome in October 2012. Specialized in psicotropia texts, esotericism, philosophy and transpersonal psychology. For the types of Spazio Interiore are published in Italy works of Alejandro Jodorowsky, Claudio Naranjo, Aryeh Kaplan, Rick Strassman, Stanislav Grof, Robert Monroe, E. J. Gold.
