= Heffter Research Institute =

Nonprofit organization

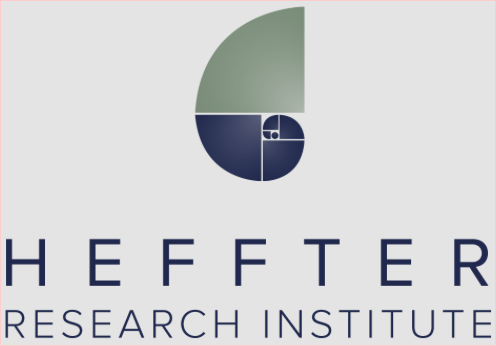
- Founded: 1993
- Type: 501(c)(3) Nonprofit
- Purpose: Scientific research with psychedelic drugs
- Website: Heffter Research Institute website

The Heffter Research Institute is a 501(c)(3) nonprofit organization that promotes research with classic hallucinogens and psychedelics, predominantly psilocybin, to contribute to a greater understanding of the mind and to alleviate suffering. Founded in 1993 as a virtual institute, Heffter primarily funds academic and clinical scientists and made more than $3.1 million in grants between 2011 and 2014. Heffter's recent clinical studies have focused on psilocybin-assisted treatment for end-of-life anxiety and depression in cancer patients, as well as alcohol and nicotine addiction.

== History ==
=== Arthur Heffter ===
Arthur Heffter was a German chemist/pharmacologist/physician who first isolated pure Mescaline from the peyote cactus in the late 1890s. He also proved that mescaline was the alkaloid in the cactus that is responsible for its psychoactive properties. This was the first psychedelic compound to be isolated and identified from its natural source, making Dr. Heffter the first scientist to study a pure psychedelic drug. Heffter's elucidation of the mescaline structure allowed it to be prepared by laboratory synthesis in 1919 by Ernst Späth, thus making it available to the wider scientific community.

=== Founding and history ===
The institute was founded in 1993 by David E. Nichols. Co-founders included Mark Geyer, Ph.D., Charles Grob, M.D. Dennis McKenna, Ph.D., George Greer, M.D., Phil Wolfson, M.D., and Jerry Patchen.

At the time, psychedelic research had been dormant for approximately 20 years and was not eligible to receive government funding, necessitating private funding to restart the field. The institute was created to secure the private funding and to evaluate research projects for their scientific merit. The institute was incorporated as a nonprofit organization in New Mexico, and received its 501(c)(3) designation from the Internal Revenue Service in 1994.

The first decade of research primarily focused on the mechanisms of action and effects of MDMA, along with clinical studies on ketamine treatment for Heroin addiction in Russia. The institute also funded several small fellowships for young scientists.

Since the turn of the century, the institute's work has focused primarily on psilocybin, including funding the first psychedelic treatment study in the U.S. in decades, treating obsessive-compulsive disorder with psilocybin at the University of Arizona. This study coincided with a number of neuroscience studies of psilocybin and a focus on treating anxiety and depression in cancer patients with psilocybin and addictions.

== Organization (board and staff) ==
The current board of directors consists of seven scientists and five Philanthropists. Dr. Nichols remains the president, with George Greer, M.D. as the medical director and Lynette Herring as the business manager.

== Research publications ==
The institute has provided funding for more than 80 Scientific publications concerned with psychedelic drug research.

=== Cancer distress ===
One supported research study found that a single dose of psilocybin significantly reduced anxiety and depressive symptoms in cancer patients. The institute then funded two larger clinical trials of the same treatment at New York University and Johns Hopkins University, which is expected to be published in 2016. Following that, the institute will be supporting an FDA Phase 3 study as a step toward gaining FDA approval of psilocybin for the treatment of anxiety and depression in cancer patients.

=== Addiction ===
Five scientific articles on Heffter-supported treatment of addictions with psilocybin have been published. Two recent small pilot studies on alcohol and smoking addiction showed significant positive results. As of early 2016, a large clinical trial is underway at New York University for alcohol dependence and at Johns Hopkins University for smoking.

Two earlier studies on the treatment of heroin addiction with ketamine also showed a significant benefit.

=== Spirituality ===
Several Heffter-supported studies on Spiritual experiences and practices involving ayahuasca and psilocybin have been published.

=== Neuroscience research ===
There have been more than 70 scientific publications resulting from Heffter-supported neuroscience research, mostly from the Heffter Research Center at the University of Zurich, where one of the board members, Franz Vollenweider, is the principal investigator. One of these studies found that psilocybin inhibits the processing of negative emotions in the brain.

== See also ==
- Multidisciplinary Association for Psychedelic Studies
- Beckley Foundation
- Arthur Heffter
