= Franz X. Vollenweider =

Swiss neuroscientist and psychiatrist (born 1954)

Franz Xaver Vollenweider
- Born: Lucerne, Switzerland
- Education: University of Zurich
- Known for: Neural basis of altered states of consciousness; cortico-striato-thalamo-cortical (CSTC) loop model
- Awards: Georg-Friedrich Götz Prize, University of Zurich (2000)
- Scientific career
- Fields: Neuropsychopharmacology, neurophysiology, neuroscience, consciousness studies
- Workplaces: Psychiatric University Hospital Zurich; Heffter Research Center Zürich; University of Zurich
- Website: UZH Profile

Franz X. Vollenweider (born 1954) is a Swiss neuroscientist and psychiatrist best known for his research on the neuronal mechanisms of psychedelic-induced altered states of consciousness, and for exploring their relevance to the understanding and treatment of affective and psychotic disorders.

He is the director of the Consciousness Research Unit at the Center for Psychiatric Research of the Psychiatric University Hospital Zurich, the director of the Heffter Research Center Zürich for Psychedelic Research (established in 1998 in collaboration with the Heffter Research Institute USA), and the president of the Swiss Neuromatrix Foundation, which supports research in consciousness science. Until 2019, Vollenweider served as co-director of the Center for Psychiatric Research, director of the Neuropsychopharmacology and Brain Imaging Unit, and professor of Psychiatry at the University of Zurich.

== Education ==
Vollenweider was born in Lucerne, Switzerland, and attended the KSALP Gymnasium in Lucerne. He completed a Diploma in Advanced Chemistry Laboratory Technology before studying biochemistry at ETH Zurich and medicine at the University of Zurich, where he received his MD in 1986. He earned a doctorate in experimental medicine in 1987 with a thesis on comparative toxicology conducted at the Institute of Toxicology — a joint venture of ETH Zurich and the University of Zurich.

He subsequently conducted postdoctoral research into glutamatergic neurotransmission at the Brain Research Institute of the University of Zurich. In 1989 he joined the Research Department of Jules Angst at the Psychiatric University Hospital Zurich (PUHZ), while in parallel investigating the neuronal basis of psychedelics and related compounds using functional neuroimaging at the PET Centre of the Paul Scherrer Institute (PSI‑ETH). He completed his clinical training, including a psychoanalytic training analysis, in 1995 and obtained board certification in psychiatry and psychotherapy. In 1996, he established the Neuropsychopharmacology and Brain Imaging Research Unit at the PUHZ.

== Research ==
The Psychiatric University Hospital Zurich (Burghölzli) has been regarded as an influential center for research on psychedelic substances since the discovery of LSD in 1943 and the identification of psilocybin in the 1960s by Swiss chemist Albert Hofmann. From the early 1950s onward, psychedelic and non-pharmacologically induced altered states of consciousness were investigated from psychopathological, psychoanalytic, and psychometric perspectives.

Since 1992, Vollenweider has continued and extended this multidisciplinary tradition by examining the molecular and neuronal circuit mechanisms underlying the psychological and therapeutic effects of classic psychedelics, dissociative anesthetics, and entactogens in humans. His work aims to clarify how, and to what extent, psychedelics and related compounds alter emotional, cognitive, and social processing, with the goal of informing the development of novel therapeutic approaches for neuropsychiatric disorders.

Vollenweider's group integrates methods from psychology, cognitive neuroscience, and systems biology, employing advanced neuroimaging and brain-stimulation techniques such as positron emission tomography (PET), functional magnetic resonance imaging (fMRI), electroencephalography (EEG) with event-related potentials (ERP), and transcranial magnetic stimulation combined with EEG (TMS‑EEG).

He has authored more than 200 scientific papers and a monograph on the mechanisms of action of psychedelics and related psychoactive compounds. His early studies focused on the psychometric characterization of the subjective and pharmacological effects of psilocybin, LSD, the S‑ and R‑ketamine enantiomers, and MDMA, as well as on identifying neurophysiological and neuroimaging markers with potential therapeutic relevance.

=== Serotonin 5-HT_{2A} receptor and psychedelic effects ===
His work demonstrated that the serotonin 5-HT_{2A} receptor is a key mediator of the psychedelic experience, supporting a range of perceptual, emotional, and cognitive effects in humans.

=== Cortico-striato-thalamo-cortical (CSTC) loop model ===
Building on neuroimaging studies and collaborative translational psychophysiological research with Mark A. Geyer, Vollenweider formulated the cortico‑striato‑thalamo‑cortical (CSTC) loop model, a neurobiological framework for explaining the subjective effects of psychedelics.

The CSTC model proposes that psychedelics disrupt thalamo‑cortical feedback circuits that regulate bottom‑up sensory gating and top‑down cognitive control, attention, and self‑awareness. According to this model, 5-HT_{2A} receptor activation in cortical and thalamic regions reduces thalamic filtering of sensory and interoceptive information, increasing the flow of unfiltered signals to the cortex and leading to a breakdown of hierarchical control and altered cortical network integration. Neuroimaging studies have provided empirical support for the CSTC model, reporting altered thalamo‑cortical connectivity during psychedelic states and associations with specific experiential phenomena. The model continues to be refined by Vollenweider's group and others.

=== Meditation and psychedelics ===
Another line of research examines whether combining contemplative practices such as Zen or Vipassana meditation with psychedelics may yield synergistic benefits — particularly in relation to personality development and mental health.

== Awards and honors ==
Vollenweider has received numerous honors, including:

- Achievement Award of the Swiss Society of Psychiatry (1990)
- Heffter Research Institute Award (1997)
- Georg-Friedrich Götz Prize of the University of Zurich (2000)
- British Association of Psychopharmacology Prize (2002)
- Multiple awards from the European College of Neuropsychopharmacology (1999, 2003, 2010, 2016)

== Selected publications ==
=== Books ===
- Halberstadt AL, Vollenweider FX, Nichols DE (eds.) (2018). Behavioral Neurobiology of Psychedelic Drugs. Springer, Berlin, Heidelberg. doi:10.1007/978-3-662-55880-5. Chinese edition: Chemical Industry Press, 2021. ISBN 978-7122377692.

=== Journal articles ===
- Vollenweider FX, Preller KH. Psychedelic drugs: neurobiology and potential for treatment of psychiatric disorders. Nat Rev Neurosci 2020; 21(11):611–24. doi:10.1038/s41583-020-0367-2
- Vollenweider FX, Kometer M. The neurobiology of psychedelic drugs: implications for the treatment of mood disorders. Nature Reviews Neuroscience 2010, 11:642–651. doi:10.1038/nrn2884
- von Rotz R, et al. Single-dose psilocybin-assisted therapy in major depressive disorder: A placebo-controlled, double-blind, randomised clinical trial. EClinicalMedicine 2023, 56:101809. doi:10.1016/j.eclinm.2022.101809
- Ort A, et al. TMS-EEG and resting-state EEG applied to altered states of consciousness: oscillations, complexity, and phenomenology. iScience 2023; 26(5):106589. doi:10.1016/j.isci.2023.106589
- Jungwirth J, et al. Psilocybin increases emotional empathy in patients with major depression. Mol Psychiatry 2025, 30:2665–2672. doi:10.1038/s41380-024-02875-0
- Stoliker D, et al. Neural mechanisms of psychedelic visual imagery. Mol Psychiatry 2025, 30:1259–1266. doi:10.1038/s41380-024-02632-3

== Media ==
Vollenweider has served as scientific advisor and on-screen participant in two documentary films:

- Narrenschwämme – von Pilzen, Gordon Wasson und anderen Sonderlingen (Magic Mushrooms – From Mushrooms, Gordon Wasson and Other Eccentrics [The Mushroom Man]) (1996)
- The Substance – Albert Hofmann's LSD (2011), directed by Martin Witz.
- Descending the Mountain: Exploring Psilocybin and the Nature of Consciousness (2021), directed by Maartje Nevejan.

== See also ==
- Altered States of Consciousness Rating Scale (ASC)
