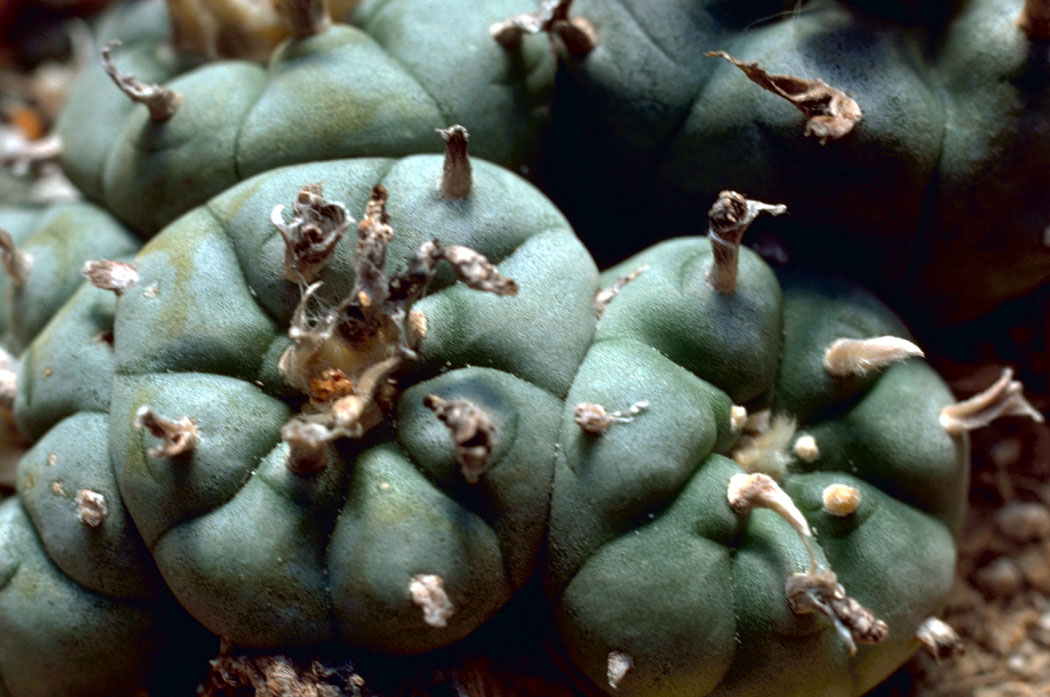
- Peyote in the wild

Conservation status
- Vulnerable (IUCN 3.1)

Scientific classification
- Kingdom: Plantae
- Clade: Tracheophytes
- Clade: Angiosperms
- Clade: Eudicots
- Order: Caryophyllales
- Family: Cactaceae
- Subfamily: Cactoideae
- Genus: Lophophora
- Species: L. williamsii

Binomial name
- Lophophora williamsii (Lem. ex J.F.Cels) J.M.Coult.

Synonyms
- Echinocactus williamsii Lemaire ex Salm-Dyck; Lophophora lewinii (K. Schumann) Rusby; Lophophora echinata Croizat; Lophophora fricii Habermann; L. williamsii var. fricii (Habermann) Grym; L. diffusa subsp. fricii (Habermann) Halda; Lophophora jourdaniana Haberman

= Peyote =

Species of psychoactive cactus

Peyote, (Note: Pronounced /peɪˈoʊti/ pay-OH-tee,) also known as Lophophora williamsii, (Note: Pronounced /ləˈfɒfərə wɪliˈæmziaɪ/) is a small, spineless cactus which contains psychoactive alkaloids, particularly mescaline. Peyote is a Spanish word derived from the Nahuatl peyōtl, (Note: pronounced [ˈpejoːt͡ɬ]) meaning "caterpillar cocoon", from a root peyōni, "to glisten".

It is native to southern North America, primarily found in desert scrub and limestone-rich areas of northern Mexico and south Texas, particularly in the Chihuahuan Desert at elevations of 100–1,500 m (330–4,920 ft). It flowers from March to May, and sometimes as late as September. Its flowers are pink or white, with thigmotactic anthers (like Opuntia). It is a small, spineless cactus that grows in clusters, produces edible fruits, and contains psychoactive alkaloids—primarily mescaline—at concentrations of about 0.4% when fresh and up to 6% when dried.

Peyote is a slow-growing cactus that can be cultivated more rapidly through techniques such as grafting. While wild populations in regions like south Texas have declined due to harvesting, cultivation and the use of alternatives like San Pedro are being explored as potential conservation approaches.

It has been used for over 5,000 years by Indigenous peoples of the Americas for ceremonial, spiritual, and folk medicine purposes. Its effects last up to 12 hours. The Native American Church considers ingestion of peyote a sacrament and uses it in all-night healing ceremonies to connect with the spiritual world. Native American Church members often personify peyote as a divine spirit akin to Jesus. In Wixarika (Huichol) culture, peyote is considered the soul of their religion and a visionary sacrament that connects them to their principal deities—corn, deer, peyote, and the eagle. Peyote and its psychoactive component mescaline are generally controlled substances worldwide, but many laws—including in Canada and the United States—exempt its use in authentic Native American religious ceremonies, with U.S. federal law and some states allowing such ceremonial use regardless of race.

== Description ==
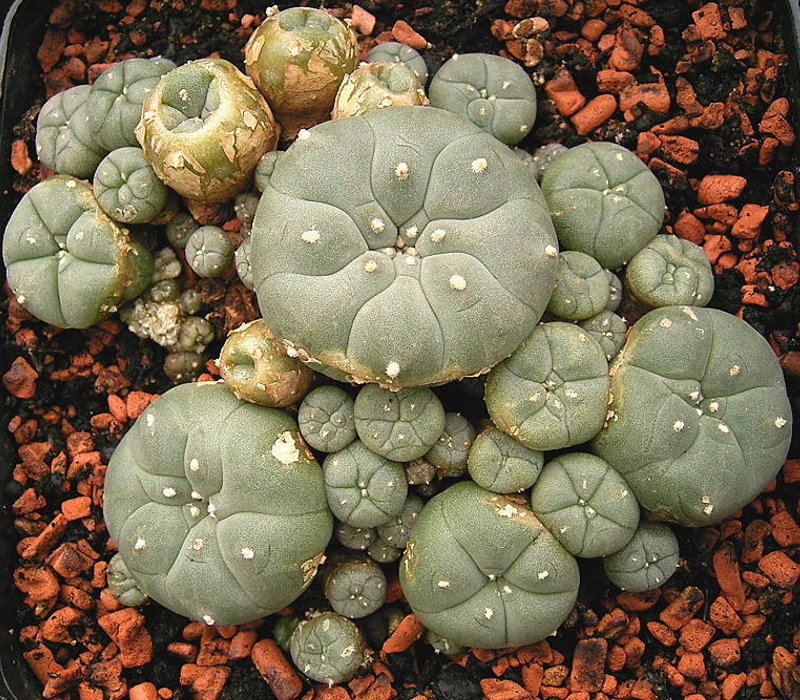
A group of Lophophora williamsii

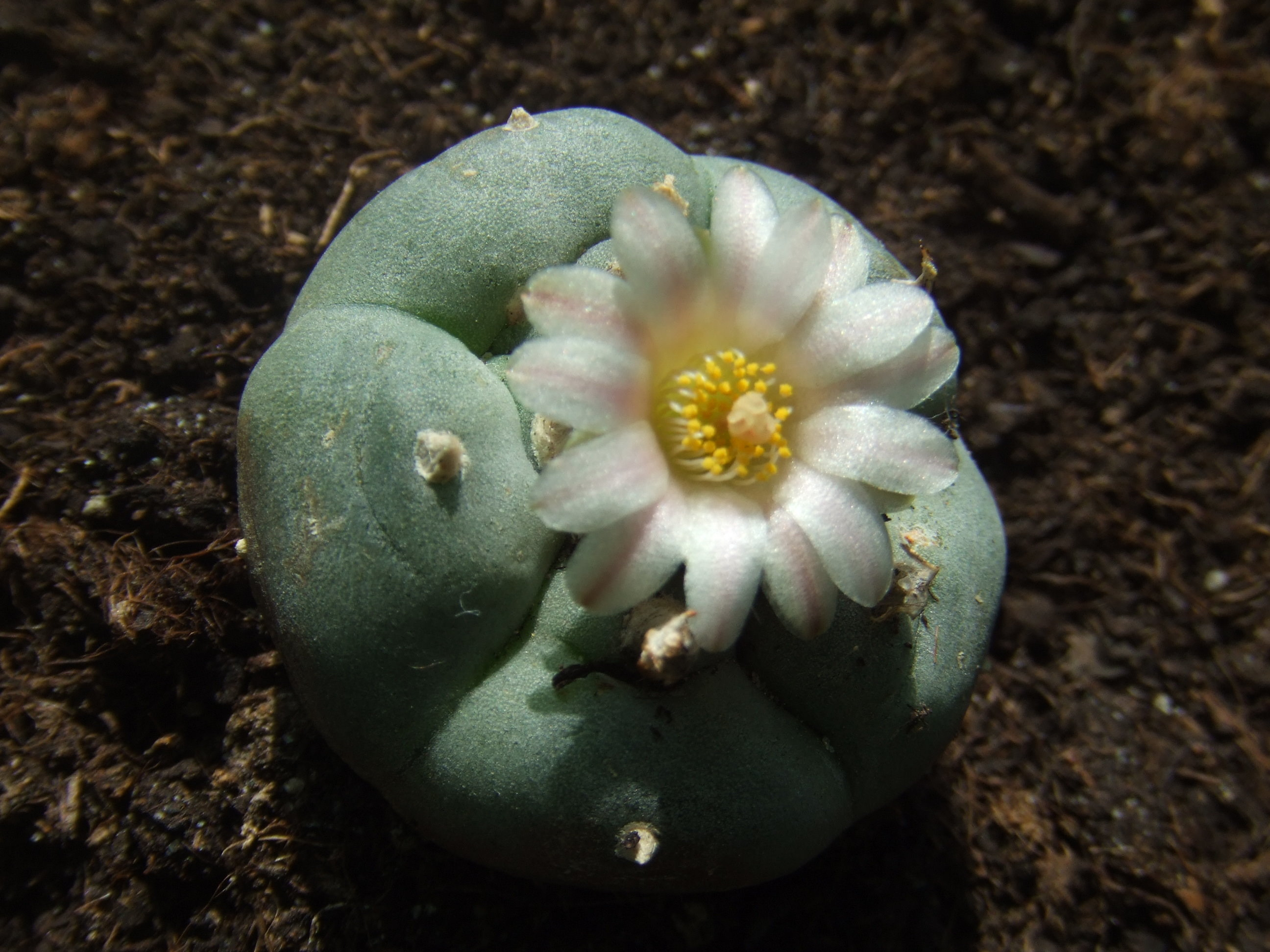
A flowering peyote

The various species of the genus Lophophora grow low to the ground and they often form groups with numerous, crowded shoots. The blue-green, yellow-green or sometimes reddish-green shoots are mostly flattened spheres with sunken shoot tips. They can reach heights of 2 to 7 cm (1 to 3 in) and diameters of 4 to 12 cm (2 to 5 in). There are often significant, vertical ribs consisting of low and rounded or hump-like bumps. From the cusp areoles arises a tuft of soft, yellowish or whitish woolly hairs. Spines are absent. Flowers are pink or white to slightly yellowish, sometimes reddish. They open during the day, are from 1 to 2.4 cm (0.4 to 0.9 in) long, and reach a diameter from 1 to 2.2 cm (0.4 to 0.9 in).

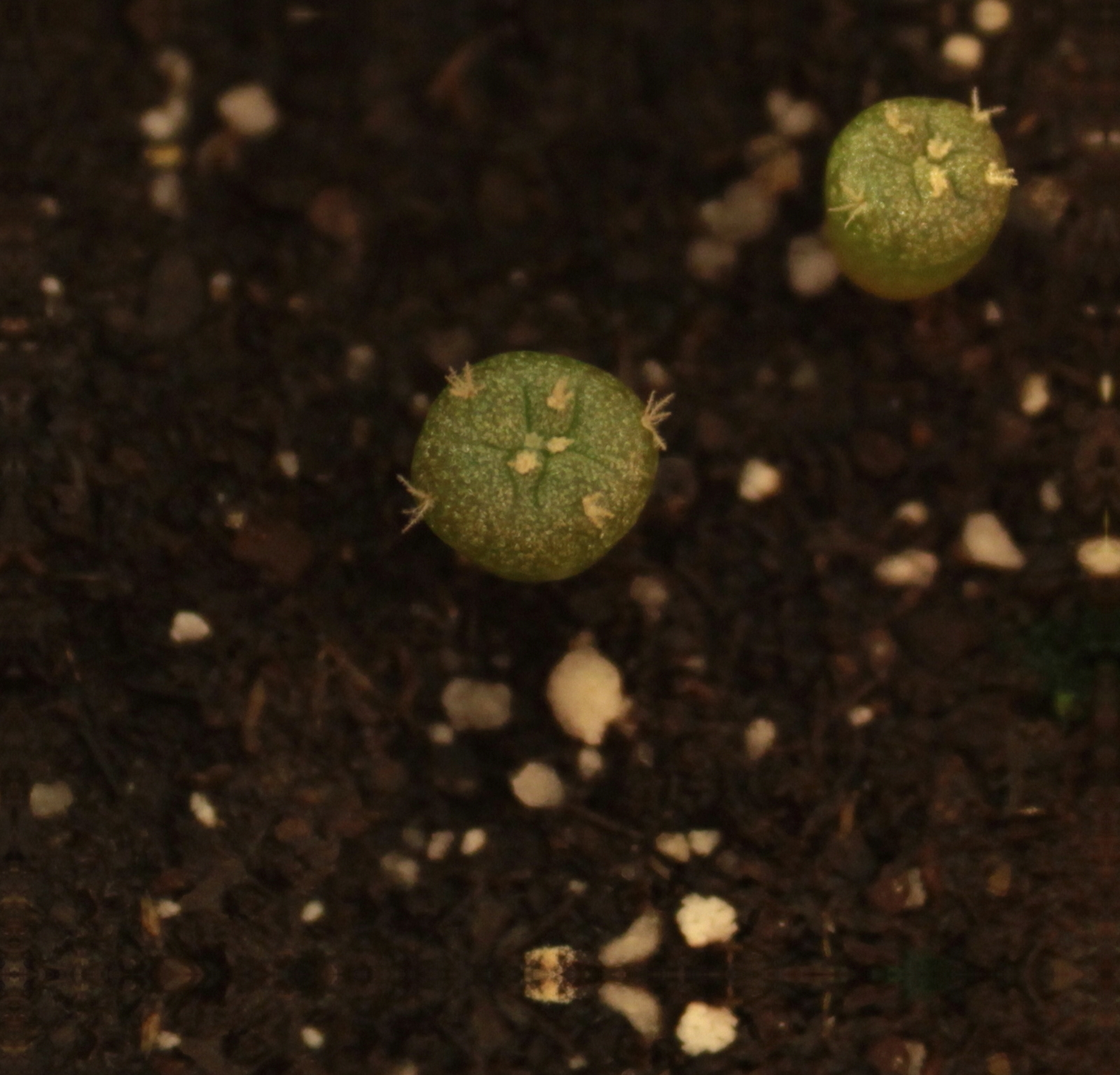
Lophophora williamsii seedling at roughly 1 1/2 months of age

The cactus produces flowers sporadically; these are followed by small edible pink fruit. The club-shaped to elongated, fleshy fruits are bare and more or less rosy colored. At maturity, they are brownish-white and dry. The fruits do not burst open on their own and they are between 1.5 to 2 cm (0.6 to 0.8 in) long. They contain black, pear-shaped seeds that are 1 to 1.5 mm long and 1 mm wide. The seeds require hot and humid conditions to germinate. Peyote contains a large spectrum of phenethylamine alkaloids. The principal one is mescaline for which the content of Lophophora williamsii is about 0.4% fresh (undried) and 3–6% dried.

== Taxonomy ==
French botanist Charles Antoine Lemaire described the species as Echinocactus williamsii in 1845. It was placed in the new genus Lophophora in 1894 by American botanist John Merle Coulter.

== Distribution and habitat ==
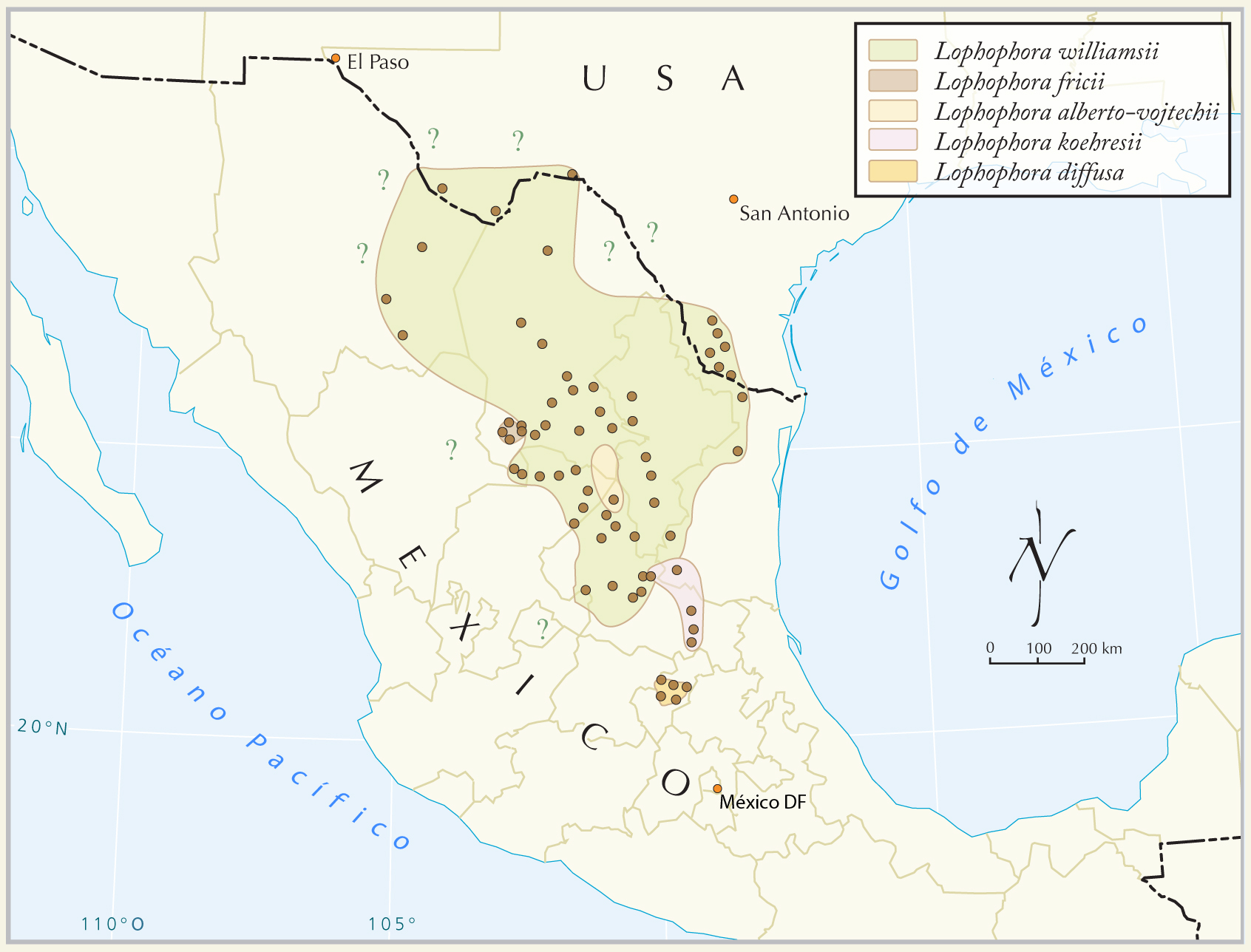
Range of wild peyote

L. williamsii is native to southern North America, mainly distributed in Mexico. In the United States, it grows in southern Texas. A 1970 field study described a population about 6 miles (9.7 km) south of Shafter, in Presidio County, as the northernmost and westernmost known occurrence. A later survey treated the Shafter population as the northwestern limit of the documented range and recorded vouchers in three herbaria. In Mexico, it grows in the states of Chihuahua, Coahuila, Nuevo León, and Tamaulipas in the north to San Luis Potosí and Zacatecas. It is primarily found at elevations of 100 to 1,500 m (330 to 4,920 ft) and exceptionally up to 1,900 m (6,200 ft) in the Chihuahuan Desert, but is also present in the milder climate of Tamaulipas. Its habitat is primarily in desert scrub, particularly thorn scrub in Tamaulipas. It is common on or near limestone hills.

In Tamaulipas, peyote commonly grows beneath other plants. A 2022 field study found 97.7% of sampled individuals under the foliage of facilitator species, with honey mesquite (Prosopis glandulosa) among the principal associated species.

== Constituents ==
Peyote contains a variety of alkaloids including mescaline, pellotine, anhalonidine, anhalamine, hordenine, lophophorine, and anhalonine, among others. In terms of total alkaloid content, mescaline makes up 30%, pellotine 17%, anhalonidine 14%, anhalamine 8%, hordenine 8%, lophophorine 5%, and anhalonine 3%. Other major alkaloids include anhalidine, anhalinine, and O-methylanhalonidine. Peyophorine is a minor constituent, while isoanhalamine, isoanhalidine, isoanhalonidine, and isopellotine are trace constituents. Tyramine and N-methyltyramine are also present in peyote. More than 50 different alkaloids have been isolated from peyote, but many of them in only minor or trace amounts.

Of peyote's major alkaloids, only mescaline is definitely known to be hallucinogenic, and is thought to be responsible for the psychedelic effects of the cactus. However, pellotine is a sedative and hypnotic and can produce marked sleepiness at sufficiently high doses. In addition, pellotine was reported to produce hallucinations at very high doses in one study. Pellotine is present in peyote in sufficient amounts to potentially cause sedation.

== Cultivation ==
Peyote grows slowly and can take up to ten years to mature. Grafting can accelerate growth and crown production and can be performed on both seedlings and mature plants. Growers commonly use Pereskiopsis for seedlings, while larger plants can be grafted onto columnar cacti such as San Pedro, Peruvian torch, and Bolivian torch. When grafted to Pereskiopsis, seedlings can flower and produce seed within two years. Wild peyote experiences long periods of drought and heat stress. In one experiment, six months of drought stress increased the mescaline concentration of cultivated plants; the review authors noted that potency may depend on growing conditions rather than simply on whether a plant is wild or cultivated. The top of the above-ground part of the cactus, the crown, consists of disc-shaped buttons. These are cut above the roots and sometimes dried. When done properly, the top of the root forms a callus and the root does not rot. When poor harvesting techniques are used, however, the entire plant dies. Peyote grows naturally in South Texas but has been over-harvested, to the point that the state has listed it as an endangered species. Cultivation is an important conservation tool for this particular species. Promoting San Pedro as a Peyote substitute may act as an intervention to reduce Peyote consumption.

== Use and effects ==
=== Psychoactivity and folk medicine ===
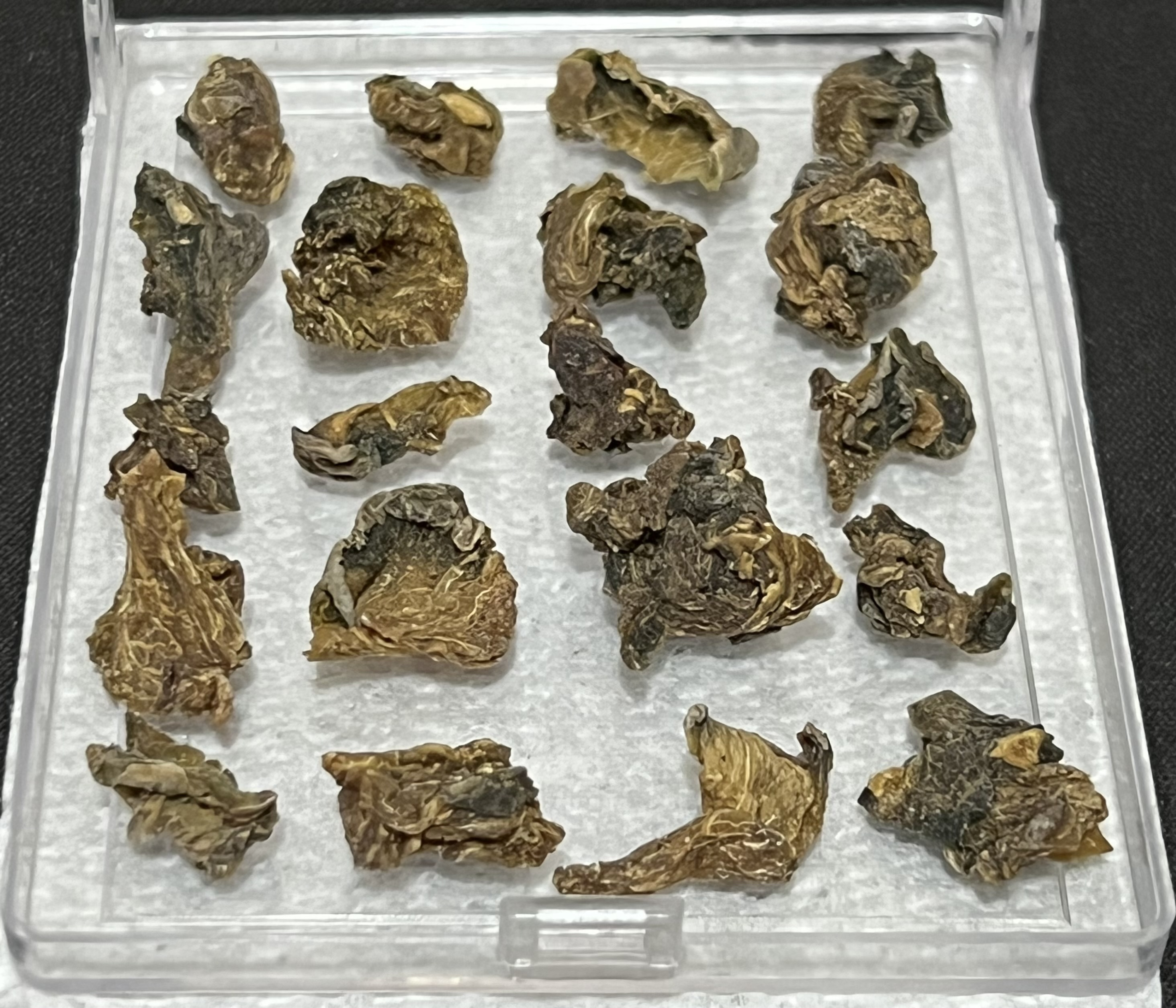
Dried peyote (Lophophora williamsii), containing around 5–6% mescaline by weight

When used for its psychoactive properties, common doses for pure mescaline range from roughly 200 to 400 mg. This translates to a dose of roughly 10 to 20 g of dried peyote buttons of average potency; however, potency varies considerably between samples, making it difficult to measure doses accurately without first extracting the mescaline. The concentration of mescaline is typically highest at the sides of the peyote button. The effects last about 10 to 12 hours. Peyote is reported to trigger rich visual or auditory effects (see synesthesia) and spiritual or philosophical insights.

In addition to psychoactive use, some Native American tribes use the plant in folk medicine. They employ peyote for varied ailments. Although uncommon, use of peyote and mescaline has been associated with poisoning. Peyote also contains other alkaloids such as hordenine.

=== Adverse effects ===
A study published in 2007 found no evidence of long-term cognitive problems related to peyote use in Native American Church ceremonies, but researchers stressed their results may not apply to those who use peyote in other contexts. A four-year large-scale study of Navajo who regularly ingested peyote found only one case where peyote was associated with a psychotic break in an otherwise healthy person; other psychotic episodes were attributed to peyote use in conjunction with pre-existing substance abuse or mental health problems. Later research found that those with pre-existing mental health issues are more likely to have adverse reactions to peyote. Peyote use does not appear to be associated with hallucinogen persisting perception disorder (a.k.a. "flashbacks") after religious use. Peyote also does not seem to be associated with physical dependence, but some users may experience psychological dependence.

Peyote can have strong emetic effects, and one death has been attributed to esophageal bleeding caused by vomiting after peyote ingestion in a Native American patient with a history of alcohol abuse. Peyote is also known to cause potentially serious variations in heart rate, blood pressure, breathing, and pupillary dilation.

Research into the Huichol natives of central-western Mexico, who have taken peyote regularly for an estimated 1,500 years or more, found no evidence of chromosome damage in either men or women.

According to a statement made by Gertrude Bonnin in 1916, a member of the Sioux tribe, the use of Peyote had been the direct cause of death among 25 Utes in a two year period.

== History ==
In 2005, researchers used radiocarbon dating and alkaloid analysis to study two specimens of peyote buttons found in archaeological digs from a site called Shumla Cave No. 5 on the Rio Grande in Texas. The results dated the specimens to between 3780 and 3660 BCE. Alkaloid extraction yielded approximately 2% of the alkaloids including mescaline in both samples. This indicates that native North Americans were likely to have used peyote since at least 5500 years ago. Specimens from a burial cave in west central Coahuila, Mexico have been similarly analyzed and dated to 810 to 1070 CE.

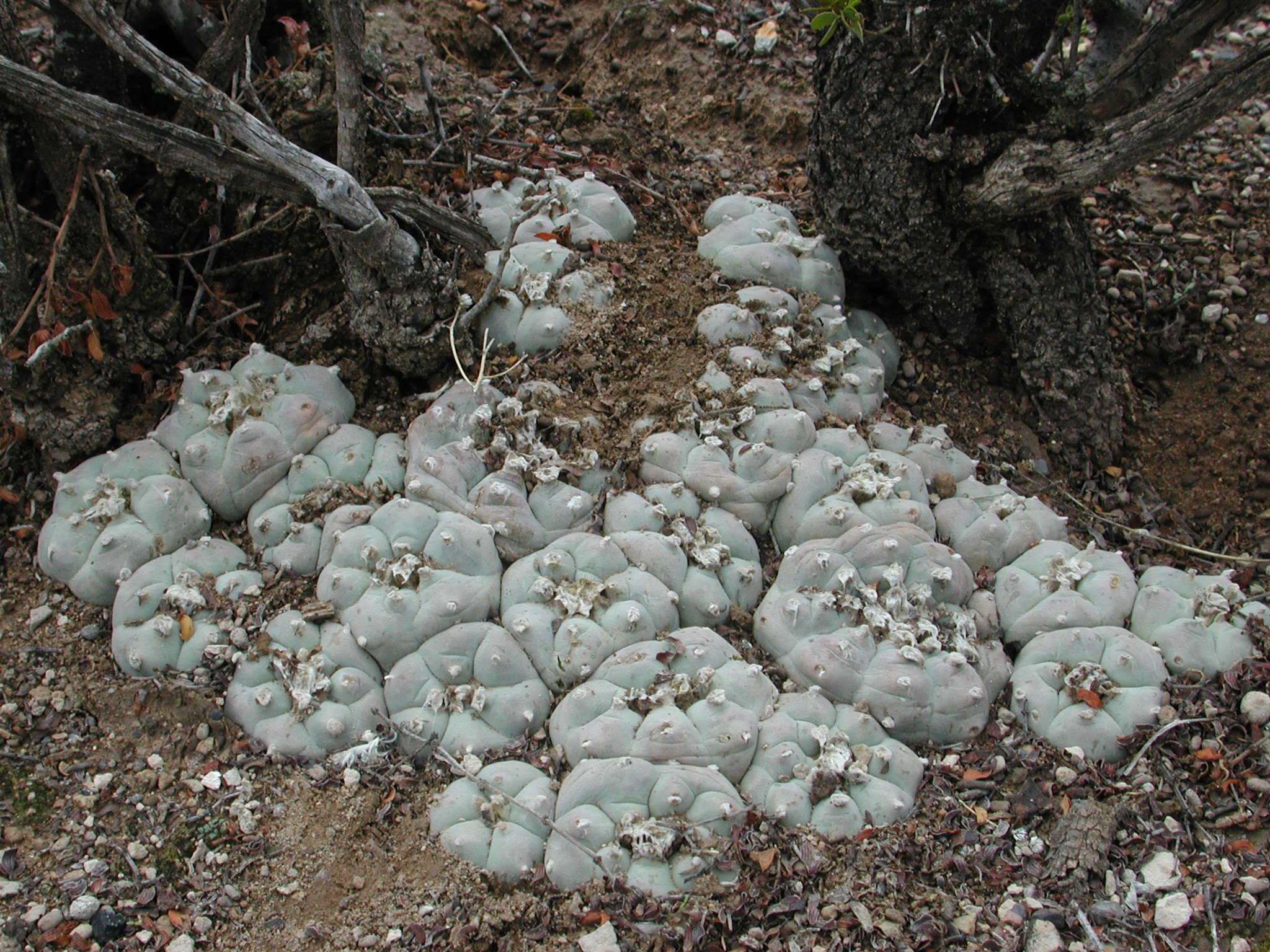
Peyote in Wirikuta, Mexico

From earliest recorded time, peyote has been used by indigenous peoples, such as the Huichol of northern Mexico and by various Native American tribes, native to or relocated to the Southern Plains states of present-day Oklahoma and Texas. Its usage was also recorded among various Southwestern Athabaskan-language tribal groups. The Tonkawa, the Mescalero, and Lipan Apache were the source or first practitioners of peyote religion in the regions north of present-day Mexico. They were also the principal group to introduce peyote to newly arrived migrants, such as the Comanche and Kiowa from the Northern Plains. The religious, ceremonial, and healing uses of peyote may date back over 2000 years.

Peyote was also carried well beyond the cactus's wild range. La Barre reported that northern Plains tribes relied largely on supplies shipped from Texas or purchased from Indigenous people nearer the source. Aberle and Stewart documented early-20th-century use at Pine Ridge and among the Yankton in South Dakota, and among the Santee at Fort Totten Reservation, North Dakota, by 1919.

Peyote was first described in the literature by Bernardino de Sahagún in 1560. It was first scientifically named as Peyotl zacatensis by Francisco Hernández (1517–1597), although the manuscript was not published until 1790. The plant, as Echinocactus williamsii, was subsequently botanically described and named by the French horticulturist Jean François Cels in 1842. Its naming is often erroneously attributed to German amateur botanist Joseph zu Salm-Reifferscheidt-Dyck in 1845. The French botanist Charles Antoine Lemaire also described and named the species as Echinocactus williamsianus in 1843. Since 1846, the official Mexican Pharmacopoeia recommended the use of peyote extract in "microdose" as a tonic for the heart. German botanist Paul Christoph Hennings named the species Anhalonium lewinii, in honor of Louis Lewin who provided him with his specimens, in 1888 as well. The species was renamed to its present-day accepted name Lophophora williamsii by American botanist John Merle Coulter in 1894.

John Raleigh Briggs (1851–1907) was the first to draw scientific attention of the Western scientific world to peyote. Louis Lewin described Anhalonium lewinii in 1888. British sexologist Havelock Ellis self experimented with it on Good Friday 1896, publishing details in 1898. Arthur Heffter conducted self experiments on its effects in 1897. Similarly, Norwegian ethnographer Carl Sofus Lumholtz studied and wrote about the use of peyote among the Indians of Mexico. Lumholtz also reported that, lacking other intoxicants, Texas Rangers captured by Union forces during the American Civil War soaked peyote buttons in water and became "intoxicated with the liquid".

Under the auspices of what came to be known as the Native American Church, in the 19th century, American Indians in more widespread regions to the north began to use peyote in religious practices, as part of a revival of native spirituality. Its members refer to peyote as "the sacred medicine", and use it to combat spiritual, physical, and other social ills. Concerned about the drug's psychoactive effects, between the 1880s and 1930s, U.S. authorities attempted to ban Native American religious rituals involving peyote, including the Ghost Dance. Today the Native American Church is one among several religious organizations to use peyote as part of its religious practice. Some users say the drug connects them to God.

Traditional Navajo belief or ceremonial practice did not mention the use of peyote before its introduction by the neighboring Utes. The Navajo Nation now has the most members of the Native American Church.

== Society and culture ==
=== Cultural significance ===
==== Wixarika (Huichol) culture ====
The Wixarika religion consists of four principal deities: Corn, Kayumari (Blue Deer), Hikuri (Peyote), and the Eagle, all descended from their Sun God. Schaefer has interpreted this to mean that peyote is the soul of their religious culture and a visionary sacrament that opens a pathway to the other deities.

Huichol art

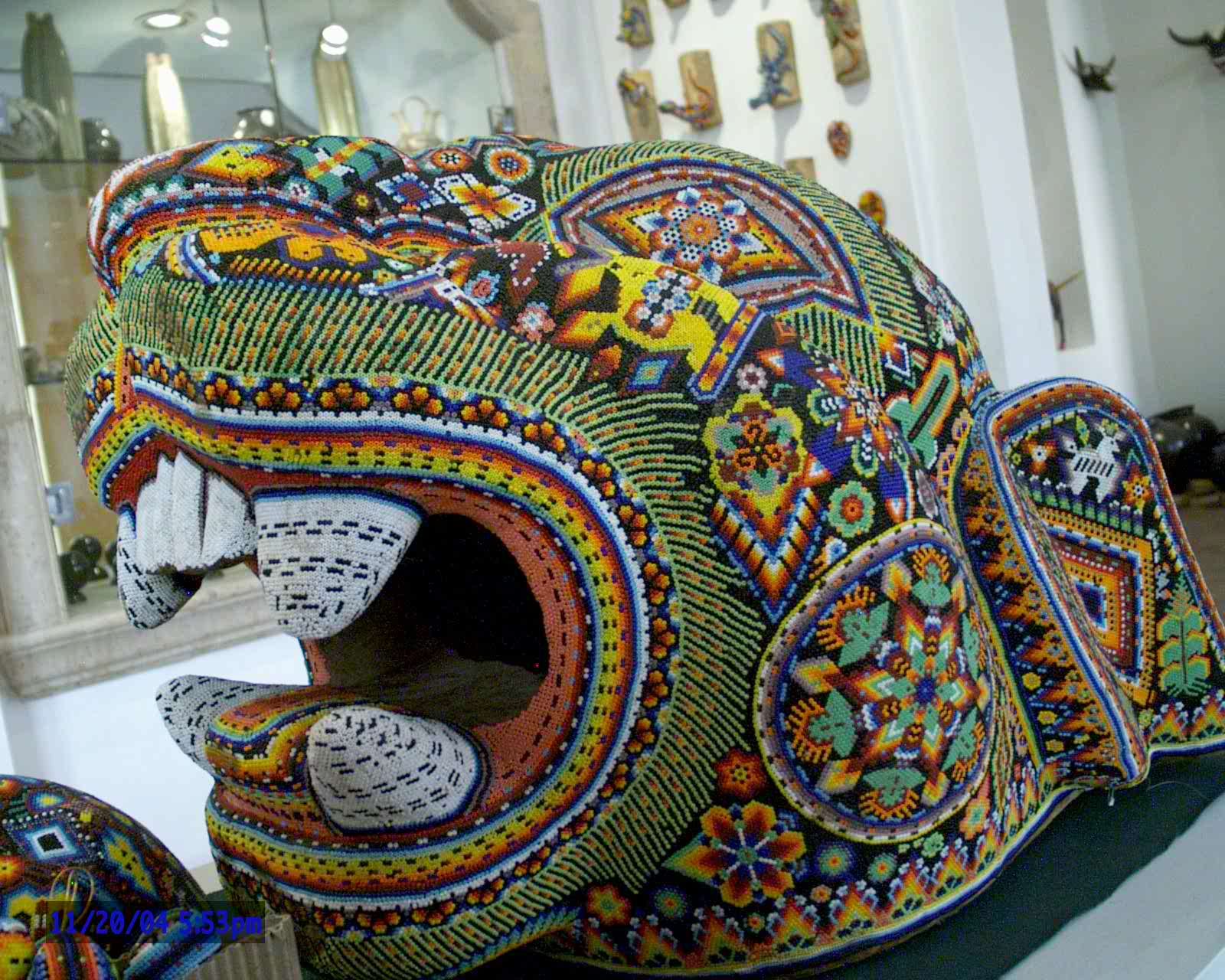

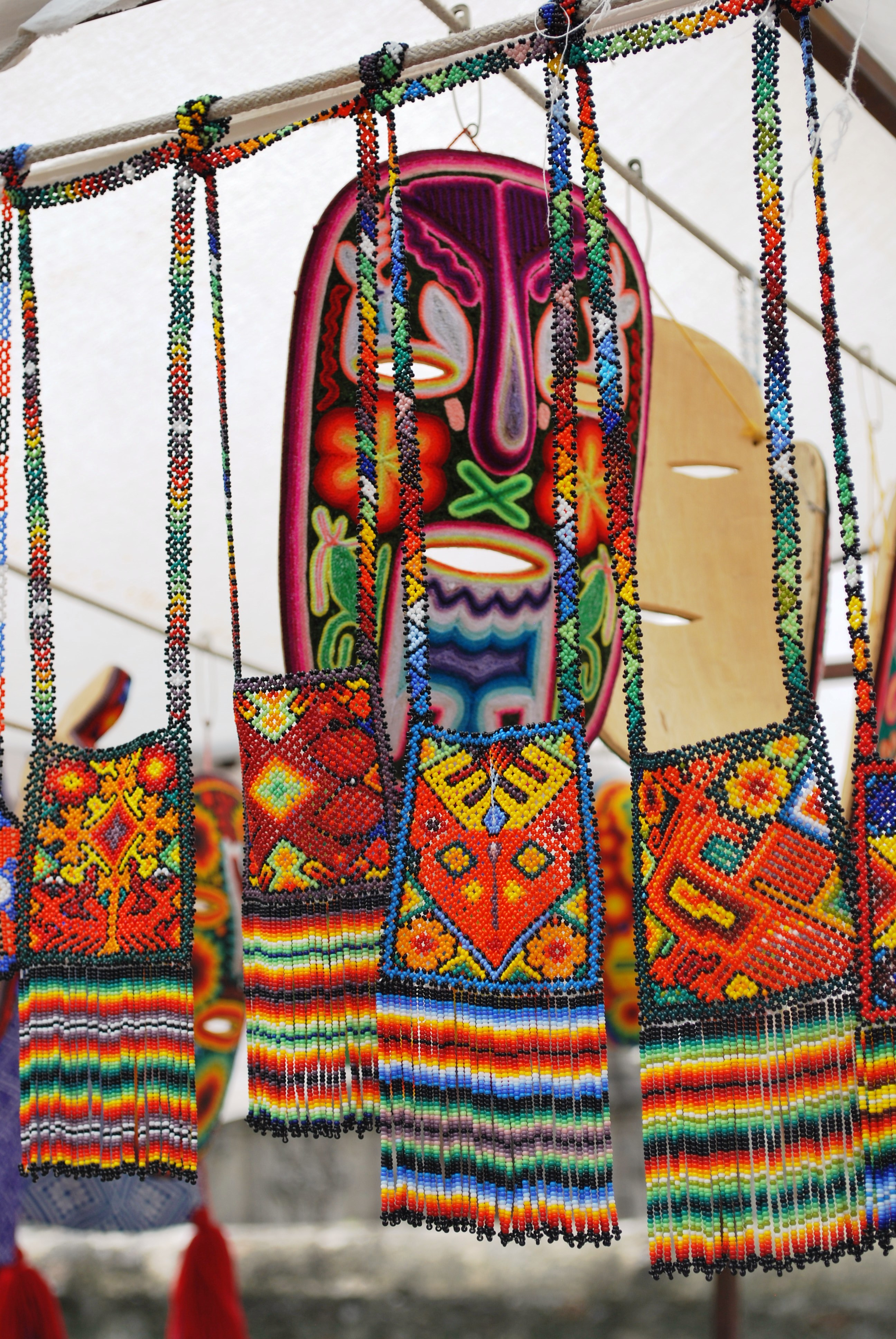

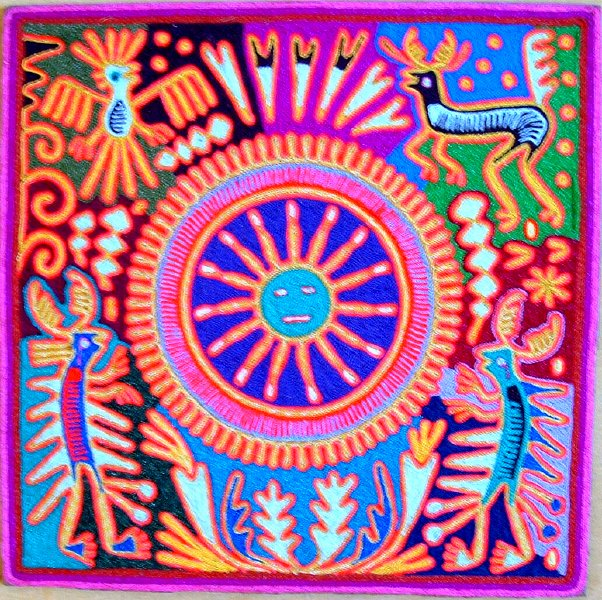

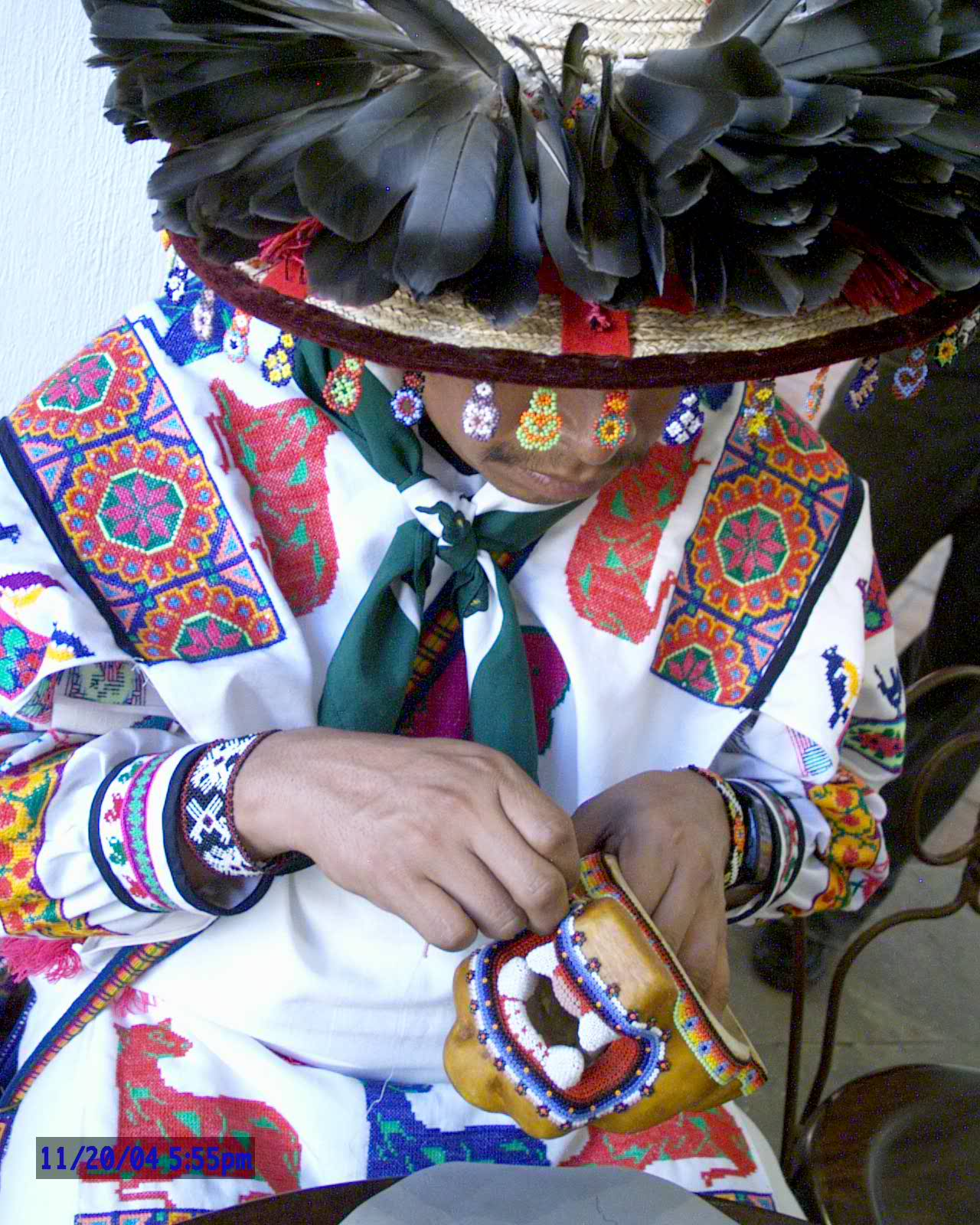

=== Religion ===
==== Native American Church ====
Peyote is considered sacramental and sacred in the Native American Church, also known as Peyotism. It is used in rituals for "a closer understanding of the spiritual world" and to commune with God and the spirits (including the deceased) in order to receive spiritual power, guidance, reproof, and healing. To many followers, peyote itself is personified as "Peyote Spirit", considered to be either God's equivalent for the Indians to Jesus for mainstream Christians, or Jesus himself.

Peyote is consumed during an all-night healing ceremony inside a hogan, a traditional Navajo building, or a tipi. The ritual starts around 8 P.M Saturday, and includes prayer, singing, sacramental eating of peyote, water rites, and contemplation. It concludes with a communion breakfast on Sunday morning.

==== Native American Church of New York ====
Peyote was used as a sacrament by the Native American Church of New York, which was founded by Alan Birnbaum and operated in New York City from 1976 to 1979. It is said to have had 1,000 followers in 1979. Despite its name, the Native American Church of New York was not actually Native American and had few or no Native American members. The church sued for the legal right to use peyote in Native American Church of New York v. United States in 1979, but largely lost the case. Subsequently, the church renamed itself to the Temple of the True Inner Light and turned to using the still-legal designer psychedelic dipropyltryptamine (DPT) as its sacrament.

=== Legality ===
==== Canada ====
Mescaline is listed as a Schedule III controlled substance under the Canadian Controlled Drugs and Substances Act, but peyote is specifically exempt. Possession and use of peyote plants is legal.

==== United States ====
Non-drug uses of peyote in religious ceremonies by the Native American Church and its members is exempt from registration. This law has been codified as a statute in the American Indian Religious Freedom Act of 1978, and made part of the common law in Peyote Way Church of God, Inc. v. Thornburgh, (5th Cir. 1991); it is also in administrative law at the 21 CFR 1307.31 which states for "Special Exempt Persons":

Section 1307.31 Native American Church. The listing of peyote as a controlled substance in Schedule I does not apply to the nondrug use of peyote in bona fide religious ceremonies of the Native American Church, and members of the Native American Church so using peyote are exempt from registration. Any person who manufactures peyote for or distributes peyote to the Native American Church, however, is required to obtain registration annually and to comply with all other requirements of law.

U.S. v. Boyll, 774 F.Supp. 1333 (D.N.M. 1991) addresses this racial issue specifically and concludes:

For the reasons set out in this Memorandum Opinion and Order, the Court holds that, pursuant to 21 C.F.R. § 1307.31 (1990), the classification of peyote as a Schedule I controlled substance, see 21 U.S.C. § 812(c), Schedule I(c)(12), does not apply to the importation, possession or use of peyote for 'bona fide' ceremonial use by members of the Native American Church, regardless of race.

Following the passage of the American Indian Religious Freedom Act Amendments of 1994, United States federal law (and many state laws) protects the harvest, possession, consumption and cultivation of peyote as part of "bona fide religious ceremonies" the federal statute is the American Indian Religious Freedom Act, codified at 42 U.S.C. § 1996a, "Traditional Indian religious use of the peyote sacrament", exempting only use by Native American persons. US v. Boyll expanded permitted use to all persons engaged in traditional Indian religious use, regardless of race. All US states with the exception of Idaho, Utah, and Texas allow usage by non-native, non-enrolled persons in the context of ceremonies of the Native American Church. Some states such as Arizona additionally exempt any general bona fide religious activity or spiritual intent. US jurisdictions enacted these specific statutory exemptions in reaction to the US Supreme Court's decision in Employment Division v. Smith, 494 U.S. 872 (1990), which held that laws prohibiting the use of peyote that do not specifically exempt religious use nevertheless do not violate the Free Exercise Clause of the First Amendment. Though use in Native American Church ceremonies or traditional Indian religious use, regardless of race, is legal under US federal law and additional uses are legal under some state laws, peyote is listed by the United States DEA as a Schedule I controlled substance.

The US military prohibits inductees from enlistment for prior drug usage; however, past usage of peyote is permissible if found to be used in accordance with Native American cultural practices.

In 2019, after a campaign by Decriminalize Nature, peyote was decriminalized in the city of Oakland, along with other naturally derived psychedelics.

== See also ==
- Ayahuasca
- Carlos Castaneda – an author of books involving his experiences with peyote.
- Convention on Psychotropic Substances: Psychedelic plants and fungi
- Echinopsis lageniformis
- Lophophora
- Psychedelic experience
- Peyote song
- R. Gordon Wasson
- Reuben Snake
