= Peyophorine =

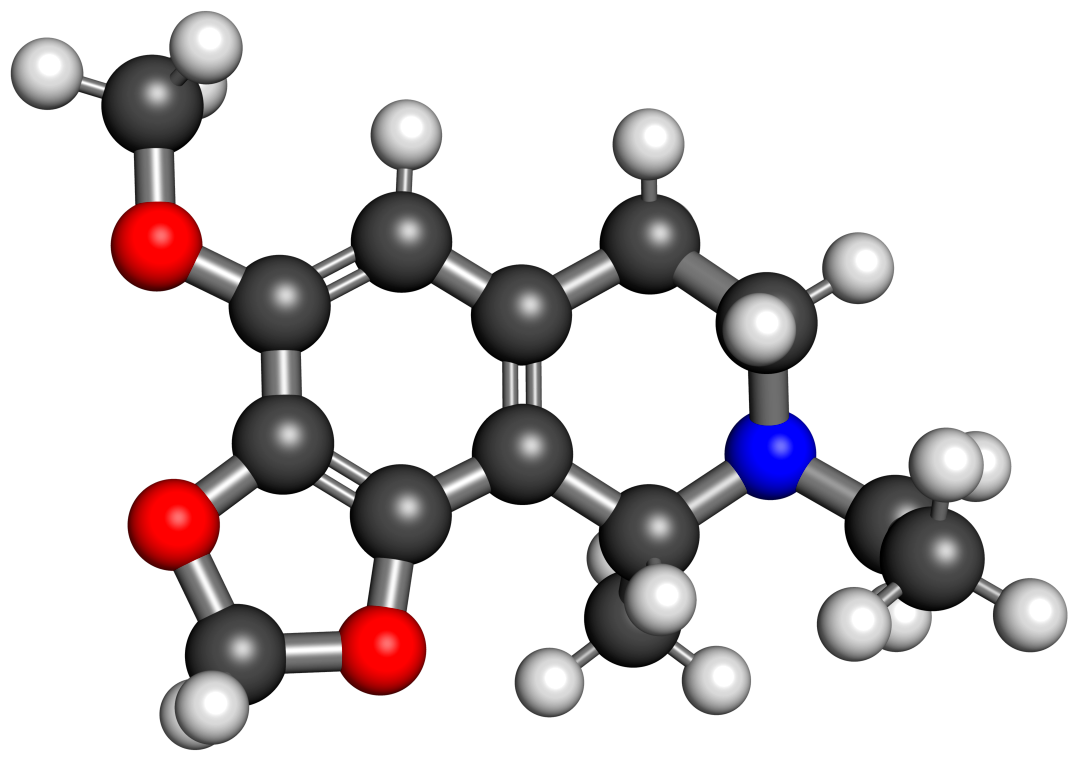

Clinical data
- Other names: N-Ethylanhalonine; 2-Ethyl-6-methoxy-1-methyl-7,8-methylenedioxy-1,2,3,4-tetrahydroisoquinoline; 2-Ethyl-6-methoxy-1-methyl-7,8-methylenedioxy-THIQ
- ATC code: None

Identifiers
- IUPAC name: 8-ethyl-4-methoxy-9-methyl-7,9-dihydro-6H-[1,3]dioxolo[4,5-h]isoquinoline
- CAS Number: 22030-12-2
- PubChem CID: 162875832

Chemical and physical data
- Formula: C_{14}H_{19}NO_{3}
- Molar mass: 249.310 g·mol^{−1}
- 3D model (JSmol): Interactive image
- SMILES: CCN1CCC2=CC(=C3C(=C2C1C)OCO3)OC
- InChI: InChI=1S/C14H19NO3/c1-4-15-6-5-10-7-11(16-3)13-14(18-8-17-13)12(10)9(15)2/h7,9H,4-6,8H2,1-3H3; Key:QJJGMTYVMOHCEO-UHFFFAOYSA-N

Peyophorine, also known as N-ethylanhalonine, is a minor tetrahydroisoquinoline alkaloid found in peyote (Lophophora williamsii). It was first described by 1968.

== See also ==
- Substituted tetrahydroisoquinoline
- Lophophorine (N-methylanhalonine)
- Anhalonine
