= Anhalonine =

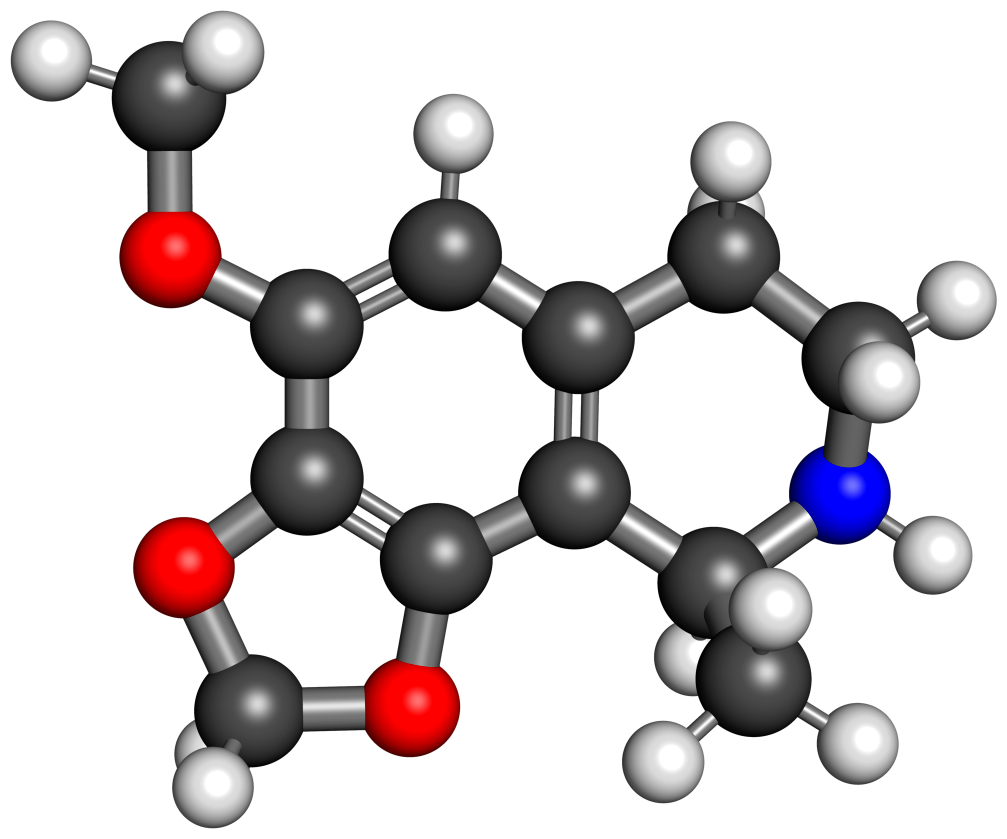

Clinical data
- Other names: 1-Methyl-6-methoxy-7,8-methylenedioxy-1,2,3,4-tetrahydroisoquinoline; 1-Methyl-6-methoxy-7,8-methylenedioxy-THIQ
- ATC code: None

Identifiers
- IUPAC name: 4-methoxy-9-methyl-6,7,8,9-tetrahydro-[1,3]dioxolo[4,5-h]isoquinoline
- CAS Number: 519-04-0
- PubChem CID: 520752
- ChemSpider: 454230
- UNII: E29105F32F
- CompTox Dashboard (EPA): DTXSID50966223

Chemical and physical data
- Formula: C_{12}H_{15}NO_{3}
- Molar mass: 221.256 g·mol^{−1}
- 3D model (JSmol): Interactive image
- SMILES: CC1C2=C3C(=C(C=C2CCN1)OC)OCO3
- InChI: InChI=1S/C12H15NO3/c1-7-10-8(3-4-13-7)5-9(14-2)11-12(10)16-6-15-11/h5,7,13H,3-4,6H2,1-2H3; Key:YEGBVDVRKMCCON-UHFFFAOYSA-N

Anhalonine, also known as 1-methyl-6-methoxy-7,8-methylenedioxy-1,2,3,4-tetrahydroisoquinoline, is a tetrahydroisoquinoline alkaloid found in Lophophora williamsii (peyote) and many other cactus species. Peyote contains 3% anhalonine. The drug is known to be pharmacologically active and is said to be similar in its activity to anhalonidine. Arthur Heffter tried anhalonine via self-experimentation at an oral dose of 100 mg and found that it was inactive aside from mild sleepiness. Similarly, Prentiss and Morgan (P&M) tried pure anhalonine at doses of up to 200 mg without any effects. Anhalonine was isolated from peyote by Louis Lewin in 1888 and was bioassayed by Heffter with his report published in 1898. P&M's report was published in 1896.

== See also ==
- Substituted tetrahydroisoquinoline
- Lophophorine
- Peyophorine
- Lophophine
