= Lophophorine =

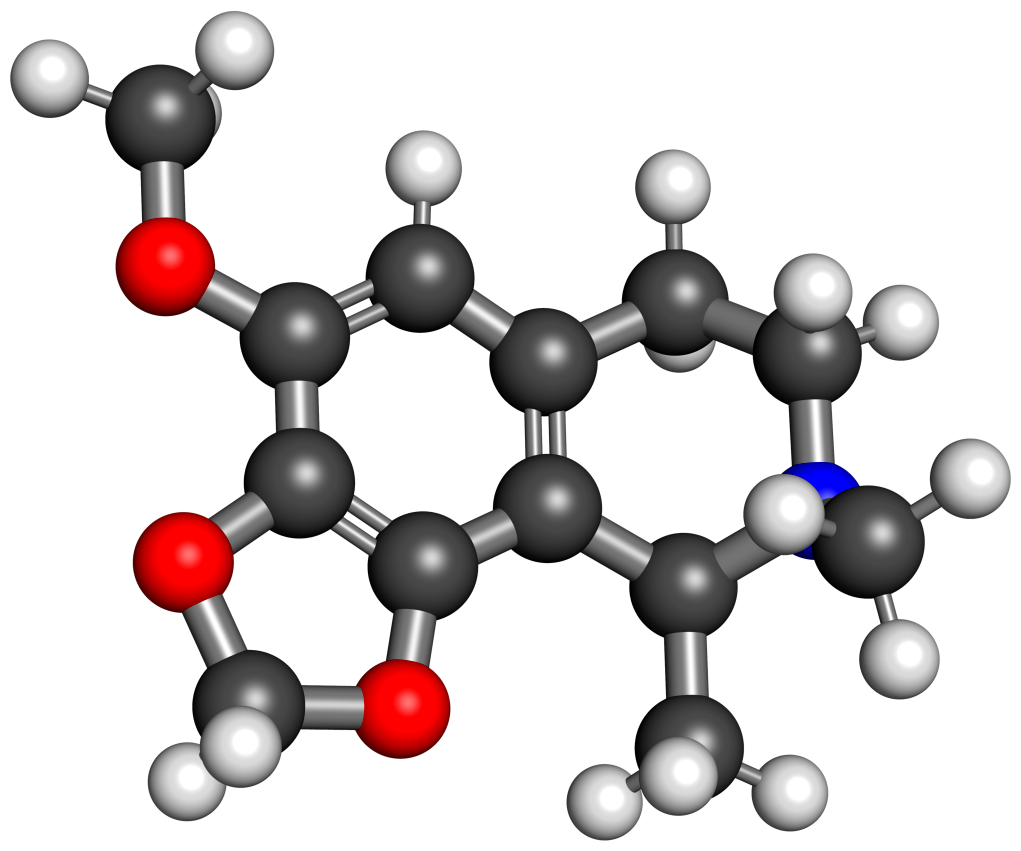

Clinical data
- Other names: N-Methylanhalonine; 6-Methoxy-1,2-dimethyl-7,8-methylenedioxy-1,2,3,4-tetrahydroisoquinoline; 6-Methoxy-1,2-dimethyl-7,8-methylenedioxy-THIQ
- Routes of administration: Oral
- ATC code: None

Identifiers
- IUPAC name: 4-methoxy-8,9-dimethyl-7,9-dihydro-6H-[1,3]dioxolo[4,5-h]isoquinoline
- CAS Number: 17627-78-0
- PubChem CID: 28654
- ChemSpider: 26651
- UNII: UYZ46JKJ8V
- KEGG: C09573
- ChEBI: CHEBI:6536
- CompTox Dashboard (EPA): DTXSID70938780

Chemical and physical data
- Formula: C_{13}H_{17}NO_{3}
- Molar mass: 235.283 g·mol^{−1}
- 3D model (JSmol): Interactive image
- SMILES: CC1C2=C3C(=C(C=C2CCN1C)OC)OCO3
- InChI: InChI=1S/C13H17NO3/c1-8-11-9(4-5-14(8)2)6-10(15-3)12-13(11)17-7-16-12/h6,8H,4-5,7H2,1-3H3; Key:PNFBXEKHLUDPIM-UHFFFAOYSA-N

Lophophorine, also known as N-methylanhalonine, is a tetrahydroisoquinoline alkaloid made by various cacti in the Lophophora family. Arthur Heffter tried lophophorine at a dose of 20 mg and found that it produced vasodilation, an immediate headache, and a warm flushed feeling, effects which dissipated within an hour. It has also been said to produce nausea in humans. Conversely, it did not produce hallucinogenic effects. Lophophorine is described as highly toxic and produces strychnine-like convulsions in animals. It was first described in the scientific literature by Heffter by 1898.

== See also ==
- Substituted tetrahydroisoquinoline
- Peyophorine (N-ethylanhalonine)
- Anhalonine
