= List of hallucinogen scales =

This is a list of hallucinogen scales, or psychometric scales used to assess the subjective effects of hallucinogens, such as psychedelics like LSD, psilocybin, mescaline, and dimethyltryptamine (DMT), as well as other hallucinogens like ketamine and salvia. They include:

- Acceptance/Avoidance-Promoting Experiences Questionnaire (APEQ)
- Addiction Research Center Inventory (ARCI)
- After the Spiritual Experience Questionnaire (ASEQ)
- Altered States of Consciousness Rating Scale (ASC)
  - Versions: APZ, OAV, BETA, 5D-ASC, 11-ASC, 3D-ASCr
- Challenging Experience Questionnaire (CEQ)
- Clinician-Administered Dissociative States Scale (CADSS)
- Drug Effects Questionnaire (DEQ)
- Ego Dissolution Inventory (EDI)
- Emotional Breakthrough Inventory (EBI)
- Hallucinogen Rating Scale (HRS)
- Higher Consciousness Scale (HC-18)
- Hood Mysticism Scale (HMS; M-scale)
- Mystical Experience Questionnaire (MEQ)
- Mystical Orientation Scale (MOS)
- Near-Death Experience Questionnaire (NDE)
- Persisting Effects Questionnaire (PEQ)
- Phenomenology of Consciousness Inventory (PCI)
- Psychedelic Experience Scale (PES)
- Psychological Insight Questionnaire (PIQ)
- Psychological Insight Scale (PIS)
- Psychotomimetic States Inventory (PSI)
- Short Index of Mystical Orientation (SIMO)
- Shulgin Rating Scale (SRS)
- States of Consciousness Questionnaire (SOCQ)
- Swiss Psychedelic Side Effects Inventory (SPSI)
- Watts Connectedness Scale (WCS)
- Wave test (WAVE)

Some of these scales are broad/general scales, while others are more narrow and focused on specific aspects of experiences.

Among the most widely used scales include the 5D-ASC, 11-ASC, HRS, MEQ, and SOCQ.

== See also ==
- Psychonautics
- Psychedelic experience
- Subjective Effect Index (SEI)
- Trip report
