= Isobubbialine =

Chemical compound

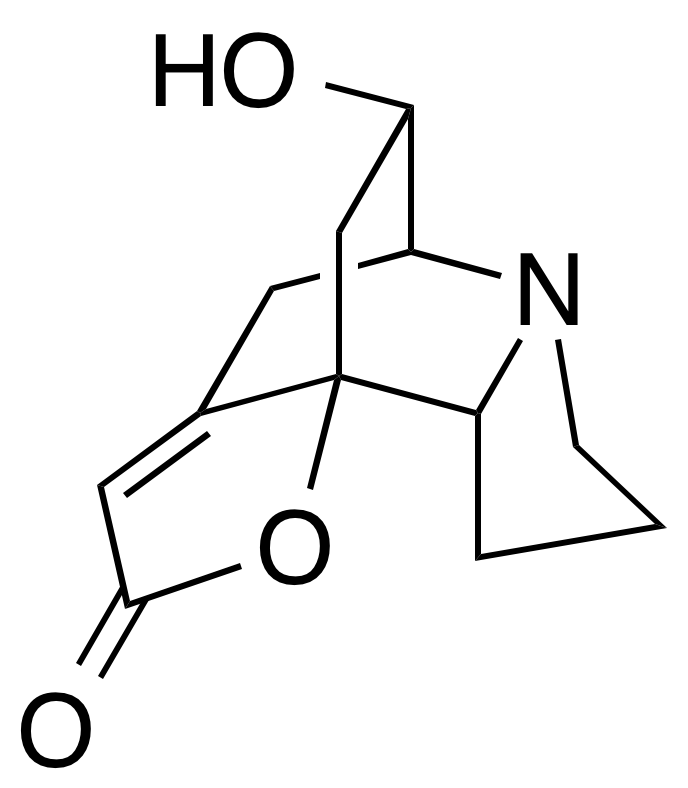

Identifiers
- IUPAC name: (1R,2R,7S,14S)-14-hydroxy-12-oxa-6-azatetracyclo[5.5.2.0^{1,9}.0^{2,6}]tetradec-9-en-11-one
- CAS Number: 182209-97-8
- PubChem CID: 102003051
- CompTox Dashboard (EPA): DTXSID501336479

Chemical and physical data
- Formula: C_{12}H_{15}NO_{3}
- Molar mass: 221.256 g·mol^{−1}
- 3D model (JSmol): Interactive image
- SMILES: C1C[C@@H]2[C@@]34C[C@@H]([C@@H](N2C1)CC3=CC(=O)O4)O
- InChI: InChI=1S/C12H15NO3/c14-9-6-12-7(5-11(15)16-12)4-8(9)13-3-1-2-10(12)13/h5,8-10,14H,1-4,6H2/t8-,9-,10+,12+/m0/s1; Key:LXHGRIAYJAHNHR-UXCLJVHYSA-N

Isobubbialine is a chemical compound first found in Phyllanthus niruri. It is related to bubbialine.
