= Altered States of Consciousness Rating Scales =

The Altered States of Consciousness Rating Scales (ASC) are psychometric scales used in research on altered states of consciousness such as those induced by hallucinogenic drugs like psychedelics. Forms include the APZ, OAV (3D-ASC), 5D-ASC, 11-ASC, and 3D-ASCr.

== Forms ==
The ASC scale has several different forms, including:

- Abnorme / Aussergewöhnliche Psychische Zustände (APZ; Abnormal Mental States) – the original three-dimensional version (1975)
- OAV (Ozeanische Selbstentgrenzung (OSE), Angstvolle Ich-Auflösung (AIA), Visionäre Umstrukturierung (VUS)—translated to Oceanic Boundlessness, Dread of Ego Dissolution, Visionary Restructuralization; 3D-ASC) – the revised three-dimensional version (1989)
- Bewüsstseinstrübung und Akustische Halluzinationen (BETA) – supplemental scale with two additional dimensions—auditory alterations (AUA) and vigilance reduction (VIR) (undated)
- 5D-ASC – expanded five-dimensional version and combination of OAV and BETA (1999)
- 11-ASC – revised 11-factor version (2010)
- 3D-ASCr – revised three-dimensional version (2025)

The 5D-ASC is the most widely used, followed by the 11-ASC version, based on literature citation counts in 2022.

== History ==
The original APZ was first described by Adolf Dittrich in 1975 and was among the earliest scales for assessing hallucinogen effects. The OAV (3D-ASC) was developed and described by I. Bodmer in 1989. BETA was later developed by Dittrich and colleagues and then the OAV and BETA were combined by them to create the 5D-ASC in 1999. The 11-ASC was described by Franz X. Vollenweider and colleagues in 2010. The 3D-ASCr scale was described by Matthias Liechti and colleagues in 2025.

== See also ==
- List of hallucinogen scales
