= Mark A. Geyer =

American neuroscientist

Mark A. Geyer is an American neuroscientist focusing on the development of parallel behavioral paradigms in animals and humans for use in psychiatric drug discovery. He is the Distinguished Professor Emeritus of Psychiatry and Neurosciences at the University of California, San Diego, and an Elected Fellow of the American Association for the Advancement of Science.

He is the director of the Neuropsychopharmacology Unit of the Veterans Administration Mental Illness Research, Clinical, and Education Center, and the Associate Chief of Psychophysiology at the VA Center of Excellence for Stress and Mental Health.
