= DMT: The Spirit Molecule =

- Film poster
- Directed by: Mitch Schultz
- Based on: 2001 book DMT: The Spirit Molecule: A Doctor's Revolutionary Research into the Biology of Near-Death and Mystical Experiences by Rick Strassman
- Narrated by: Joe Rogan
- Cinematography: Matt Ehling
- Music by: David Schommer
- Production companies: Spectral Alchemy; Synthetic Pictures
- Distributed by: Gravitas Ventures
- Release dates: 15 October 2010 (San Francisco Doc Fest); 3 May 2012
- Running time: 75 minutes
- Country: United States
- Language: English

DMT: The Spirit Molecule is a 2010 documentary film based on a book of the same name by Rick Strassman. Directed by Mitch Schultz and starring Joe Rogan as narrator, the documentary deals primarily with the psychedelic and entheogenic drug dimethyltryptamine (DMT) through the lens of interviews with those who have used the drug, either as part of Strassman's scientific studies, or in combination with MAOIs (as ayahuasca). In 2013, Adam Winstock, working off of data in the Global Drug Survey, hypothesized that the documentary may have led to increased popularity of DMT. In July 2018, Variety reported that the documentary was one of the most streamed on Netflix.

== See also ==
- List of psychedelic documentaries
