= Arthur Heffter =

German pharmacologist and chemist

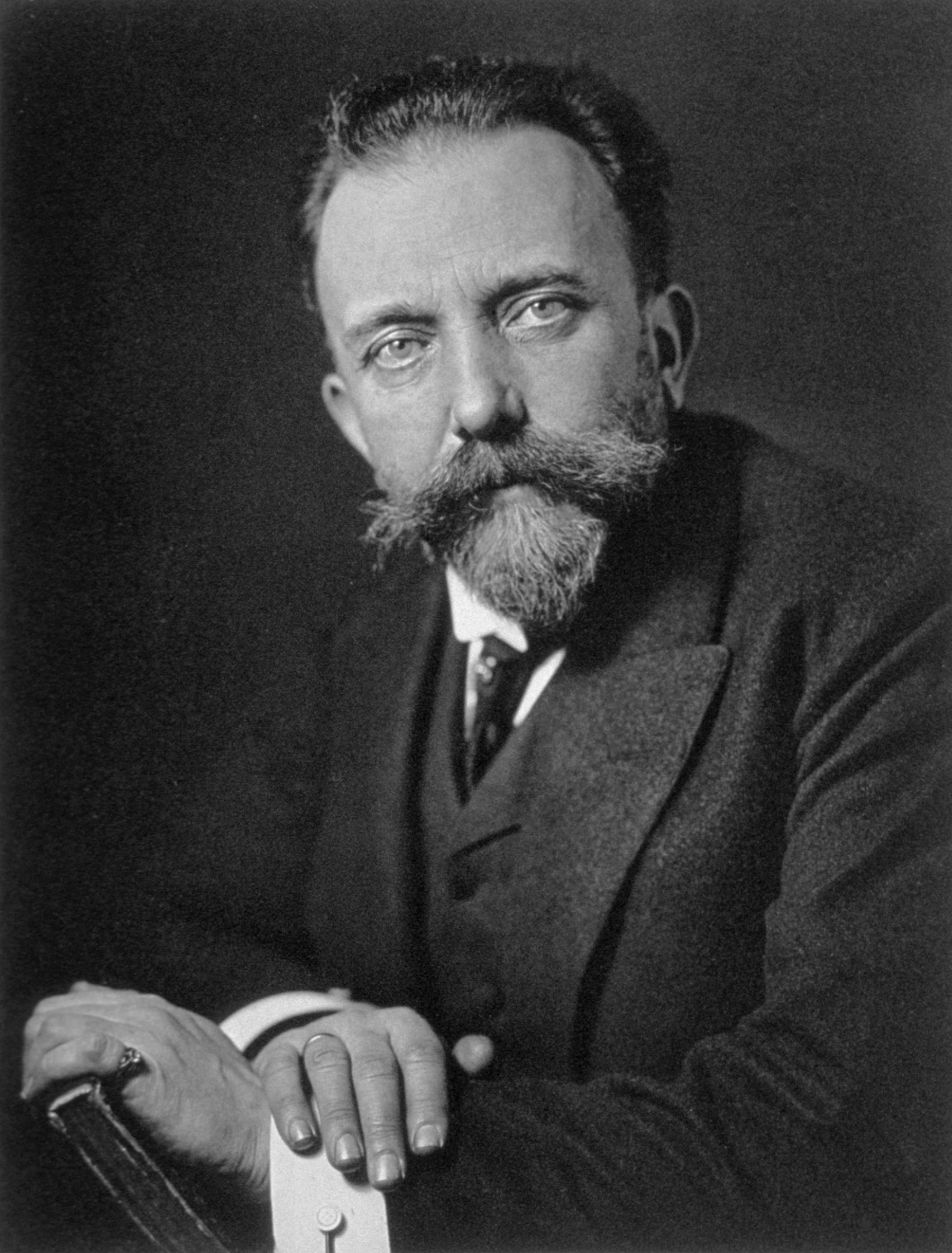
Arthur Carl Wilhelm Heffter

Arthur Carl Wilhelm Heffter (15 June 1859, in Leipzig – 8 February 1925, in Berlin) was a German pharmacologist and chemist. He was the first chairman of the German Society of Pharmacologists, and was largely responsible for the first Handbook of Experimental Pharmacology. He isolated mescaline from the peyote cactus in 1897, the first such isolation of a naturally occurring psychedelic substance in pure form. In addition, he conducted experiments on its effects by comparing the effects of peyote and mescaline on himself.

== Biography ==
Arthur Heffter was born on 15 June 1859 in Leipzig, Germany. He studied natural sciences and later medicine, earning a doctorate in chemistry in 1883 under chemist Wilhelm Limpricht. He spent two years at the University of Rostock in the Institute for Pharmacology and Physiological Chemistry before becoming an assistant to Oswald Schmiedeberg at the University of Strasbourg, one of the leading figures in early pharmacology. Heffter held academic positions at several institutions, including the University of Leipzig and the University of Bern in Switzerland, where he contributed to experimental pharmacology and medical education. In Berlin, he was appointed director of the Pharmacological Institute and served in multiple advisory roles related to public health and pharmaceutical policy.

His scientific work included studies on the excretion of toxic metals such as mercury and arsenic, investigations into cardiac glycosides including digitalis, and the development of analytical methods for isolating active compounds from medicinal plants. Heffter was also active in pharmaceutical regulation. He served on the Prussian Pharmacopoeia Commission and the Imperial Health Office, where he helped shape early efforts at drug standardization and evaluation. Heffter’s early work isolating and studying mescaline preceded subsequent research into structurally related compounds like psilocybin, which also interact with serotonergic systems. His regulatory work, along with his scientific contributions, positioned him as an influential figure in the development of modern pharmacology in Germany.

Heffter contributed to the early volumes of the Handbook of Experimental Pharmacology, a reference work that has been cited in medical literature. The Heffter Research Institute, named after him, supports research into the therapeutic use of psychedelics. He also published monographs on subjects such as lead poisoning in painters and approaches to drug discovery, reflecting his involvement in public health and pharmaceutical research (see below).

== Works ==
- Die chronische Bleivergiftung im Maler-Gewerbe. [S.l.] 1903 Digital edition by the University and State Library Düsseldorf.
- Die Auffindung von Arzneimitteln. Hirschwald, Berlin 1914 Digital edition by the University and State Library Düsseldorf.

== See also ==
- Heffter Research Institute
- List of psychedelic chemists
