= Rick Strassman =

American drug researcher

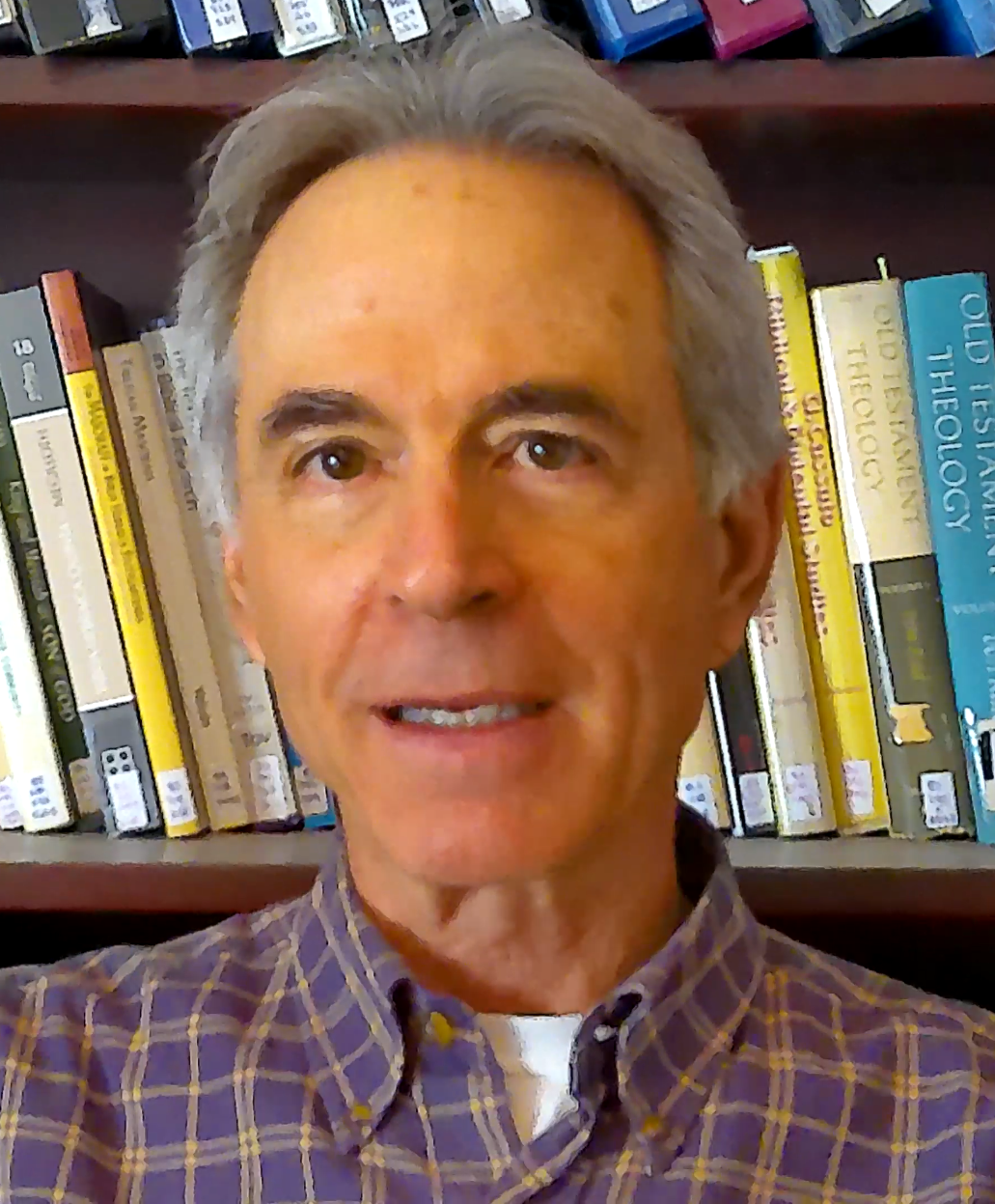
- Born: February 8, 1952; Los Angeles, California
- Education: Pomona College; Stanford University (B.S.); Albert Einstein College of Medicine (M.D.)
- Known for: DMT: The Spirit Molecule
- Scientific career
- Fields: Psychiatry; Psychedelics

Rick Strassman is an American clinical associate professor of psychiatry at the University of New Mexico School of Medicine. He has held a fellowship in clinical psychopharmacology research at the University of California San Diego and was Professor of Psychiatry for eleven years at the University of New Mexico. After 20 years of intermission, Strassman was the first person in the United States to undertake human research with psychedelic, hallucinogenic, or entheogenic substances with his research on dimethyltryptamine, also known as DMT. He is also the author of DMT: The Spirit Molecule, which summarizes his academic research into DMT and other experimental studies of it, and includes his own reflections and conclusions based on this research.

== Early life and education ==
Strassman was born in Los Angeles, on February 8, 1952, to a Conservative Jewish family. He graduated from Ulysses S. Grant High School in Van Nuys, California in 1969.

Strassman studied zoology at Pomona College in Claremont, California for two years before transferring to Stanford University, where he graduated with departmental honors in biological sciences in 1973. He continued laboratory research at Stanford before attending Albert Einstein College of Medicine of Yeshiva University in New York, where he graduated with an M.D. with departmental honors, specializing in psychiatry. He began his general psychiatry residency at the University of California, Davis, where he received the Sandoz Award for outstanding graduating resident in 1981.

From 1982 to 1983, Strassman trained as a fellow in clinical psychopharmacology research at the University of California, San Diego. He then served on the clinical faculty in the psychiatry department at UC Davis Medical Center, before becoming an assistant professor in the psychiatry department at the University of New Mexico School of Medicine in Albuquerque in 1984.

At UNM, Strassman researched the function of the pineal gland. His research group documented the first known role of melatonin in humans. He became clinical associate professor of psychiatry in 1991.

Strassman has published over 40 peer-reviewed scientific articles on psychopharmacology, neurology, psychiatry, neuroendocrinology and neuropsychopharmacology.

== Developmental biology research ==
As an undergraduate at Stanford, working in the developmental biology laboratory of Norman K. Wessells, Strassman developed a new model for growing embryonic avian dorsal root ganglion neurons, suspended in a semi-solid agar matrix, thus allowing three-dimensional assessment of growing patterns. Using this model, he discovered a nonrandom pattern of growth of the leading edge of these cells.

== Melatonin research ==
Strassman's interest in the human biology of altered states of consciousness led him to study the pineal gland hormone melatonin in the 1980s, at which time there were suggestive data regarding its psychoactive effects. This research took place at the University of New Mexico's School of Medicine in Albuquerque, where he became a tenured associate professor of psychiatry. He first developed a model of all-night suppression of melatonin by all-night bright light. He then established a successful exogenous melatonin infusion protocol that replicated endogenous melatonin levels in the bright-light conditions. All-night bright-light suppression of melatonin suppressed the normal trough of body temperature seen between 3-4 a.m., the time of maximum melatonin levels. Exogenous infusion of melatonin, replicating endogenous levels in the bright-light condition (in which endogenous melatonin was suppressed) reestablished the normal core body temperature trough. But melatonin's psychoactive effects were only sedative, leading him to focus on DMT in his future work.

== Research into DMT ==
From 1990 to 1995, Strassman led a government-funded clinical research team at the University of New Mexico studying the effects of dimethyltryptamine, also known as DMT, on human subjects in experimental conditions. The research continued from his work on melatonin.

Strassman's studies between 1990 and 1995 aimed to experimentally investigate DMT's effects. DMT is a powerful psychedelic drug found in hundreds of plants and every mammal that has been studied. It is made primarily in mammalian brains as well as lung tissue and is related to serotonin and melatonin.

As a result of his research, Strassman came to call DMT the "spirit molecule" because its effects include many features of religious experience, such as visions, voices, disembodied consciousness, powerful emotions, novel insights, and feelings of overwhelming significance. During the project's five years, he administered approximately 400 doses of DMT to nearly 60 human volunteers. Strassman was the first in 20 years to legally administer psychedelics to people in the United States, and his research has widely been regarded as kicking off the "psychedelic renaissance", in which many psychedelic compounds have begun to be scientifically studied for the first time since the early 1970s.

Strassman characterized DMT's biological and psychological effects in his first set of dose-response studies, effects consistent with activation of central and/or peripheral serotonin receptors. His team published a companion article describing the psychological effects and preliminary results of a new rating scale, the Hallucinogen Rating Scale, or HRS. Researchers have widely accepted the HRS as a sensitive and specific measure of the psychological effects of a wide variety of psychoactive substances, with over 45 articles documenting its use as of mid-2015. A follow-up study demonstrated lack of tolerance of the psychological effects of repeated closely spaced doses of DMT, making it unique among classical psychedelics.

More than half of Strassman's volunteers reported profound encounters/interaction with nonhuman beings while in a dissociated state. Strassman has conjectured that when a person is approaching death or possibly when in a dream state, the body releases a relatively large amount of DMT, mediating some of the imagery survivors of near-death experiences report. But there are no data correlating endogenous DMT activity to non-drug-related altered states of consciousness. He also has theorized that the pineal gland may form DMT under certain conditions. In 2013 researchers first reported DMT in the pineal gland microdialysate of rodents.

Strassman has detailed his research in his book DMT: The Spirit Molecule, and co-produced a 2010 documentary film of the same name based on this book. He has also conducted similar research on psilocybin, a psychedelic alkaloid found in hallucinogenic mushrooms. In unpublished studies, he administered doses of up to 1.1 mg/kg, nearly three times the doses considered "psychedelic" in contemporary clinical research with this compound.

=== Religious models for integrating DMT experiences ===
Inspired by visions he had when he took LSD in the early 1970s, Strassman began studying Buddhism as a young man. He trained for 20 years in Zen Buddhism, received lay ordination in a Western Buddhist order, and led a meditation group of the order. But his work with DMT led him to feel Buddhist models may not be the most suitable way for us to explain and integrate the spiritual dimensions of the DMT experience:

I worked through various models' methods of understanding the DMT volunteers' experiences, and found them wanting. The Buddhist psychological model didn't comport with the data—the "more real than real" element of volunteers' experiences (Buddhism proposes these phenomena are all generated by the mind, rather than "real" observations of external reality); [this] did nothing to suggest a satisfactory evolutionary explanation for the presence of DMT in the human body.

Strassman suggests that DMT experiences may most closely resemble those found in the Hebrew Bible's model of prophecy:

The Hebrew Bible's model of prophecy is appealing because it comports well with the reports of the DMT volunteers. One's sense of self is maintained, there is an external free-standing independent-of-the-observer spiritual world. One relates to the content of the experience, rather than being dissolved into it.

Some of Strassman's experimental participants say that other entities can resemble creatures more like insects and aliens than anything in the Bible. As a result, Strassman wrote that these experiences of his experimental participants "also left me feeling confused and concerned about where the spirit molecule was leading us. It was at this point that I began to wonder if I was getting in over my head with this research." He has also hypothesized that endogenous DMT experiences could be the cause of alien abduction experiences.

== See also ==
- Andrew Gallimore
- Luis Eduardo Luna
- Terence McKenna
- Dennis McKenna
- Jeremy Narby
- David E. Nichols
- Jonathan Ott
- Benny Shanon
- DMT: The Spirit Molecule, a documentary based on Strassman's nonfiction book of the same name
- Hallucinogen Rating Scale (HRS)

== Bibliography ==
- DMT: The Spirit Molecule: A Doctor's Revolutionary Research into the Biology of Near-Death and Mystical Experiences. Park Street Press. 2001. ISBN 978-0-89281-927-0.
- Inner Paths to Outer Space: Journeys to Alien Worlds through Psychedelics and Other Spiritual Technologies. Park Street Press. 2008. ISBN 978-1-59477-224-5. With Slawek Wojtowicz, Luis Eduardo Luna, and Ede Frecska.
- DMT and the Soul of Prophecy: A New Science of Spiritual Revelation in the Hebrew Bible. Park Street Press. 2014. ISBN 1-59477-342-4.
- Joseph Levy Escapes Death. Regent Press. 2019. ISBN 978-1-58790-472-1.
- The Psychedelic Handbook: A Practical Guide to Psilocybin, LSD, Ketamine, MDMA, and Ayahuasca. Ulysses Press. 2022. ISBN 978-1-64604-381-1.
- My Altered States: A Doctor's Extraordinary Account of Trauma, Psychedelics, and Spiritual Growth. Park Street Press. 2024. ISBN 978-1-64411-979-2.
