= Substituted methoxyphenethylamine =

Class of chemical compounds

Mescaline (3,4,5-TMPEA), an example of a major methoxyphenethylamine.

MMDA, an example of a methylenedioxyphenethylamine.

Methoxyphenethylamines (MPEAs), as well as methoxyamphetamines (MAs) in the case of the amphetamine (α-methylphenethylamine) homologues, are substituted phenethylamines with one or more methoxy groups. In some cases, one or more of the methoxy groups may also be extended to form other alkoxy and related groups such as ethoxy or propoxy. Methoxyphenethylamines may have additional substitutions as well.

Many methoxyphenethylamines that have multiple methoxy groups in the 2- through 5-positions of the phenyl ring, for instance mescaline, 2C-B, TMA, DOM, and 25I-NBOMe, are serotonin 5-HT_{2A} receptor agonists and serotonergic psychedelics. Other methoxyphenethylamines, particularly monomethoxyamphetamines like para-methoxyamphetamine (PMA), are monoamine releasing agents of serotonin, norepinephrine, and/or dopamine, with stimulant and/or entactogen-related effects.

Compounds closely related to methoxyphenethylamines include methylenedioxyphenethylamines (MDxx) like MDA, MDMA, and MMDA, in which two adjacent methoxy groups are bridged, and FLY compounds like 2C-B-FLY, in which methoxy groups are cyclized into furan rings to create benzofuran ring systems.

Almost all known psychedelic phenethylamines are either methoxyphenethylamines or closely related compounds like MDxx or benzofurans. There are only a few known exceptions, such as fenfluramine, 4-methylamphetamine (4-MA), and lorcaserin, which can all reportedly produce psychedelic effects at high and supratherapeutic doses. This is in notable contrast to tryptamines such as dimethyltryptamine (DMT), which require no specific ring substitutions to be psychedelic.

== List of methoxyphenethylamines ==
=== Phenethylamines ===
- Monomethoxyphenethylamines (MPEAs) (e.g., 2-MPEA, 3-MPEA, 4-MPEA)
- Dimethoxyphenethylamines (DMPEAs) (e.g., 2,5-DMPEA (2C-H), 3,4-DMPEA, 3,5-DMPEA (DMPEA-6), 6-Br-DMPEA, MEPEA, macromerine)
  - 2Cs (4-substituted 2,5-DMPEAs) (e.g., 2C-B, 2C-C, 2C-D, 2C-E, 2C-I, 2C-T-2)
    - TWEETIOs (e.g., 2CB-2-EtO, 2CD-5-EtO, 2CT2-2-EtO, ASR-2001 (2CB-5PrO))
  - Scalines (4-substituted 3,5-DMPEAs) (e.g., 4-desoxymescaline (DESOXY; 4-Me-3,5-DMPEA))
  - Ψ-PEAs (4-substituted 2,6-DMPEAs) (e.g., Ψ-2C-T-4)
- Trimethoxyphenethylamines (TMPEAs) (e.g., 2,4,5-TMPEA (2C-O; TMPEA-2), mescaline (3,4,5-TMPEA; TMPEA-1), isomescaline (2,3,4-TMPEA; TMPEA-3), ψ-2C-O (2,4,6-TMPEA), 2,3,5-TMPEA (TMPEA-4), 2,3,6-TMPEA (TMPEA-5))
  - 2Cs (4-substituted 2,5-DMPEAs) (e.g., 2C-O, 2C-O-4, 2C-O-22)
  - Scalines (4-substituted 3,5-DMPEAs) (e.g., mescaline, escaline, proscaline, allylescaline, methallylescaline)
  - Ψ-PEAs (4-substituted 2,6-DMPEAs) (e.g., Ψ-2C-O (TMPEA-6), Ψ-2C-DFMO (ψ-2C-O-35))
  - Other substitution patterns (e.g., isomescaline, CT-5172)
- Tetramethoxyphenethylamines (TeMPEAs) (e.g., TeMPEA (2,3,4,5-TeMPEA), TeMPEA-2 (2,3,4,6-TeMPEA), TeMPEA-3 (2,3,5,6-TeMPEA))
- Pentamethoxyphenethylamine (PeMPEA or 2,3,4,5,6-PeMPEA)
- N-Benzylphenethylamines (NBOMes or N-benzyl-MPEAs) (e.g., 25I-NBOMe, NBOMe-mescaline, 24H-NBOMe)
- PEA-NDEPAs (e.g., PEA-NM-NDEPA, 3,4-DMPEA-NDEPA, 25D-NM-NDEAOP (25D-NM-NDEPA), M-NDEPA)

=== Amphetamines ===
- Monomethoxyamphetamines (MAs) (e.g., OMA (2-MA), MMA (3-MA), PMA (4-MA), 3-methoxy-4-methylamphetamine (MMA), 4-ETA, 2-TOM, 5-TOM, 2-TOET, 5-TOET, TOMSO)
  - N-Alkyl-MAs (e.g., methoxyphenamine (OMMA), MMMA, PMMA, PMEA)
- Dimethoxyamphetamines (DMAs) (e.g., 2,4-DMA (DMA-3), 2,5-DMA (DMA-4; DOH), 3,4-DMA, 3,5-DMA (DMA-6), 3,4-DMMA, methoxamine (β-OH-2,6-DMA))
  - DOx (4-substituted 2,5-DMAs) (e.g., DOB, DOC, DOET, DOI, DOM, Aleph (DOT))
    - N-Alkyl-DOx (e.g., Beatrice (methyl-DOM; MDOM), N-methyl-DOET, methyl-DOB (MDOB), N-methyl-DOI, IDNNA (N,N-dimethyl-DOI), N-methyl-TMA-2)
  - 3Cs (4-substituted 3,5-DMAs) (e.g., 4-Br-3,5-DMA, 4-PhPr-3,5-DMA)
  - Ψ-PEAs (4-substituted 2,6-DMAs) (e.g., Ψ-DOM, Ψ-DODFMO, TMA-6 (Ψ-TMA-2; 2,4,6-TMA))
- Trimethoxyamphetamines (TMAs) (e.g., TMA (3,4,5-TMA), TMA-2 (2,4,5-TMA), TMA-3 (2,3,4-TMA), TMA-4 (2,3,5-TMA), TMA-5 (2,3,6-TMA), TMA-6 (2,4,6-TMA; Ψ-TMA-2))
    - N-Alkyl-TMAs (e.g., N-methyl-TMA, N-methyl-TMA-2)
  - DOx (4-substituted 2,5-DMAs) (e.g., TMA-2, MEM, MPM, MALM, MMALM, MTFEM)
  - 3Cs (4-substituted 3,5-DMAs) (e.g., TMA (3C-M), 3C-E, 3C-P, 3C-AL, 3C-MAL, 3C-DFE, 3C-TFE, 3C-BZ)
  - Ψ-PEAs (4-substituted 2,6-DMAs) (e.g., TMA-6 (Ψ-TMA-2))
- Tetramethoxyamphetamines (TeMAs) (e.g., TeMA (2,3,4,5-TeMA), TeMA-2 (2,3,4,6-TeMA), TeMA-3 (2,3,5,6-TeMA))
- Pentamethoxyamphetamine (PeMPA or 2,3,4,5,6-PeMPA)
- N-Benzylphenethylamines (NBOMes or N-benzyl-MAs) (e.g., DOM-NBOMe, DOB-NBOMe, DOI-NBOMe)
- AMPH-NDEPAs (e.g., DOB-NDEPA, DOI-NDEPA, DOM-NDEPA, DOTFM-NDEPA, TMA-2-NDEPA)

=== Phenylisobutylamines ===
- 4Cs (4-substituted 2,5-dimethoxyphenylisobutylamines) (e.g., Ariadne (4C-D), 4C-B, 4C-I, 4C-P, 4C-T-2, 4C-TFM)
- Others (e.g., α-ethylmescaline (AEM))

=== α-Propylphenethylamines ===
- 5Cs (4-substituted 2,5-dimethoxy-α-propylphenethylamines) (e.g., 5C-D)
- Others (e.g., α-propylmescaline (APM))

=== Others and related compounds ===
==== Ring-extended phenethylamines ====
- Methylenedioxyphenethylamines (MDxx) (e.g., MDPEA (homopiperonylamine), MDMPEA (homarylamine), MDA (tenamfetamine), MDMA (midomafetamine), MDEA, BDB (J), MBDB (methyl-J), BDP (K), MPAP (PBDP; propyl-K), methylone (MDMC))
  - Monomethoxymethylenedioxyphenethylamines (MMPEAs) (e.g., lophophine (MMDPEA; 2C-MMDA-1), 2C-MMDA-2 (MMDPEA-2; 2C-2), 2C-MMDA-3a (MMDPEA-3a; 2C-3a), 2C-MMDA-4, MMDA, MMDA-2, MMDA-3a, MMDA-3b, MMDA-4, MMDA-5, EMDA-2)
  - Dimethoxymethylenedioxyphenethylamines (DMMPEAs) (e.g., 2C-DMMDA, 2C-DMMDA-2, DMMDA, DMMDA-2, DMMDA-3, DMMDA-4, DMMDA-5, DMMDA-6)
- Ethylenedioxyphenethylamines (EDxx) (e.g., EDA, EDMA, EDMC, MEDA)
- Benzofurans (e.g., 5-APB, 5-MAPB, 6-APB, 5-APDB, 6-APDB, F (F-1), F-2, F-22, DOH-5-hemiFLY (semi-fly), DOB-5-hemiFLY (bromo-semi-fly))
  - FLY compounds (benzodifurans) (e.g., 2C-B-FLY, DOB-FLY, Bromo-DragonFLY (DOB-DFLY), TFMFly)
- Methylenethiooxyphenethylamines (e.g., SDA (3T-MDA), SDMA (3T-MDMA), 4T-MMDA-2)
- Others (e.g., MTDA)

==== Rigid/constrained phenethylamines ====
- Tetrahydroisoquinolines (THIQs) (e.g., anhalinine, pellotine, lophophorine, DOM-CR, DOB-CR)
- Phenylcyclopropylamines (e.g., DMCPA, TMT)
- 1-Aminomethylindanes (1-AMIs) (e.g., 2CB-Ind, AMMI, jimscaline, bromojimscaline)
- 2-Aminoindanes (2-AIs) (e.g., DOM-AI, MDAI, MDMAI, MEAI, MMAI)
- 2-Aminotetralins (2-ATs) (e.g., DOM-AT, MDAT, MDMAT)
- Benzocyclobutenes (BCBs) (e.g., 2CBCB-NBOMe, TCB-2 (2CBCB), tomscaline, bromotomscaline)
- 3-Phenylpiperidines (3PIPs) (e.g., LPH-5, LPH-48, 2C-B-3PIP, 2C-B-3PIP-NBOMe, 2C-B-3PIP-POMe, DEMPDHPCA-2C-D)
- 2-Benzylpiperidines (e.g., DMBMPP (juncosamine))
- Phenylalkylpyrrolidines (e.g., MOPPP, MOPVP, MDPPP, MDPBP, MDPV, MDPHP, MDPEP)
- Others (e.g., 2C-B-aminorex (2C-B-AR), 2C-B-morpholine (2C-B-MOR), 2C-B-PYR, 2C-B-5-hemiFLY-α6 (BNAP), 2CB7 (2C-B-5-hemiFLY-β7), 2CBecca, 2CJP, 2CLisaB, 2CLisaH, CT-5126, TFMBOX, ZC-B)

== Other psychedelic phenethylamines ==
There are few known psychedelic phenethylamines that are not methoxyphenethylamines or related compounds like methylenedioxyphenethylamines or benzofurans. Those that are known include the 3-trifluoromethyl phenethylamine fenfluramine (likely via conversion into norfenfluramine), the 4-methyl phenethylamine 4-methylamphetamine (4-MA), the cyclized phenethylamine lorcaserin, and the benzothiophenes 5-APBT and 6-APBT. Certain other phenethylamines, like naphthylaminopropane (NAP; PAL-287), are also known to act as serotonin 5-HT_{2A} receptor agonists, but have not been assessed in terms of psychedelic-type effects in animals or humans. 4-Fluoroamphetamine (4-FA) has been described as producing a very mild "psychedelic" state, intermediate between that of amphetamine and MDMA, although it is unclear whether this is related to induction of monoamine release or serotonin 5-HT_{2A} receptor agonism.

== Compounds by substituents and substitution patterns ==
Substituted methoxyphenethylamines extended at the 4 position
Substituent	No ether (4-)				4-Ether (4-O-)				4-Thioether (4-S-)			
Substituent	2C	DOx	Scaline	3C	2C-O-x	DOO-x	Scaline-O-x	3C-O-x	2C-T-x	DOT-x	Scaline-T-x	3C-T-x
H	2C-H	2,5-DMA	3,5-DMPEA	3,5-DMA	–	DOOH	DESMETHYL	α-Me-DES…	2C-T-0	–	–	–
Methyl	2C-D	DOM	D/DESOXY	3C-D	2C-O	TMA-2	Mescaline	TMA	2C-T	Aleph	4-Thiomescaline	α-Me-4-TM
Ethyl	2C-E	DOET	DE	3C-DE	2C-O-2	MEM	Escaline	3C-E	2C-T-2	Aleph-2	4-Thioescaline	–
Methallyl	2C-MAL	–	DMAL	–	2C-O-3	MMALM	Methallylescaline	3C-MAL	2C-T-3	Aleph-3	–	–
Isopropyl	2C-IP	DOiP	DIP	–	2C-O-4	MIPM	Isoproscaline	3C-IP	2C-T-4	Aleph-4	–	–
Cyclohexyl	–	–	–	–	–	–	–	–	2C-T-5	Aleph-5	–	–
Phenyl	2C-Ph	–	Biscaline	–	–	–	Phescaline	–	2C-T-6	Aleph-6	–	–
Propyl	2C-P	DOPR	DP/DPR	3C-DP	2C-O-7	MPM	Proscaline	3C-P	2C-T-7	Aleph-7	4-Thioproscaline	–
Cyclopropylmethyl	–	DOCPM	–	–	–	–	Cyclopropylmescaline	3C-CPM	2C-T-8	Aleph-8	–	–
tert-Butyl	2C-tBu	DOTB	–	–	–	–	–	–	2C-T-9	–	–	–
Pyridin-2-yl	–	–	–	–	–	–	–	–	2C-T-10	–	–	–
4-Bromophenyl	–	–	–	–	–	–	–	–	2C-T-11	–	–	–
Morpholin-4-yl	2C-MOR	–	–	–	–	–	–	–	2C-T-12	–	–	–
2-Methoxyethyl	–	DOMeOEt	–	–	–	–	4-Methoxyescaline	–	2C-T-13	–	–	–
2-Methylthioethyl	–	DOMeSEt	–	–	–	–	4-Methylthioescaline	–	2C-T-14	–	–	–
Cyclopropyl	2C-CP	–	–	–	–	–	Cycloproscaline	–	2C-T-15	–	–	–
Allyl	2C-AL	–	DAL	3C-DAL	2C-O-16	MALM	Allylescaline	3C-AL	2C-T-16	Aleph-16	–	–
sec-Butyl	2C-sBu	DOSB	–	–	–	–	sec-Buscaline	–	2C-T-17	–	–	–
Cyclobutyl	2C-CB	–	–	–	–	–	–	–	2C-T-18	–	–	–
Butyl	2C-Bu	DOBU	–	–	2C-O-19	MBM	Buscaline	3C-B	2C-T-19	Aleph-19	4-Thiobuscaline	α-Me-4-TB
2-Fluoroethyl	2C-EF	DOEF	–	–	2C-O-21	MFEM	Fluoroescaline	3C-FE	2C-T-21	Aleph-21	–	–
2,2-Difluoroethyl	2C-DFE	–	–	–	2C-O-21.5	MDFEM	Difluoroescaline	3C-DFE	2C-T-21.5	–	–	–
2,2,2-Trifluoroethyl	2C-TFE	DOTFE	DTFE	3C-DTFE	2C-O-22	MTFEM	Trifluoroescaline	3C-TFE	2C-T-22	–	–	–
Cyclopentyl	2C-CPe	–	–	–	–	–	Cyclopentscaline	–	2C-T-23	–	–	–
Diethylamino	–	–	–	–	–	–	–	–	2C-T-24	–	–	–
Isobutyl	2C-iBu	DOIB	–	–	–	–	Isobuscaline	3C-IB	2C-T-25	–	–	–
1,3-Difluoroisopropyl	–	–	–	–	–	–	Difluoroisoproscaline	–	2C-T-26	–	–	–
Benzyl	2C-BN	DOBz	–	–	2C-O-27	MBZM	Benzscaline	3C-BZ	2C-T-27	–	–	–
3-Fluoropropyl	2C-FP	DOPF	–	–	2C-O-FP	–	Fluoroproscaline	3C-FP	2C-T-28	–	–	–
Propargyl	2C-YNP	–	–	–	–	–	PROPYNYL	–	2C-T-29	–	–	–
4-Fluorobutyl	–	–	–	–	–	–	–	–	2C-T-30	–	4F-TB	–
4-Trifluoromethylbenzyl	–	–	–	–	–	–	–	–	2C-T-31	–	–	–
Pentafluorobenzyl	–	–	–	–	–	–	–	–	2C-T-32	–	–	–
3-Methoxybenzyl	2C-MBM	DO3MeOBZ	–	–	–	–	–	–	2C-T-33	–	–	–
Fluoromethyl	2C-FM	DOFM	–	–	–	DOFMO	Fluoromescaline	–	2C-T-34	–	–	–
Difluoromethyl	2C-DFM	DODFM	–	–	–	DODFMO	Difluoromescaline	3C-DFM	2C-T-35	–	–	–
Trifluoromethyl	2C-TFM	DOTFM	DTFM	3C-DTFM	2C-O-TFM	DOTFMO	Trifluoromescaline	–	2C-T-36	Aleph-TFM	4-TM-TFM	–
Amyl	2C-AM	DOAM	±	±	–	MAM	Amylescaline	3C-A	±	Aleph-S-amyl	TA	–
Hexyl	2C-Hx	DOHx	–	–	–	–	Hexylescaline	3C-H	–	–	–	–
Ethenyl	2C-V	DOV	DV	3C-DV	–	–	Viscaline	–	–	–	–	–
Ethynyl	2C-YN	DOYN	DYN	–	–	–	–	–	–	–	–	–
Methoxymethyl	2C-MOM	DOMOM	4-MeOMe…	–	–	–	4-Methoxymescaline	–	–	–	–	–
Ethoxymethyl	2C-EOM	DOMOE	–	–	–	–	–	–	–	–	–	–
4-Methoxyphenyl	2C-BI-8	–	–	–	–	–	–	–	–	–	–	–
Phenylethyl	2C-PhEt	DOPhEt	–	–	–	–	Phenescaline	–	–	Aleph-S-PhEt	–	–
3-Phenylpropyl	2C-PhPr	DOPP	–	4-PhPr-3,5-DMA	–	–	–	–	–	–	–	–
Notes: (1) The "2C-X-20" row is absent because "2C-X-3" and "2C-X-20" are synonyms/the same compounds. (2) Missing compounds can be found at Isomer Design.

== See also ==
- Substituted phenethylamine
- PiHKAL: A Chemical Love Story (1991)
- The Shulgin Index, Volume One: Psychedelic Phenethylamines and Related Compounds (2011)
