= List of psychedelic drugs =

This is a list of psychedelic drugs, also known as serotonergic psychedelics or classical hallucinogens. These drugs act specifically as serotonin 5-HT_{2A} receptor agonists. They belong to three major structural families, including the tryptamines, phenethylamines, and lysergamides, although exceptions exist.

== Tryptamines ==
=== No ring substitutions ===
- N-(2-Cyanoethyl)tryptamine (CE-T)
- Deudimethyltryptamine (DMT-d10; HLP004; CYB004)
- Diallyltryptamine (DALT)
- Dibutyltryptamine (DBT)
- Diethyltryptamine (DET; T-9)
- Diisopropyltryptamine (DiPT)
- Dimethyltryptamine (DMT)
- Dimethyltryptamine-d4 (DMT-d4; D_{4}DMT)
- Dipropyltryptamine (DPT)
- Ethylisopropyltryptamine (EiPT)
- Ethylpropyltryptamine (EPT)
- Isopropylallyltryptamine (iPALT; ALiPT)
- Methylallyltryptamine (MALT)
- Methylcyclopropyltryptamine (McPT)
- Methylethyltryptamine (MET)
- Methylisopropyltryptamine (MiPT)
- Methylpropyltryptamine (MPT)
- N-Methyltryptamine (NMT)
- N-Phosphonooxymethyl-DMT (N-POM-DMT)
- Propylallyltryptamine (PALT)
- Propylisopropyltryptamine (PiPT)
- SPL028 (D_{2}-DMT)
- Tryptamine (T)

=== 4-Hydroxytryptamines ===
- 1-Methylpsilocin (CMY, CMY-16)
- 4-HO-DALT (daltocin)
- 4-HO-DBT
- 4-HO-DET (ethocin; CZ-74)
- 4-HO-DiPT (iprocin)
- 4-HO-DPT (deprocin)
- 4-HO-EPT (eprocin)
- 4-HO-MALT (maltocin)
- 4-HO-McPT
- 4-HO-MET (metocin)
- 4-HO-MiPT (miprocin)
- 4-HO-MPT (meprocin)
- 4-HO-NALT
- 4-HO-NBnT
- 4-HO-NET
- 4-HO-NiPT
- 4-HO-NPT
- 4-HO-TMT
- 4-HO-5-MeO-DMT
- 4-Hydroxytryptamine (4-HO-T; 4-HT)
- Deupsilocin (HLP003; CYB003)
- Psilocin (4-HO-DMT; CX-59)
- Psilomethoxin (5-MeO-4-HO-DMT)

==== 4-Phosphoryloxytryptamines ====
- 5-Methoxypsilocybin (5-MeO-4-PO-DMT)
- 5-Methylpsilocybin (5-Me-4-PO-DMT)
- Aeruginascin (4-PO-TMT)
- Baeocystin (4-PO-NMT)
- Ethocybin (4-PO-DET; CEY-19)
- Norbaeocystin (4-PO-T)
- Psilocybin (4-PO-DMT; CY-39)

==== 4-Acyloxytryptamines ====
- 4-AcO-DALT (daltacetin)
- 4-AcO-DET (ethacetin)
- 4-AcO-DiPT (ipracetin)
- 4-AcO-DMT (psilacetin)
- 4-AcO-DPT (depracetin)
- 4-AcO-EiPT (ethipracetin)
- 4-AcO-EPT
- 4-AcO-MALT
- 4-AcO-McPT
- 4-AcO-MET (metacetin)
- 4-AcO-MiPT (mipracetin)
- 4-AcO-MPT
- 4-GO-DMT (RE-109)
- 4-PrO-DiPT
- 4-PrO-DMT
- 4-PrO-MET
- Luvesilocin (4-GO-DiPT; RE-104, FT-104)

=== 5-Hydroxytryptamines ===
- 5-HO-MET
- Bufotenin (5-HO-DMT)
- Serotonin (5-HT; 5-HO-T)

==== 5-Acyloxytryptamines ====
- O-Acetylbufotenine (5-AcO-DMT)
- O-Pivalylbufotenine (5-t-BuCO-DMT)

=== 5-Methoxytryptamines ===
- 4-HO-5-MeO-DMT
- 5-MeO-2,N,N-TMT
- 5-MeO-DALT
- 5-MeO-DBT
- 5-MeO-DET
- 5-MeO-DiPT
- 5-MeO-DMT (mebufotenin)
- 5-MeO-DMT-d4
- 5-MeO-DPT
- 5-MeO-EiPT
- 5-MeO-MALT
- 5-MeO-MET
- 5-MeO-MiPT
- 5-MeO-MsBT
- 5-MeO-NiPT
- 5-MeO-NMT
- 5-MeO-T-NBOMe
- 5-MeO-T-NB3OMe
- 5-Methoxytryptamine (5-MeO-T; 5-MT)
- ASR-3001 (5-MeO-iPALT)
- NB-5-MeO-DALT
- NB-5-MeO-MiPT

=== Other ring substitutions ===
- 1-Acetyl-5-MeO-DMT
- 1-Benzoyl-DMT
- 2-Methyltryptamine
- 2,N,N-TMT (2-methyl-DMT)
- 4,N,N-TMT (4-methyl-DMT)
- 4-MeS-DMT
- 5-Bromo-DMT
- 5-Chloro-DMT
- 5-Fluoro-DMT
- 5-MeS-DMT
- 5-Nitro-T (Nitro-I)
- 5-PhO-T (OVT2)
- 5-N,N-TMT (5-methyl-DMT)
- 7,N,N-TMT (6-methyl-DMT)
- 5-MeO-2,N,N-TMT
- 6-Fluoro-DMT
- 6-Hydroxy-DET (6-HO-DET)
- 6-TFMO-DMT
- Bretisilocin (GM-2505; 5-fluoro-MET)
- HBL20016 (5-MeS-6-F-DMT)
- NBoc-DMT (NB-DMT)

=== α-Alkyltryptamines ===
- 4-HO-AMT
- 4-Methyl-AMT
- 5-Fluoro-AMT
- 6-Fluoro-AMT
- AMT (Indopan)
- α-Methylserotonin (5-HO-αMT)
- α,N,N-TMT (α-Me-DMT; Alpha-N)
- N-Hydroxy-AMT

==== 5-Methoxy-α-alkyltryptamines ====
- 5-MeO-AET
- 5-MeO-AMT (α,O-DMS; Alpha-O)
- α,N,O-TMS (5-MeO-α,N-DMT)
- α,N,N,O-TeMS (5-MeO-α,N,N-TMT)

=== Others ===
- N-DEAOP-Ts (e.g., N-DEAOP-NET, N-DEAOP-NMT, 5-MeO-N-DEAOP-NMT, 5-MeO-N-DEAOP-NET)

==== Structure undisclosed ====
- CT-4201
- EB-002 (EB-373)
- MSP-1014
- MYCO-004

=== Cyclized tryptamines ===
- Ergolines/lysergamides (e.g., LSD)
- Ibogalogs (e.g., ibogainalog, tabernanthalog, Pharm-136)
- O-Methylnordehydrobufotenine
- Partial ergolines (e.g., NDTDI, RU-28306, CT-5252)
- Piperidinylethylindoles (e.g., pip-T)
- Pyrrolidinylethylindoles (e.g., pyr-T, 5-MeO-pyr-T)
- Pyrrolidinylmethylindoles (e.g., MPMI, 4-HO-MPMI (lucigenol), 5-MeO-MPMI, MSP-2020)
- Tetrahydropyridinylindoles (e.g., RU-28253, NEtPhOH-3-THPI)

==== Unknown psychedelic activity ====
- β-Carbolines (e.g., pinoline, 1-ethyl-6-hydroxytryptoline, 1-(2,4,5-trimethoxyphenyl)-6-chlorotryptoline)

=== Tryptamine bioisosteres ===
- Benzofurans (e.g., 5-MeO-DiBF (1-oxa-5-MeO-DiPT), dimemebfe (5-MeO-BFE; 1-oxa-5-MeO-DMT), mebfap (5-MeO-3-APB; 1-oxa-5-MeO-AMT))
- Benzothiophenes (e.g., 3-APBT (1-thia-AMT))
- Indazolethylamines (e.g., AL-38022A, O-methyl-AL-34662)
- Indenylethylamines (e.g., C-DMT)
- Isotryptamines (e.g., 6-MeO-isoDMT, Ro60-0175)
- MYCO-005

==== Unknown psychedelic activity ====
- Quinolinylethylamines (e.g., mefloquine)

== Phenethylamines ==
=== Scalines ===
- 2-Bromomescaline
- 4-D (4-trideuteromescaline)
- Allylescaline (AL)
- Alpha-D (α-D; α,α-dideuteromescaline)
- Alpha,Beta-D (α,β-D; α,β-dideuteromescaline)
- Beta-D (β-D; β-dideuteromescaline)
- Cyclopropylmescaline (CPM)
- Difluoroescaline (DFE)
- Difluoromescaline (DFM)
- N,N-Diformylmescaline
- Escaline (E)
- Fluoroescaline (FE)
- Fluoroproscaline (FP)
- N-Formylmescaline
- Isobuscaline (IB)
- Isoproscaline (IP)
- Mescaline (M; 3,4,5-TMPEA)
- Metadifluoromescaline (MDFM)
- Metaescaline (ME)
- Methallylescaline (MAL)
- N-Methylmescaline (M-M)
- Proscaline (P)
- Trichocereine (N,N-dimethylmescaline; MM-M)
- Trifluoroescaline (TFE)
- Trifluoromescaline (TFM)

==== Thioscalines ====
- 3-Thioasymbescaline (3-TASB)
- 3-Thioescaline (3-TE)
- 3-Thiomescaline (3-TM)
- 3-Thiometaescaline (3-TME)
- 4-Thioasymbescaline (4-TASB)
- 4-Thioescaline (4-TE)
- 4-Thiomescaline (4-TM)
- 5-Thioasymbescaline (5-TASB)
- Thiobuscaline (TB; 4-TB)
- Thioproscaline (TP; 4-TP)

==== Desoxyscalines ====
- 4-Desoxymescaline (desoxy, desoxymescaline)

==== Others ====
- Jimscaline
- Tomscaline

=== 2C-x ===
- 2C-B
- 2CB-2OCD_{3}
- 2CB-5OCD_{3}
- 2C-Bu
- 2C-C
- 2C-CN
- 2C-CP
- 2C-D
- 2C-E
- 2C-EF
- 2C-F
- 2C-H
- 2C-I
- 2C-iBu
- 2C-iP
- 2C-N
- 2C-P
- 2C-Se
- 2C-Se-TFM
- 2C-tBu
- 2C-TFE
- 2C-TFM
- 2C-YN
- 2C-V

==== 2C-T-x ====
- 2C-T
- 2C-T-2
- 2C-T-3 (2C-T-20)
- 2C-T-4
- 2C-T-7
- 2C-T-8
- 2C-T-9
- 2C-T-13
- 2C-T-15
- 2C-T-16
- 2C-T-17
- 2C-T-19
- 2C-T-21
- 2C-T-21.5
- 2C-T-22
- 2C-T-25
- 2C-T-27
- 2C-T-28
- 2C-T-30
- 2C-T-36 (2C-T-TFM; CYB210010; CYB2108)
- CYB2108D (deuterated 2C-T-36)

==== 2C-O-x ====
- 2C-O (2,4,5-TMPEA; TMPEA-2)
- 2C-O-4
- 2C-O-22

==== Others ====
- 2C-B-AN
- 2C-DB
- 2C-G-x (e.g., 2C-G-3, 2C-G-5)
- β-Keto-2C-B (βk-2C-B)
- β-Keto-2C-I (βk-2C-I)
- β-Methyl-2C-B (BMB)
- BOx (e.g., BOB, BOD, BOHB)
- HOT-x (e.g., HOT-2, HOT-7, HOT-17)
- N-Ethyl-2C-B
- TWEETIOs (e.g., 2CB-2-EtO, 2CD-2-EtO, 2CD-5-EtO, 2CE-5-EtO, 2CE-5iPrO, 2CT-5-EtO, 2CT2-2-EtO, 2CT7-2-EtO, ASR-2001 (2CB-5-PrO))

=== 3C-x ===
- 3C-AL
- 3C-BZ
- 3C-DFE
- 3C-E
- 3C-FP
- 3C-MAL
- 3C-P
- TMA (3C-M)

==== Others ====
- α-Chloromethylmescaline

=== DOx ===
- DOAM
- DOB
- DOBU
- DOC
- DOEF
- DOET
- DOH (2,5-DMA)
- DOI
- DOIB
- DOIP
- DOM
- DON
- DOPR
- DOTFM
- DOYN

==== Aleph-x (DOT-x) ====
- Aleph (DOT)
- Aleph-2
- Aleph-4
- Aleph-6
- Aleph-7

==== TMA-2 and derivatives (Mxx) ====
- MALM
- MEM
- MDFEM
- MFEM
- MIPM
- MMALM
- MPM
- MTFEM
- TMA-2

==== Others ====
- βk-DOB
- DODB
- DODC
- DOM-NBOMe
- DOTMA
- Ganeshas (G-x) (e.g., Ganesha (G, G-0), G-3, G-5)
- MME (TMA2-5-EtO)
- N-Hydroxy-DOM

=== 4C-x ===
- 4C-B
- 4C-D (Ariadne)
- 4C-I
- 4C-P (4C-Pr)
- 4C-T-2
- 4C-TFM

=== Ψ-PEA ===
- 2,4,6-TMPEA-NBOMe
- Ψ-2C-DFMO (ψ-2C-O-35)
- Ψ-2C-T-4
- Ψ-DODFMO
- Ψ-DOM
- TMA-6 (Ψ-TMA-2)

=== MDxx ===
- 5-Methyl-MDA
- 6-Methyl-MDA
- DMMDA
- DMMDA-2
- EIDA
- EMDA-2
- IDA
- Lophophine (MMDPEA)
- Lys-MDA
- MDA (tenamfetamine)
- MDHMA (FLEA; MDMOH)
- MDMA (midomafetamine; ecstasy)
- MDOH
- MMDA
- MMDA-2
- MMDA-3a
- MMDA-3b
- MMDMA
- N-t-BOC-MDMA
- (R)-MDMA

=== FLY ===
- 2C-B-FLY
- 2C-B-DragonFLY
- 2C-E-FLY
- 2C-EF-FLY
- 2C-I-FLY
- 2CBFly-NBOMe
- Bromo-DragonFLY
- DOB-FLY
- DOH-FLY
- TFMFly

==== Hemi/semi-FLY drugs ====
- DOH-5-hemiFLY (semi-fly; SF)
- DOB-5-hemiFLY (bromo-semi-fly; B-SF)

=== 25x-NB (NBOMes) ===
==== 25x-NBOMe ====
- 25B-NBOMe
- 25C-NBOMe
- 25CN-NBOMe
- 25D-NBOMe
- 25E-NBOMe
- 25F-NBOMe
- 25G-NBOMe
- 25H-NBOMe
- 25I-NBOMe
- 25iP-NBOMe
- 25N-NBOMe
- 25O-NBOMe
- 25P-NBOMe
- 25T-NBOMe
- 25T2-NBOMe
- 25T4-NBOMe
- 25T7-NBOMe
- 25TFM-NBOMe

==== 25x-NBOH ====
- 25B-NBOH
- 25C-NBOH
- 25CN-NBOH
- 25E-NBOH
- 25I-NBOH

==== 25x-NBF ====
- 25B-NBF
- 25C-NBF
- 25I-NBF

==== Others ====
- 2,4,6-TMPEA-NBOMe
- 25B-NB (N-benzyl-2C-B)
- 2C-B-AN
- 2C2-NBOMe
- 2CBCB-NBOMe
- 2CBFly-NBOMe
- DOM-NBOMe
- NBOMe-escaline
- NBOMe-mescaline
- TGF-8027

=== Others ===
- 2-DM-DOM
- 25B-NAcPip
- 4-HA
- 4-MA
- 5-APDI (IAP)
- 5-DM-DOM
- 6-Br-DMPEA
- Benzofurans (e.g., 5-APB, 5-APDB, 6-APB, 6-APDB, F, F-2, F-22)
- Benzothiophenes (e.g., 5-APBT, 6-APBT)
- BMB-202
- CT-5172
- DMAs (e.g., 2,4-DMA, 3,4-DMA)
- Fenfluramine
- MMA (3-MeO-4-MA)
- Norfenfluramine
- PEA-NDEPAs (e.g., 25D-NM-NDEAOP, DOB-NDEPA, DOI-NDEPA, DOM-NDEPA, DOTFM-NDEPA, M-NDEPA, TMA-2-NDEPA)
- PMA (4-MA)
- Thio-2Cs (e.g., 2C-5-TOET)
- Thio-DOx (e.g., 2-TOM, 5-TOET, 5-TOM, TOMSO)
- TMAs (e.g., TMA-3, TMA-4, TMA-5)
- ZDCM-04 (DOC-fenethylline)

==== Structure undisclosed ====
- HLP005 (CYB005)

=== Cyclized phenethylamines ===
- 1-Aminomethylindanes (e.g., 2CB-Ind, jimscaline)
- 2-Aminoindanes (e.g., DOM-AI)
- 2-Aminotetralins (e.g., UH-232)
- 3-Benzazepines (e.g., lorcaserin)
- 3-Phenylpiperidines (e.g., LPH-5, LPH-48)
- Benzocyclobutenes (e.g., 2CBCB-NBOMe, TCB-2, tomscaline)
- Benzoxepins (e.g., BBOX, IBOX, TFMBOX)
- DMBMPP (juncosamine)
- Ergolines/lysergamides (e.g., LSD)
- Partial ergolines (e.g., NDTDI, UCD0179, UCD0120, UCD0120-M, UCD0120-NAP)
- Phenylcyclopropylamines (e.g., DMCPA, TMT)
- Phenyloxazolamines (aminorexes) (e.g., 2C-B-aminorex)
- Pyridopyrroloquinoxalines (e.g., IHCH-7113)
- Z3517967757
- ZC-B

==== Unknown psychedelic activity ====
- Aporphines and noraporphines (e.g., glaucine, 11-methoxyasimilobine, 2-hydroxy-11-(2-methylallyl)oxynoraporphine)

== Lysergamides ==
=== No substitutions ===
- Ergine (LSA, LA-111)
- Isoergine (iso-LSA, iso-LA)

=== Amide-substituted lysergamides ===
- DAL
- DAM (DAM-57)
- DiPLA
- DPL
- EcPLA
- EiPLA
- EPLA (LEP; LEP-57)
- Ergometrine (ergonovine, ergobasine)
- ETFELA
- iPLA
- LA-3Cl-SB (Cl-LSB)
- LAE (LAE-32)
- LAM
- LAMPA
- LAP
- LME (LME-54)
- LMP (LMP-55)
- LPD (LPD-824)
- LSB
- LSD (LSD-25, METH-LAD; lysergide)
- LSD-Pip
- LSDP (DPL)
- LSH (LAH)
- LSM (LSM-775)
- 2-LSP
- LSP (3-LSP)
- LSZ (LA-SS-Az)
- Lysergic acid pyrrolinide (LPN)
- Methylergometrine (methylergonovine, methylergobasine)
- MiPLA

=== 6-Alkyllysergamides ===
- BU-LAD
- CE-LAD (CHLORETH-LAD)
- CPM-LAD
- CYP-LAD (TRALA-22)
- ETH-LAD
- FLUORETH-LAD (FE-LAD)
- FP-LAD
- IP-LAD
- NBOMe-LAD
- PARGY-LAD
- PRO-LAD

=== 1-Alkyllysergamides (prodrugs) ===
- Methysergide (1-methylmethylergonovine; UML-491)
- MLA-74 (1-methyl-LAE)
- MLD-41 (1-methyl-LSD)
- MPD-75 (1-methyl-LPD)
- OML-632 (1-hydroxymethyl-LSD)

=== 1-Acyllysergamides (prodrugs) ===
- 1-Formyl-LSD
- 1B-LSD
- 1BP-LSD
- 1Bz-LSD
- 1cP-AL-LAD
- 1cP-LSD
- 1cP-MiPLA
- 1D-AL-LAD
- 1D-LSD
- 1DD-LSD
- 1F-LSD
- 1Fe-LSD
- 1H-LSD
- 1P-AL-LAD
- 1P-ETH-LAD
- 1P-LSD
- 1P-MiPLA
- 1S-LSD
- 1SB-LSD (1BS-LSD; 1-TMSBz-LSD)
- 1T-AL-LAD
- 1T-LSD
- 1V-LSD
- ALA-10 (1-acetyl-LAE; 1A-LAE)
- ALD-52 (1-acetyl-LSD; 1A-LSD)

=== Others ===
- 2,3-Dihydro-LSD
- 12-Hydroxy-LSD
- 12-Methoxy-LSD
- 14-Methyl-LSD

=== Lysergamide bioisosteres ===
- JRT (isotryptamine-LSD)

== Others ==
- 9-Oxaergolines (e.g., RU-29717)
- γ-Carbolines (e.g., tiflucarbine)
- Arylpiperazines (e.g., 2C-B-PP, 2-NP, mCPP, MK-212, ORG-12962, pCPP, pFPP, quipazine, TFMPP, VCU-1012)
- Dihydrobenzoxazines (e.g., efavirenz)
- Ergolines (e.g., pergolide)
- Phenoxyethylamines (e.g., CT-4719, ORG-37684)
- Pyridopyrroloquinoxalines (e.g., IHCH-7113)
- Quinazolinylethylamines (e.g., RH-34)

=== Structure undisclosed ===
- EGX-A
- EGX-B
- Lucid-PSYCH (Lucid-201)
- MSP-4018
- MSP-4019
- MSP-4020

== Natural sources ==
=== Tryptamines ===
- Acacia spp. (e.g., Acacia acuminata, Acacia confusa)
- Ayahuasca and vinho de Jurema (e.g., Psychotria viridis (chacruna), Dipolopterys cabrerana (chaliponga, chacruna), Mimosa tenuiflora (Mimosa hostilis; jurema))
- Brosimum (e.g., Brosimum acutifolium (takini))
- Hallucinogenic snuffs (e.g., Anadenanthera peregrina (yopo, jopo, cohoba, parica, ebene), Anadenanthera colubrina (vilca, cebil))
- Incilius alvarius (Bufo alvarius; Colorado River toad, Sonoran Desert toad; bufo)
- Psilocybin-containing mushrooms (magic mushrooms, shrooms) (e.g., Psilocybe cubensis, Psilocybe mexicana (teonanacatl))

=== Phenethylamines ===
- Echinopsis cacti (e.g., San Pedro, Peruvian torch)
- Pachycereus cacti (e.g., Pachycereus pecten-aboriginum, Pachycereus pringlei)
- Peyote (Lophophora williamsii; peyotl)

=== Lysergamides ===
- Achnatherum robustum (sleepy grass)
- Epichloë spp.
- Ergot (Claviceps) (e.g., Claviceps purpurea, Claviceps paspali)
- Morning glory (Convolvulaceae) seeds (e.g., Ipomoea tricolor (tlitliltzin, badoh negro; Ipomoea violacea), Ipomoea corymbosa (coaxihuitl, ololiúqui; Rivea Corymbosa, Turbina Corymbosa), Argyreia nervosa (Hawaiian baby woodrose; HBWR))
- Periglandula spp. (e.g., Periglandula ipomoeae, Periglandula clandestina)

== See also ==
- List of drugs
- List of hallucinogens
- List of entheogens
- List of entactogens
- List of designer drugs
- List of investigational hallucinogens and entactogens
- List of psychoactive drugs
- Psychedelic plants
- PiHKAL and TiHKAL
- List of psychedelic chemists
- List of psychedelic pharmaceutical companies
