= C15H23NO3 =

The molecular formula C_{15}H_{23}NO_{3} may refer to:

- 3C-MAL
- Etilefrine pivalate
- Oxprenolol
- MMALM
