= C11H15F2NO3 =

The molecular formula C_{11}H_{15}F_{2}NO_{3} (molar mass : 247.242 g/mol) may refer to:

- Difluoromescaline
- Metadifluoromescaline
- Ψ-2C-DFMO
