= C13H20FNO3 =

The molecular formula C_{13}H_{20}FNO_{3} (molar mass: 257.305 g/mol) may refer to:

- 3C-FE
- Fluoroproscaline
- MFEM (drug)
