= 2C-T-21.5 =

Chemical compound

Clinical data
- Other names: 4-(2,2-Difluoroethylthio)-2,5-dimethoxyphenethylamine; 2,5-Dimethoxy-4-(2,2-difluoroethylthio)phenethylamine; 2C-T-DFE
- Routes of administration: Oral
- Drug class: Serotonin receptor modulator; Serotonin 5-HT_{2A} receptor agonist; Serotonergic psychedelic; Hallucinogen

Pharmacokinetic data
- Duration of action: 8–14 hours

Identifiers
- IUPAC name: 2-[4-(3,3-difluoropropylsulfanyl)-2,5-dimethoxyphenyl]ethanamine
- CAS Number: 754184-57-1 648957-46-4 (hydrochloride)
- PubChem CID: 12063258

Chemical and physical data
- Formula: C_{12}H_{17}F_{2}NO_{2}S
- Molar mass: 277.33 g·mol^{−1}
- 3D model (JSmol): Interactive image
- SMILES: COC1=CC(=C(C=C1CCN)OC)SCC(F)F
- InChI: InChI=1S/C12H17F2NO2S/c1-16-9-6-11(18-7-12(13)14)10(17-2)5-8(9)3-4-15/h5-6,12H,3-4,7,15H2,1-2H3; Key:LVCSIKISADNGMR-UHFFFAOYSA-N

2C-T-21.5, also known as 4-(2,2-difluoroethylthio)-2,5-dimethoxyphenethylamine or as 2C-T-DFE, is a lesser-known psychedelic drug related to compounds such as 2C-T-21 and 2C-T-28. It was originally named by Alexander Shulgin and discussed in his book PiHKAL (Phenethylamines I Have Known and Loved), but was not synthesised at that time. 2C-T-21.5 was ultimately synthesised and tested by Daniel Trachsel some years later. It has a binding affinity of 146 nM at 5-HT_{2A} and 55 nM at 5-HT_{2C}. It produces typical psychedelic effects, being slightly less potent but somewhat longer acting than 2C-T-2 or 2C-T-21, with an active dose of 12–30 mg, and a duration of action of 8–14 hours. Unlike 2C-T-21 it will not form the highly toxic fluoroacetate as a metabolite, instead producing the less toxic difluoroacetic acid. It is a controlled substance in Canada under phenethylamine blanket-ban language.

== See also ==
- 2C (psychedelics)
- 2C-T-22
- 2C-T-16
- 2C-T-35
- 2C-T-TFM
- 2C-TFE
- 3C-DFE
- DOPF
- Trifluoromescaline
- 2C-x
- DOx
- 25-NB
