= C12H17F2NO3 =

The molecular formula C_{12}H_{17}F_{2}NO_{3} (molar mass : 261.269 g/mol) may refer to:

- Difluoroescaline
- Ψ-DODFMO
- 3C-DFM
