= 3C-P =

Psychedelic drug

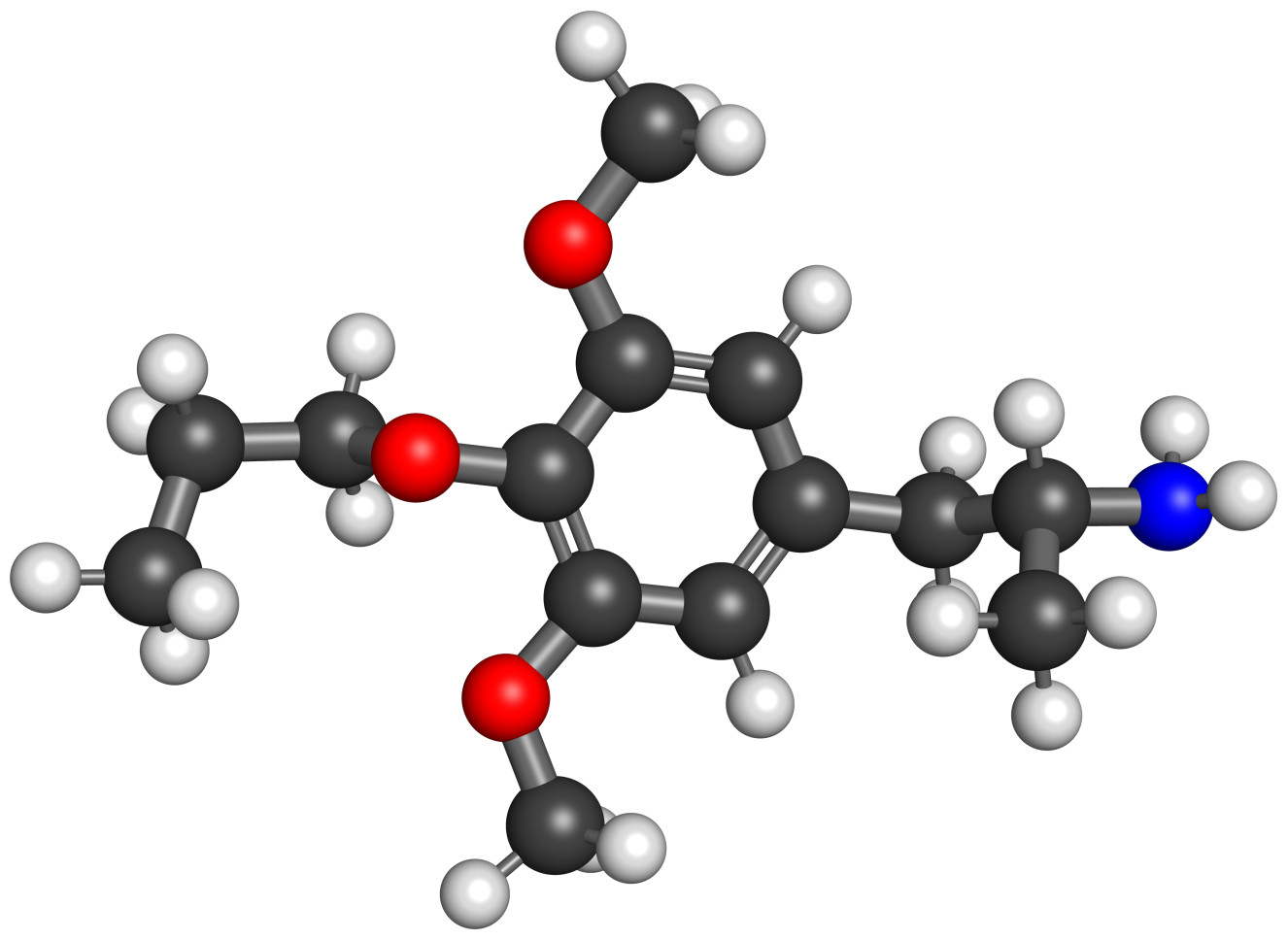

Clinical data
- Other names: 4-Propoxy-3,5-dimethoxyamphetamine; 3,5-Dimethoxy-4-propoxyamphetamine; α-Methylproscaline; 3C-Proscaline
- Routes of administration: Oral
- Drug class: Serotonergic psychedelic; Hallucinogen

Legal status
- Legal status: DE: NpSG (Industrial and scientific use only); UK: Class A

Pharmacokinetic data
- Duration of action: Unknown

Identifiers
- IUPAC name: 1-(3,5-dimethoxy-4-propoxyphenyl)propan-2-amine
- CAS Number: 501700-11-4
- PubChem CID: 54929142
- ChemSpider: 21106238
- UNII: 4KRX4MHV7L
- CompTox Dashboard (EPA): DTXSID201234925

Chemical and physical data
- Formula: C_{14}H_{23}NO_{3}
- Molar mass: 253.342 g·mol^{−1}
- 3D model (JSmol): Interactive image
- SMILES: CC(N)Cc1cc(OC)c(OCCC)c(c1)OC
- InChI: InChI=1S/C14H23NO3/c1-5-6-18-14-12(16-3)8-11(7-10(2)15)9-13(14)17-4/h8-10H,5-7,15H2,1-4H3; Key:KKMCHCCXGKYEKJ-UHFFFAOYSA-N

3C-P, also known as 4-propoxy-3,5-dimethoxyamphetamine or as α-methylproscaline (3C-proscaline), is a psychedelic drug of the phenethylamine, amphetamine, and 3C families related to 3,4,5-trimethoxyamphetamine (TMA). It is the amphetamine (3C) analogue of proscaline.

== Use and effects ==
3C-P has been reported to have a dose range of 20 to 40 mg orally, with a typical dose estimate of 30 mg, based on informal anecdotal reports. Although 3C-P produces hallucinogenic effects, very little is known about its effects.

== Pharmacology ==
=== Pharmacodynamics ===
3C-P acts as a serotonin 5-HT_{2} receptor agonist, including of the serotonin 5-HT_{2A} receptor. It produces the head-twitch response, a behavioral proxy of psychedelic effects, in rodents.

== Chemistry ==
=== Synthesis ===
The chemical synthesis of 3C-P has been described.

=== Analogues ===
Analogues of 3C-P include TMA, MEM, 3C-E, 3C-AL, 3C-MAL, and 3C-FP, among others.

== History ==
3C-P was first described in the scientific literature by Otakar Leminger by 1972. Alexander Shulgin mentioned it in his 1991 book PiHKAL (Phenethylamines I Have Known and Loved) and Daniel Trachsel synthesized it in 2002, but neither of them reported its properties or effects in humans. The drug has been sold online as a designer drug and was first detected in September 2013 in Finland.

== Society and culture ==
=== Legal status ===
==== Canada ====
3C-P is a controlled substance in Canada under amphetamine blanket-ban language.

==== United States ====
3C-P is not an explicitly controlled substance in the United States, although it would most likely be considered a controlled substance under the Federal Analogue Act as an analogue of 2C-P.

== See also ==
- 3C (psychedelics)
