= C12H16F3NO2 =

The molecular formula C_{12}H_{16}F_{3}NO_{2} (molar mass: 263.260 g/mol) may refer to:

- DOTFM
- 2C-TFE
