= 3C (psychedelics) =

Class of chemical compounds

3,4,5-Trimethoxyamphetamine (3,4,5-TMA; TMA-1).

3C (3C-x), also known as 4-substituted 3,5-dimethoxyamphetamines, substituted 3,4,5-trimethoxyamphetamine (3,4,5-TMA or TMA-1) analogues, or 3C-scalines, is a general name for the family of psychedelic amphetamines containing methoxy groups at the 3 and 5 positions of the benzene ring. These compounds are analogues of 3,4,5-trimethoxyamphetamine (3,4,5-TMA or TMA-1).

The 3C drugs are not the amphetamine counterparts of the 2C drugs, which are 4-substituted 2,5-dimethoxyphenethylamines. Instead, the DOx drugs, which are 4-substituted 2,5-dimethoxyamphetamines, are the amphetamine counterparts of the 2C drugs. The 3C drugs are the amphetamine counterparts of scalines (4-substituted 3,5-dimethoxyphenethylamines). Moreover, in terms of naming with the "3C" prefix, the 3C drugs are generally actually derivatives of TMA-1 with the 4-position methoxy group extended rather than having any 4-position substituent. In this regard, they would be the 3,5-dimethoxyamphetamine counterparts of the 2C-O (2,4,5-trimethoxyphenethylamine) drugs (e.g., 2C-O-4) and the 2,4,5-trimethoxyamphetamine (2,4,5-TMA; TMA-2) derivatives (e.g., MEM).

3C drugs have been developed and/or studied by Alexander Shulgin and Daniel Trachsel, among others. The pharmacology of 3C drugs has been studied and described.

== Use and effects ==
Doses and durations of 3C drugs
Compound	Chemical name	Dose	Duration
TMA (3C-M)	3,4,5-Trimethoxyamphetamine	100–250 mg	6–8 hours
3C-AL	4-Allyloxy-3,5-dimethoxyamphetamine	15–30 mg	8–12 hours
3C-BZ	4-Benzyloxy-3,5-dimethoxyamphetamine	25–200 mg	18–24 hours
3C-CPM	4-Cyclopropylmethoxy-3,5-dimethoxyamphetamine	Unknown	Unknown
3C-DFE	4-(2,2-Difluoroethoxy)-3,5-dimethoxyamphetamine	22 mg	~10 hours
3C-DFM	4-(2,2-Difluoromethoxy)-3,5-dimethoxyamphetamine	Unknown	Unknown
3C-E	4-Ethoxy-3,5-dimethoxyamphetamine	30–60 mg	8–12 hours
3C-FE	4-(2-Fluoroethoxy)-3,5-dimethoxyamphetamine	>24 mg	Unknown
3C-FP	4-(3-Fluoropropoxy)-3,5-dimethoxyamphetamine	≥25 mg	~8 hours
3C-IB	4-Isobutoxy-3,5-dimethoxyamphetamine	Unknown	Unknown
3C-IP	4-Isopropoxy-3,5-dimethoxyamphetamine	Unknown	Unknown
3C-MAL	4-Methallyloxy-3,5-dimethoxyamphetamine	Unknown	Unknown
3C-P	4-Propoxy-3,5-dimethoxyamphetamine	20–40 mg	Unknown
3C-TFE	4-(2,2,2-Trifluoroethoxy)-3,5-dimethoxyamphetamine	30 mg	~15 hours
Refs:

== List of 3C drugs ==
=== 4-Alkoxylated ===
- 3,4,5-Trimethoxyamphetamine (3,4,5-TMA; TMA-1; 3C-mescaline)
- 3C-AL (3C-allylescaline) (4-allyloxy-3,5-dimethoxyamphetamine)
- 3C-BZ (3C-benzscaline) (4-benzyloxy-3,5-dimethoxyamphetamine)
- 3C-CPM (3C-cyclopropylmescaline) (4-cyclopropylmethoxy-3,5-dimethoxyamphetamine)
- 3C-DFE (3C-difluoroescaline) (4-(2,2-difluoroethoxy)-3,5-dimethoxyamphetamine)
- 3C-DFM (3C-difluoromescaline) (4-(2,2-difluoromethoxy)-3,5-dimethoxyamphetamine)
- 3C-E (3C-escaline) (4-ethoxy-3,5-dimethoxyamphetamine)
- 3C-FE (3C-fluoroescaline) (4-(2-fluoroethoxy)-3,5-dimethoxyamphetamine)
- 3C-FP (3C-fluoroproscaline) (4-(3-fluoropropoxy)-3,5-dimethoxyamphetamine)
- 3C-IB (3C-isobuscaline) (4-isobutoxy-3,5-dimethoxyamphetamine)
- 3C-IP (3C-isoproscaline) (4-isopropoxy-3,5-dimethoxyamphetamine)
- 3C-MAL (3C-methallylescaline) (4-methallyloxy-3,5-dimethoxyamphetamine)
- 3C-P (3C-proscaline) (4-propoxy-3,5-dimethoxyamphetamine)
- 3C-TFE (3C-trifluoroescaline) (4-(2,2,2-trifluoroethoxy)-3,5-dimethoxyamphetamine)

=== Other 4-substituted ===
- 4-Br-3,5-DMA (4-bromo-3,5-dimethoxyamphetamine)
- 4-I-3,5-DMA (4-iodo-3,5-dimethoxyamphetamine)
- 4-PhPr-3,5-DMA (4-(3-phenylpropyl)-3,5-dimethoxyamphetamine)

=== 2- or 6-Substituted ===
- 2-Bromo-TMA (2-bromo-3,4,5-trimethoxyamphetamine)
- 2,3,4,5-Tetramethoxyamphetamine (TeMA; 2,3,4,5-TeMA; 2-methoxy-TMA)
- 2,3,4,5,6-Pentamethoxyamphetamine (PeMA; 2,3,4,5,6-PeMA; 2,6-dimethoxy-TMA)

=== N-Substituted ===
- Methyl-TMA (N-methyl-TMA) (N-methyl-3,4,5-trimethoxyamphetamine)

=== Others ===
- α-Chloromethylmescaline (α-Cl-M; α-CMe-M) (3,4,5-trimethoxy-α-chloromethylphenethylamine)

== See also ==
- Substituted methoxyphenethylamine
- 3,5-Dimethoxyamphetamine (3,5-DMA)
- Scaline
- PiHKAL (Phenethylamines I Have Known and Loved)
- The Shulgin Index, Volume One: Psychedelic Phenethylamines and Related Compounds
