= Α-Chloromethylmescaline =

α-Chloromethylmescaline

Clinical data
- Other names: α-CMe-M; 3,4,5-Trimethoxy-α-chloromethylphenethylamine
- Drug class: Psychedelic drug; Hallucinogen
- ATC code: None

Identifiers
- IUPAC name: 1-chloro-3-(3,4,5-trimethoxyphenyl)propan-2-amine
- CAS Number: 49557-34-8
- PubChem CID: 162376657

Chemical and physical data
- Formula: C_{12}H_{18}ClNO_{3}
- Molar mass: 259.73 g·mol^{−1}
- 3D model (JSmol): Interactive image
- SMILES: COC1=CC(=CC(=C1OC)OC)CC(CCl)N
- InChI: InChI=1S/C12H18ClNO3/c1-15-10-5-8(4-9(14)7-13)6-11(16-2)12(10)17-3/h5-6,9H,4,7,14H2,1-3H3; Key:JQXARIHJXXXTKR-UHFFFAOYSA-N

α-Chloromethylmescaline (α-CMe-M) is a psychedelic drug of the phenethylamine, amphetamine, and 3C families related to mescaline and TMA (3,4,5-trimethoxyamphetamine; α-methylmescaline). It is the derivative of mescaline with an α-chloromethyl group and the derivative of TMA in which the α-methyl group has been replaced with an α-chloromethyl group.

== Pharmacology ==
=== Pharmacodynamics ===
α-Chloromethylmescaline produces the head-twitch response, a behavioral proxy of psychedelic effects, in rodents, and the response was similar to that of mescaline in terms of aspects like dose, frequency, and duration. It was developed as a potential alkylating analogue of mescaline that would irreversibly bind to receptors, but did not show associated properties such as a long duration or blockade of mescaline effects.

== Chemistry ==
The chemical synthesis of α-chloromethylmescaline has been described. An analogue, α-chloromethylphenethylamine (α-CMe-PEA), which is the analogue of amphetamine in which the α-methyl group has been replaced with an α-chloromethyl group, produced amphetamine-like stimulant effects of short duration in rodents, also consistent with non-alkylating and reversible action.

== History ==
α-Chloromescaline was first described in the scientific literature by Paul D. Cooper in 1973. Subsequently, it was included in Alexander Shulgin's book The Shulgin Index, Volume One: Psychedelic Phenethylamines and Related Compounds in 2011.

== See also ==
- 3C (psychedelics)
- CE-LAD
