= 2C-T-36 =

Chemical compound

Clinical data
- Other names: 2C-T-TFM; CYB210010; CYB-210010; CYB-2108; CYB2108; 2,5-Dimethoxy-4-(trifluoromethylsulfanyl)phenethylamine
- Routes of administration: Unknown
- Drug class: Serotonin 5-HT_{2} receptor agonist; Serotonergic psychedelic; Hallucinogen

Pharmacokinetic data
- Duration of action: Unknown

Identifiers
- IUPAC name: 2-[2,5-dimethoxy-4-(trifluoromethylsulfanyl)phenyl]ethanamine
- CAS Number: 2762567-99-5
- PubChem CID: 168072159

Chemical and physical data
- Formula: C_{11}H_{14}F_{3}NO_{2}S
- Molar mass: 281.29 g·mol^{−1}
- 3D model (JSmol): Interactive image
- SMILES: COC1=CC(=C(C=C1CCN)OC)SC(F)(F)F
- InChI: InChI=1S/C11H14F3NO2S/c1-16-8-6-10(18-11(12,13)14)9(17-2)5-7(8)3-4-15/h5-6H,3-4,15H2,1-2H3; Key:VOGDBAZLGHXJBS-UHFFFAOYSA-N

2C-T-36, also known as 2,5-dimethoxy-4-(trifluoromethylsulfanyl)phenethylamine or 2C-T-TFM as well as CYB210010 or CYB2108, is a psychedelic drug of the phenethylamine and 2C families.

== Use and effects ==
The properties and effects of 2C-T-36 in humans appear to be unknown.

== Pharmacology ==
=== Pharmacodynamics ===
2C-T-36 has a K_{i} of 0.35 nM at the serotonin 5-HT_{2A} receptor, and an EC_{50} of 4.1 nM at the serotonin 5-HT_{2A} receptor and 7.3 nM at the serotonin 5-HT_{2C} receptor, compared to 88 nM at the serotonin 5-HT_{2B} receptor. It is a potent, selective, long acting, and orally active agonist for the serotonin 5-HT_{2A} and 5-HT_{2C} receptors and produces psychedelic-like responding in several different animal species. The interactions of 2C-T-36 with numerous other receptors and targets have also been described.

== Chemistry ==
=== Synthesis ===
The chemical synthesis of 2C-T-36 has been described.

=== Analogues ===
Structure of CYB2108D, a deuterated analogue of 2C-T-36 (CYB2108).

Analogues of 2C-T-36 (2C-T-TFM) include 2C-T-21 (2C-T-FE), 2C-T-21.5 (2C-T-DFE), 2C-T-22 (2C-T-TFE), 2C-T-28 (2C-T-FP), 2C-T-35 (2C-T-DFM), 2C-T, 2C-TFM, and 2C-TFE, among others. Some other analogues include 2C-Se-TFM, trifluoromescaline (TFM), 3C-TFE (3C-trifluoroescaline), and tiflorex (flutiorex). A deuterated isotopologue, CYB2108D (2C-T-36 with fully deuterated methoxy groups at 2 and 5 positions), is known.

== History ==
Alexander Shulgin attempted to synthesise this compound in the 1990s, and mentions it in his book PiHKAL (Phenethylamines I Have Known and Loved) under the entry for 2C-T-21, but was unsuccessful in producing a key intermediate and never assigned it a 2C-T number. 2C-T-36 was ultimately first synthesised and named by Geoffrey Varty and colleagues at Irish biopharmaceutical company Helus Pharma (formerly Cybin) in 2023.

== Society and culture ==
=== Legal status ===
==== Canada ====
2C-T-36 is a controlled substance in Canada under phenethylamine blanket-ban language.

==== United States ====
The drug is not an explicitly controlled substance in the United States.

== Research ==
Other related drugs under development by Helus Pharma (formerly Cybin) include the deuterated phenethylamine HLP005 (CYB005) and the deuterated tryptamines deupsilocin (HLP003; CYB003) and deudimethyltryptamine (HLP004; CYB004).

== See also ==
- 2C (psychedelics)
- List of investigational hallucinogens and entactogens
