= 2C-T-29 =

Clinical data
- Other names: 2C-T-PARGY; 2C-T-PROPARGYL; 2,5-Dimethoxy-4-propargylthiophenethylamine; 4-Propargylthio-2,5-dimethoxyphenethylamine

Identifiers
- IUPAC name: 2-(2,5-dimethoxy-4-prop-2-ynylsulfanylphenyl)ethanamine
- PubChem CID: 169149320

Chemical and physical data
- Formula: C_{13}H_{17}NO_{2}S
- Molar mass: 251.34 g·mol^{−1}
- 3D model (JSmol): Interactive image
- SMILES: COC1=CC(=C(C=C1CCN)OC)SCC#C
- InChI: InChI=1S/C13H17NO2S/c1-4-7-17-13-9-11(15-2)10(5-6-14)8-12(13)16-3/h1,8-9H,5-7,14H2,2-3H3; Key:BWTBPZDUQOTNBE-UHFFFAOYSA-N

2C-T-29, also known as 2C-T-PARGY or 2C-T-PROPARGYL or as 4-propargylthio-2,5-dimethoxyphenethylamine, is a designer drug from the substituted phenethylamine family, which was first synthesised by Josh Hartsel and colleagues in 2024. It is a potent agonist at the serotonin receptor 5-HT_{2A} in vitro, with a binding affinity (K_{i}) of 1.3 nM and an EC_{50} of 0.67 nM, acting as a full agonist. While the closely related propylthio compound 2C-T-7 and the allylthio derivative 2C-T-16 are both known to be potent psychedelic drugs in humans, the propargylthio analogue 2C-T-29 is not known to have been tested in humans or other animals. It is a controlled substance in Canada under phenethylamine blanket-ban language.

== See also ==
- 2C (psychedelics)
- 2C-T-35
- 2C-T-TFM
- 2C-YN
