= 3C-TFE =

Clinical data
- Other names: 4-(2,2,2-Trifluoroethoxy)-3,5-dimethoxyamphetamine; 3,5-Dimethoxy-4-(2,2,2-trifluoroethoxy)amphetamine; 3C-F_{3}EM; α-Methyltrifluoroescaline; 3C-Trifluoroescaline
- Routes of administration: Oral
- Drug class: Serotonergic psychedelic; Hallucinogen
- ATC code: None

Pharmacokinetic data
- Duration of action: 15 hours

Identifiers
- IUPAC name: 1-[3,5-dimethoxy-4-(2,2,2-trifluoroethoxy)phenyl]propan-2-amine
- CAS Number: 501700-08-9
- PubChem CID: 60907903
- ChemSpider: 38642125

Chemical and physical data
- Formula: C_{13}H_{18}F_{3}NO_{3}
- Molar mass: 293.286 g·mol^{−1}
- 3D model (JSmol): Interactive image
- SMILES: CC(CC1=CC(=C(C(=C1)OC)OCC(F)(F)F)OC)N
- InChI: InChI=1S/C13H18F3NO3/c1-8(17)4-9-5-10(18-2)12(11(6-9)19-3)20-7-13(14,15)16/h5-6,8H,4,7,17H2,1-3H3; Key:UBMKSRMQBSOFBH-UHFFFAOYSA-N

3C-TFE, also known as 4-(2,2,2-trifluoroethoxy)-3,5-dimethoxyamphetamine or as α-methyltrifluoroescaline (3C-trifluoroescaline), is a psychedelic drug of the phenethylamine, amphetamine, and 3C families related to 3,4,5-trimethoxyamphetamine (TMA; 3C-M). It is a trifluorinated derivative of 3C-E. The drug's dose is 30 mg and its duration is approximately 15 hours. It shows weak but significant affinity for the serotonin 5-HT_{2A} and 5-HT_{2C} receptors (K_{i} = 1,825 nM and 1,659 nM, respectively). 3C-TFE was first described in the scientific literature by Daniel Trachsel in 2002. The pharmacology of a number of 3C drugs was studied in 2021, but 3C-TFE was not one of the included compounds. It is a controlled substance in Canada as an analogue of amphetamine.

== See also ==
- 3C (psychedelics)
- 3C-DFE
- 3C-DFM
- Trifluoroescaline (TFE)
