= 3C-DFM =

Clinical data
- Other names: 3C-Difluoromescaline; α-Methyldifluoromescaline; 4-(2,2-Difluoromethoxy)-3,5-dimethoxyamphetamine; 3,5-Dimethoxy-4-(2,2-difluoromethoxy)amphetamine; 4-Difluoromethoxy-3,5-dimethoxyamphetamine; 3,5-Dimethoxy-4-difluoromethoxyamphetamine
- Drug class: Serotonin receptor modulator; Serotonin 5-HT_{2A} receptor agonist
- ATC code: None

Identifiers
- IUPAC name: 1-[4-(difluoromethoxy)-3,5-dimethoxyphenyl]propan-2-amine
- CAS Number: 1178419-94-7
- PubChem CID: 54929188
- ChemSpider: 33248925

Chemical and physical data
- Formula: C_{12}H_{17}F_{2}NO_{3}
- Molar mass: 261.269 g·mol^{−1}
- 3D model (JSmol): Interactive image
- SMILES: CC(CC1=CC(=C(C(=C1)OC)OC(F)F)OC)N
- InChI: InChI=1S/C12H17F2NO3/c1-7(15)4-8-5-9(16-2)11(18-12(13)14)10(6-8)17-3/h5-7,12H,4,15H2,1-3H3; Key:BQVYKMZBEBFRIG-UHFFFAOYSA-N

3C-DFM, also known as 4-(2,2-difluoromethoxy)-3,5-dimethoxyamphetamine or as or as α-methyldifluoromescaline (3C-difluoromescaline), is a serotonin receptor modulator of the phenethylamine and 3C families. It is the amphetamine (α-methyl) derivative of the psychedelic drug difluoromescaline (DFM). The properties and effects of 3C-DFM in humans are unknown. The drug shows affinity for the serotonin 5-HT_{2} receptors and is known to act as an agonist of the serotonin 5-HT_{2A} and 5-HT_{2B} receptors. 3C-DFM was first described in the scientific literature by Daniel Trachsel by 2012. It is a controlled substance in Ukraine. The drug is also a controlled substance in Canada under phenethylamine blanket-ban language.

== See also ==
- 3C (psychedelics)
- 3C-DFE and 3C-TFE
