= 3C-AL =

Chemical compound

Clinical data
- Other names: 4-Allyloxy-3,5-dimethoxyamphetamine; 3,5-Dimethoxy-4-allyloxyamphetamine; α-Methylallylescaline; 3C-Allylescaline
- Routes of administration: Oral
- Drug class: Serotonin receptor modulator; Serotonin 5-HT_{2A} receptor agonist; Serotonergic psychedelic; Hallucinogen

Pharmacokinetic data
- Duration of action: 8–12 hours

Identifiers
- IUPAC name: 1-[3,5-dimethoxy-4-[(prop-2-en-1-yl)oxy]phenyl]propan-2-amine
- CAS Number: 214414-87-6
- PubChem CID: 44350107
- ChemSpider: 23206506
- ChEMBL: ChEMBL123867
- CompTox Dashboard (EPA): DTXSID50658378

Chemical and physical data
- Formula: C_{14}H_{21}NO_{3}
- Molar mass: 251.326 g·mol^{−1}
- 3D model (JSmol): Interactive image
- Melting point: 180 to 181 °C (356 to 358 °F)
- SMILES: C=CCOc1c(OC)cc(cc1OC)CC(N)C
- InChI: InChI=1S/C14H21NO3/c1-5-6-18-14-12(16-3)8-11(7-10(2)15)9-13(14)17-4/h5,8-10H,1,6-7,15H2,2-4H3; Key:ROINMNZLTKSBPR-UHFFFAOYSA-N

3C-AL, also known as 4-allyloxy-3,5-dimethoxyamphetamine or as α-methylallylescaline (3C-allylescaline), is a psychedelic drug of the phenethylamine, amphetamine, and 3C families related to 3,4,5-trimethoxyamphetamine (TMA). It is the amphetamine (3C) analogue of allylescaline.

The drug has a dose range of 15 to 30 mg orally and a duration of 8 to 12 hours. Its effects have been described as more visual than those of allylescaline.

The drug is a potent partial agonist of the serotonin 5-HT_{2A} receptor and also interacts with other serotonin receptors and targets.

The chemical synthesis of 3C-AL has been described.

3C-AL was described by Alexander Shulgin in his 1991 book PiHKAL (Phenethylamines I Have Known and Loved), but he did not synthesize or test 3C-AL. Instead, Daniel Trachsel synthesized 3C-AL in 2002 and described its properties and effects in 2013. The pharmacology of 3C-AL was studied in greater detail in 2021. It is a controlled substance in Canada under amphetamine blanket-ban language.

== See also ==
- 3C (psychedelics)
- 2C-AL
- 2C-T-16
- 3C-MAL
- 3C-P
- MALM
