= Trifluoromescaline =

Mescaline derivative

Clinical data
- Other names: TFM; 4-(Trifluoromethoxy)-3,5-dimethoxyphenethylamine; 3,5-Dimethoxy-4-(trifluoromethoxy)phenethylamine
- Routes of administration: Oral
- Drug class: Serotonin 5-HT_{2A} receptor agonist; Serotonergic psychedelic; Hallucinogen
- ATC code: None

Pharmacokinetic data
- Duration of action: 14–24 hours

Identifiers
- IUPAC name: 2-[3,5-dimethoxy-4-(trifluoromethoxy)phenyl]ethanamine
- PubChem CID: 155884836
- UNII: R4ZT3L7Y4K
- CompTox Dashboard (EPA): DTXSID101045785

Chemical and physical data
- Formula: C_{11}H_{14}F_{3}NO_{3}
- Molar mass: 265.232 g·mol^{−1}
- 3D model (JSmol): Interactive image
- SMILES: COc1cc(CCN)cc(OC)c1OC(F)(F)F
- InChI: InChI=1S/C11H14F3NO3/c1-16-8-5-7(3-4-15)6-9(17-2)10(8)18-11(12,13)14/h5-6H,3-4,15H2,1-2H3; Key:AVPVNYDXWCNFJD-UHFFFAOYSA-N

Trifluoromescaline (TFM), also known as 4-(trifluoromethoxy)-3,5-dimethoxyphenethylamine, is a derivative of the phenethylamine psychedelic mescaline, which has a 4-trifluoromethoxy group replacing the 4-methoxy group of mescaline.

It was found to be one of the most potent compounds in the scaline series, with a reported dose of 15 to 40 mg (and 60 mg being described as a "strong overdose"), and a slow onset of action and long duration of effects, lasting 14 to 24 hours.

The drug showed about 34-fold higher affinity and 36-fold greater activational potency at the serotonin 5-HT_{2A} receptor compared to mescaline in vitro. In addition, it appears to be much more lipophilic than mescaline (predicted log P = 1.9 vs. 0.7, respectively).

Analogues of trifluoromescaline include the fluorinated scalines difluoromescaline, metadifluoromescaline, fluoroescaline, difluoroescaline, trifluoroescaline, fluoroproscaline, and trifluoroproscaline, among others. Some other analogues include the fluorinated phenethylamines 2C-TFM, DOTFM, 2C-TFE, DOTFE, 2C-T-28 (2C-T-FP), 2C-T-36 (2C-T-TFM), and 3C-DFE, among others.

TFM was first described in the scientific literature by Daniel Trachsel by 2012. Many other related compounds have also been described by Trachsel and colleagues. It is not a controlled substance in Canada as of 2025.

== See also ==
- Scaline
