= 2C-T-9 =

Clinical data
- Other names: 4-tert-Butylthio-2,5-dimethoxyphenethylamine; 2,5-Dimethoxy-4-tert-butylthiophenethylamine
- Routes of administration: Oral
- Drug class: Serotonin 5-HT_{2A} receptor agonist; Serotonergic psychedelic; Hallucinogen
- ATC code: None

Pharmacokinetic data
- Duration of action: 12–18 hours

Identifiers
- CAS Number: 207740-28-1
- PubChem CID: 44349799
- ChemSpider: 23206245
- CompTox Dashboard (EPA): DTXSID301349216

Chemical and physical data
- Formula: C_{14}H_{23}NO_{2}S
- Molar mass: 269.40 g·mol^{−1}
- 3D model (JSmol): Interactive image
- SMILES: NCCc1cc(OC)c(cc1OC)SC(C)(C)C
- InChI: InChI=1S/C14H23NO2S/c1-14(2,3)18-13-9-11(16-4)10(6-7-15)8-12(13)17-5/h8-9H,6-7,15H2,1-5H3; Key:PSVDMTZXLJTPNX-UHFFFAOYSA-N

2C-T-9, also known as 4-tert-butylthio-2,5-dimethoxyphenethylamine, is a psychedelic drug of the phenethylamine and 2C families. It is taken orally.

== Use and effects ==
According to Alexander Shulgin in his book PiHKAL (Phenethylamines I Have Known and Loved), the dose range of 2C-T-9 is 60 to 100 mg orally and its duration is 12 to 18 hours. Its effects included impairment such that one would not feel comfortable to drive, more effects "to the body than to the head", "body energy", sleeping difficulties, and hangover. The drug did not produce psychedelic visuals. One of the reports of 2C-T-9 was rated as a "plus-three" on the Shulgin Rating Scale.

== Pharmacology ==
=== Pharmacodynamics ===
2C-T-9 has been found to act as a serotonin 5-HT_{2A} receptor agonist with modest potency (EC_{50} = 150 nM). The drug failed to produce the head-twitch response, a behavioral proxy of psychedelic effects, in rodents at the assessed dose of 3 mg/kg, which was said to parallel its known low potency in humans.

== Chemistry ==
=== Synthesis ===
The chemical synthesis of 2C-T-9 has been described.

== History ==
2C-T-9 was first described in the scientific literature by Alexander Shulgin and colleagues in 1991. This included in a journal article and in his book PiHKAL (Phenethylamines I Have Known and Loved).

== Society and culture ==
=== Legal status ===
==== Canada ====
2C-T-9 is a controlled substance in Canada under phenethylamine blanket-ban language.

== See also ==
- Substituted methoxyphenethylamine
- 2C (psychedelics)
