= 3C-E =

Psychedelic drug

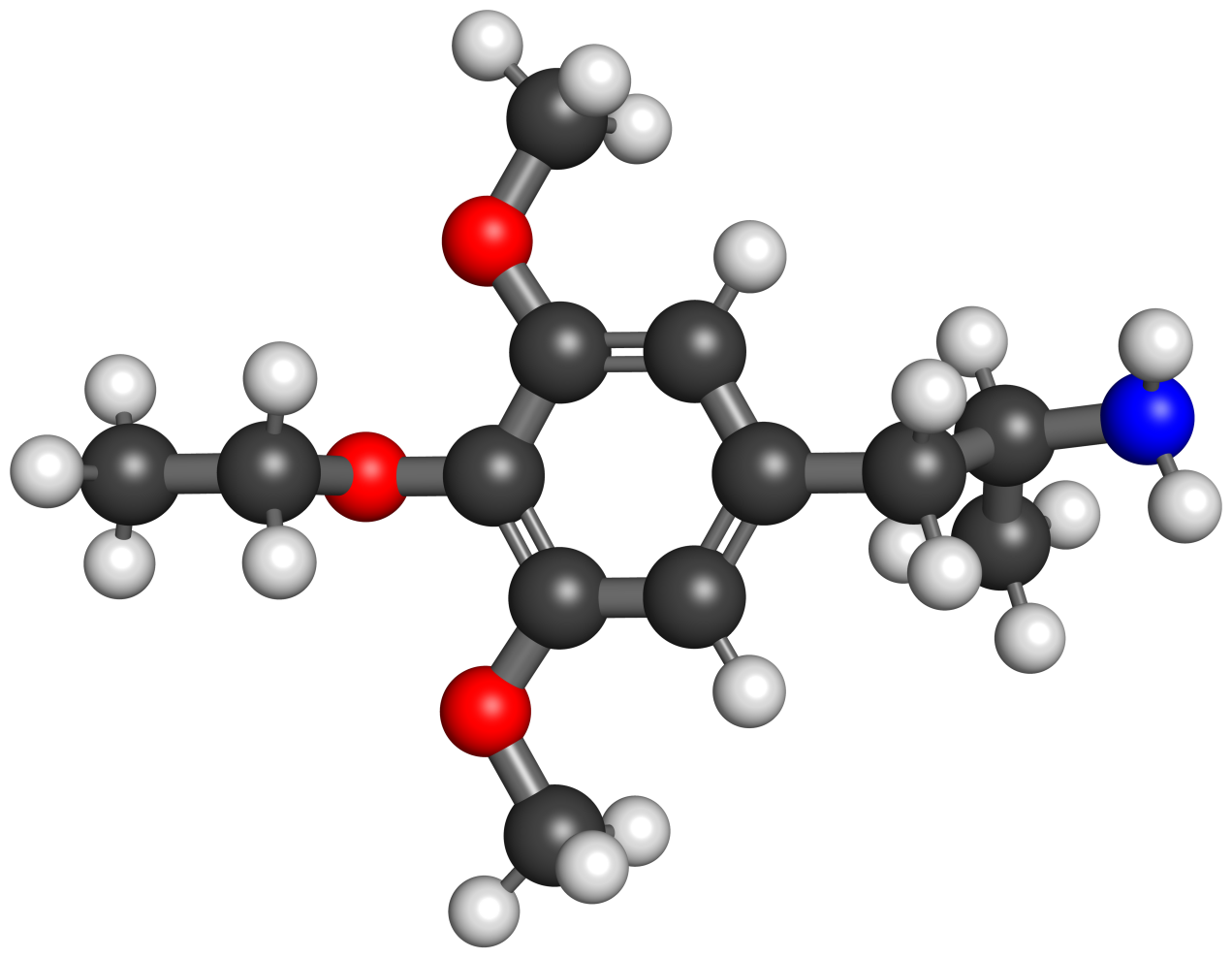

Clinical data
- Other names: 4-Ethoxy-3,5-dimethoxyamphetamine; 3,5-Dimethoxy-4-ethoxyamphetamine; α-Methylescaline; 3C-Escaline
- Routes of administration: Oral
- Drug class: Serotonin receptor modulator; Serotonin 5-HT_{2A} receptor agonist; Serotonergic psychedelic; Hallucinogen

Legal status
- Legal status: CA: Schedule I; DE: NpSG (Industrial and scientific use only); UK: Class B; US: Analogue of a Schedule I drug, possibly illegal under the Federal Analog Act

Pharmacokinetic data
- Duration of action: 8–12 hours

Identifiers
- IUPAC name: 1-(4-Ethoxy-3,5-dimethoxyphenyl)propan-2-amine
- CAS Number: 146849-92-5
- PubChem CID: 44350137
- ChemSpider: 21106237
- UNII: W9QX56V5RU
- ChEMBL: ChEMBL128038
- CompTox Dashboard (EPA): DTXSID40658382

Chemical and physical data
- Formula: C_{13}H_{21}NO_{3}
- Molar mass: 239.315 g·mol^{−1}
- 3D model (JSmol): Interactive image
- SMILES: CCOc1c(cc(cc1OC)CC(C)N)OC
- InChI: InChI=1S/C13H21NO3/c1-5-17-13-11(15-3)7-10(6-9(2)14)8-12(13)16-4/h7-9H,5-6,14H2,1-4H3; Key:AHLXCGRWNKUNTQ-UHFFFAOYSA-N

3C-E, also known as 4-ethoxy-3,5-dimethoxyamphetamine or as α-methylescaline (3C-escaline), is a psychedelic drug of the phenethylamine, amphetamine, and 3C families related to 3,4,5-trimethoxyamphetamine (TMA). It is the amphetamine (3C) analogue of escaline.

== Use and effects ==
In his book PiHKAL (Phenethylamines I Have Known and Loved) and other publications, Alexander Shulgin lists 3C-E's dose as 30 to 60 mg orally and its duration as 8 to 12 hours. Per other sources, it has an estimated typical dose of 45 mg orally. The drug has about the same potency as escaline.

The effects of 3C-E have been described as including strong visuals, closed-eye imagery like bright colors and distinct shapes, complex fantasy, strangeness, unworldliness, and unreality, an eerie state of awareness, fluctuating erotic and anti-erotic feelings, "exquisite sensitivity", heavy body discomfort, feelings of toxicity, nausea, muscle tremors, malaise, and slight teeth clenching. Shulgin concluded that it was a fascinating compound, but that it was a little too heavy on the body for most subjects.

== Pharmacology ==
=== Pharmacodynamics ===
3C-E is a potent serotonin 5-HT_{2A} receptor agonist and also interacts with other serotonin receptors and targets. It produces the head-twitch response, a behavioral proxy of psychedelic effects, in rodents.

== Chemistry ==
=== Synthesis ===
The chemical synthesis of 3C-E has been described.

=== Analogues ===
Analogues of 3C-E include TMA, MEM, 3C-FE, 3C-DFE, and 3C-TFE, among others.

== History ==
3C-E was first described in the scientific literature by Benington and colleagues in 1954. Alexander Shulgin and colleagues reported an active dose of 40 mg orally based on unpublished findings in a 1978 literature review. Subsequently, Shulgin further reported the properties and effects of 3C-E in his book PiHKAL (Phenethylamines I Have Known and Loved) in 1991. The drug was encountered as a novel designer drug in Europe in 2013.

== Society and culture ==
=== Legal status ===
==== Canada ====
It is a controlled substance in Canada under phenethylamine blanket-ban language.

== See also ==
- 3C (psychedelics)
