= 2C-T-35 =

Clinical data
- Other names: 2C-T-DFM; 4-Difluoromethylthio-2,5-dimethoxyphenethylamine

Identifiers
- IUPAC name: 2-[4-(difluoromethylsulfanyl)-2,5-dimethoxyphenyl]ethanamine
- CAS Number: 2976433-40-4
- PubChem CID: 169149411

Chemical and physical data
- Formula: C_{11}H_{15}F_{2}NO_{2}S
- Molar mass: 263.30 g·mol^{−1}
- 3D model (JSmol): Interactive image
- SMILES: COC1=CC(=C(C=C1CCN)OC)SC(F)F
- InChI: InChI=1S/C11H15F2NO2S/c1-15-8-6-10(17-11(12)13)9(16-2)5-7(8)3-4-14/h5-6,11H,3-4,14H2,1-2H3; Key:IMXLEUNJGUBEMC-UHFFFAOYSA-N

2C-T-35, also known as 2C-T-DFM or as 4-difluoromethylthio-2,5-dimethoxyphenethylamine, is a designer drug from the substituted phenethylamine family, which was first synthesised by Josh Hartsel and colleagues in 2024. It is a potent agonist at the serotonin receptor 5-HT_{2A} in vitro, with a binding affinity (K_{i}) of 6.3 nM. In animal studies, 2C-T-DFM was the most effective compound at producing a head-twitch response out of a series of related analogues, with an average of 33 head-twitches per 10 minutes compared to 21 for 2C-T-TFM. While it had previously been proposed as a theoretical compound, 2C-T-35 is not known to have been tested in humans. It is a controlled substance in Canada under phenethylamine blanket-ban language.

== See also ==
- 2C (psychedelics)
- 2C-T-21.5
- 2C-T-29
