= DOTFE =

Clinical data
- Other names: 4-(2,2,2-Trifluoroethyl)-2,5-dimethoxyamphetamine; 2,5-Dimethoxy-4-(2,2,2-trifluoroethyl)amphetamine
- ATC code: None

Identifiers
- IUPAC name: 1-[2,5-dimethoxy-4-(2,2,2-trifluoroethyl)phenyl]propan-2-amine
- CAS Number: 260810-06-8
- PubChem CID: 170143488

Chemical and physical data
- Formula: C_{13}H_{18}F_{3}NO_{2}
- Molar mass: 277.287 g·mol^{−1}
- 3D model (JSmol): Interactive image
- SMILES: COc1cc(CC(F)(F)F)c(cc1CC(N)C)OC
- InChI: InChI=1S/C13H18F3NO2/c1-8(17)4-9-5-12(19-3)10(6-11(9)18-2)7-13(14,15)16/h5-6,8H,4,7,17H2,1-3H3; Key:OZFGHDLWUVVAPY-UHFFFAOYSA-N

DOTFE, also known as 4-(2,2,2-trifluoroethyl)-2,5-dimethoxyamphetamine, is a drug of the phenethylamine, amphetamine, and DOx families. It is a close analogue of known psychedelics like the DOx psychedelic DOTFM and the 2C psychedelics 2C-TFE and 2C-TFM. The drug was predicted to bind to the serotonin 5-HT_{2A} receptor, with a predicted affinity (K_{i}) of 50 nM. It was inactive in humans at doses of up to 3 mg, but higher doses were not assessed. DOTFE is expected to be a potent psychedelic at active doses. It was first described in the scientific literature by at least 1999. DOTFE was evaluated in humans by Daniel Trachsel, with these reports published in 2012 and 2013.

== See also ==
- DOx (psychedelics)
