= Fluoroescaline =

Clinical data
- Other names: FE; 2-Fluoroescaline; 2-FE; FEM; 4-(2-Fluoroethoxy)-3,5-dimethoxyphenethylamine; 3,5-Dimethoxy-4-(2-fluoroethoxy)phenethylamine
- Routes of administration: Oral
- Drug class: Serotonin receptor modulator; Serotonin 5-HT_{2A} receptor agonist; Serotonergic psychedelic; Hallucinogen
- ATC code: None

Pharmacokinetic data
- Duration of action: ~6 hours

Identifiers
- IUPAC name: 2-[4-(2-fluoroethoxy)-3,5-dimethoxyphenyl]ethanamine
- CAS Number: 501700-01-2
- PubChem CID: 12970140
- ChemSpider: 36333336

Chemical and physical data
- Formula: C_{12}H_{18}FNO_{3}
- Molar mass: 243.278 g·mol^{−1}
- 3D model (JSmol): Interactive image
- SMILES: COC1=CC(=CC(=C1OCCF)OC)CCN
- InChI: InChI=1S/C12H18FNO3/c1-15-10-7-9(3-5-14)8-11(16-2)12(10)17-6-4-13/h7-8H,3-6,14H2,1-2H3; Key:RODJFRFKJSPAGG-UHFFFAOYSA-N

Fluoroescaline (FE), also known as 4-(2-fluoroethoxy)-3,5-dimethoxyphenethylamine, is a psychedelic drug of the phenethylamine and scaline families related to mescaline. It is a fluorinated derivative of escaline.

The drug is active at a dose of 75 mg or more orally and its duration is approximately 6 hours. It has not been fully tested and it produced only weak hallucinogenic effects and no closed-eye or open-eye visuals at dose of 75 mg. The drug was said to be "almost devoid of psychoactive effects", at least at the tested doses. Fluoroescaline is notably less potent than escaline.

It is a low-potency near-full agonist of the serotonin 5-HT_{2A} receptor and also interacts with other serotonin receptors and targets.

The chemical synthesis of fluoroescaline has been described.

Fluoroescaline was first described in the scientific literature by Daniel Trachsel in 2002. Its pharmacology was subsequently described in further detail in 2021. It is not a controlled substance in Canada as of 2025.

== See also ==
- Scaline
- Difluoroescaline
- Trifluoroescaline
- Difluoromescaline
- Trifluoromescaline
- Fluoroproscaline
- 3C-FE
