= MMALM =

Clinical data
- Other names: 4-Methallyloxy-2,5-dimethoxyamphetamine; 2,5-Dimethoxy-4-methallyloxyamphetamine
- Drug class: Serotonin 5-HT_{2} receptor agonist
- ATC code: None

Identifiers
- IUPAC name: 1-{2,5-dimethoxy-4-[(2-methylprop-2-en-1-yl)oxy]phenyl}propan-2-amine

Chemical and physical data
- Formula: C_{15}H_{23}NO_{3}
- Molar mass: 265.353 g·mol^{−1}
- 3D model (JSmol): Interactive image
- SMILES: COc1cc(CC(N)C)c(cc1OCC(=C)C)OC
- InChI: InChI=1S/C15H23NO3/c1-10(2)9-19-15-8-13(17-4)12(6-11(3)16)7-14(15)18-5/h7-8,11H,1,6,9,16H2,2-5H3; Key:FKOOHEYOIKURNB-UHFFFAOYSA-N

MMALM, also known as 4-methallyloxy-2,5-dimethoxyamphetamine, is a serotonin receptor modulator of the phenethylamine, amphetamine, and DOx families. It is a derivative of the DOx psychedelics TMA-2 and MEM in which the 4-position substituent has been extended. The drug is also the α-methyl or amphetamine analogue of 2C-O-3.

== Use and effects ==
The properties and effects of MMALM in humans do not appear to be known.

== Pharmacology ==
=== Pharmacodynamics ===
MMALM acts as a potent agonist of the serotonin 5-HT_{2} receptors. Its affinities (K_{i}) were 61 nM for the serotonin 5-HT_{2A} receptor and 290 nM for the serotonin 5-HT_{2C} receptor, whereas its activational potencies (EC_{50} (E_{max})) were 1.5 nM (95%) at the serotonin 5-HT_{2A} receptor and 29 nM (90%) at the serotonin 5-HT_{2B} receptor. Besides the serotonin 5-HT_{2} receptors, the drug showed little to no activity at various other assessed targets, such as the monoamine transporters. It does not appear to have been tested for psychedelic-like activity in animals.

== History ==
MMALM was first described in the scientific literature by Daniel Trachsel in 2013. Subsequently, it was characterized in more detail by a group including Trachsel and Matthias Liechti in 2019. The compound's name is said to derive from its benzene ring substituents, "methoxy methallyloxy methoxy".

== Society and culture ==
=== Legal status ===
==== Canada ====
MMALM is a controlled substance in Canada under phenethylamine blanket-ban language.

== See also ==
- DOx (psychedelics)
- MEM § Derivatives
- Methallylescaline
- 2C-T-3
- 3C-MAL
