= 2C-T-25 =

Clinical data
- Other names: 4-Isobutylthio-2,5-dimethoxyphenethylamine; 4-iBuS-2,5-DMPEA
- Routes of administration: Oral
- Drug class: Serotonin receptor modulator; Serotonin 5-HT_{2A} receptor agonist
- ATC code: None

Pharmacokinetic data
- Duration of action: Unknown

Identifiers
- IUPAC name: 2-[2,5-dimethoxy-4-(2-methylpropylsulfanyl)phenyl]ethanamine
- PubChem CID: 12063260
- ChemSpider: 67168652

Chemical and physical data
- Formula: C_{14}H_{23}NO_{2}S
- Molar mass: 269.40 g·mol^{−1}
- 3D model (JSmol): Interactive image
- SMILES: CC(C)CSC1=C(C=C(C(=C1)OC)CCN)OC
- InChI: InChI=1S/C14H23NO2S/c1-10(2)9-18-14-8-12(16-3)11(5-6-15)7-13(14)17-4/h7-8,10H,5-6,9,15H2,1-4H3; Key:OEPKQBQEDYEXMC-UHFFFAOYSA-N

2C-T-25, also known as 4-isobutylthio-2,5-dimethoxyphenethylamine, is a serotonin receptor modulator of the phenethylamine and 2C families. It shows affinity for serotonin receptors and other targets and acts as a potency partial agonist of the serotonin 5-HT_{2A} and 5-HT_{2B} receptors. The dose of 2C-T-25 in humans is unknown. Daniel Trachsel reported that 2C-T-25 was inactive at doses of up to 30 mg orally. The drug was first described in the scientific literature by Trachsel in 2003 and was subsequently described further by Trachsel and colleagues in 2013 and 2018. It is a controlled substance in Canada under phenethylamine blanket-ban language.

== See also ==
- 2C (psychedelics)
