= 3C-DFE =

Psychedelic drug

Clinical data
- Other names: 3C-F_{2}EM; 4-(2,2-Difluoroethoxy)-3,5-dimethoxyamphetamine; α-Methyldifluoroescaline; 3C-Difluoroescaline
- Routes of administration: Oral
- Drug class: Serotonin receptor modulator; Serotonergic psychedelic; Hallucinogen
- ATC code: None

Pharmacokinetic data
- Duration of action: ~10 hours

Identifiers
- IUPAC name: 1-[4-(2,2-difluoroethoxy)-3,5-dimethoxyphenyl]propan-2-amine
- CAS Number: 501700-07-8
- PubChem CID: 54939285
- ChemSpider: 33260397
- UNII: PGR2KX4G54
- CompTox Dashboard (EPA): DTXSID701032726

Chemical and physical data
- Formula: C_{13}H_{19}F_{2}NO_{3}
- Molar mass: 275.296 g·mol^{−1}
- 3D model (JSmol): Interactive image
- Melting point: 171 to 172 °C (340 to 342 °F)
- SMILES: COc1cc(CC(N)C)cc(OC)c1OCC(F)F
- InChI: InChI=1S/C13H19F2NO3/c1-8(16)4-9-5-10(17-2)13(11(6-9)18-3)19-7-12(14)15/h5-6,8,12H,4,7,16H2,1-3H3; Key:TYXHBMNQOVLYRX-UHFFFAOYSA-N

3C-DFE, also known as 4-(2,2-difluoroethoxy)-3,5-dimethoxyamphetamine or as α-methyldifluoroescaline (3C-difluoroescaline), is a lesser-known psychedelic drug of the phenethylamine, amphetamine, and 3C families, which is a fluorinated derivative of 3C-E. It was first synthesised by Daniel Trachsel in 2002, and has been reported as showing similar psychedelic activity to related compounds, with an active dose of around 22 mg orally and a duration of approximately 10 hours.

Despite its psychedelic activity, binding studies in vitro showed 3C-DFE to have a surprisingly weak binding affinity of 2,695 nM at the serotonin 5-HT_{2A} receptor with negligible affinity at the serotonin 5-HT_{2C} receptor, making it only slightly higher affinity than mescaline, despite its much higher potency in vivo. However, the pharmacology of 3C-DFE was subsequently further studied and it was found to be a potent agonist of the serotonin 5-HT_{2A} receptor, with an EC_{50} of 120 nM (83-fold that of mescaline in the same study) and an E_{max} of 95% (relative to 56% with mescaline in the study).

It is a controlled substance in Canada under phenethylamine blanket-ban language.

== See also ==
- 3C (psychedelics)
- 3C-TFE
- 3C-DFM
- 2C-TFE
- Escaline
- DOTFM
- 2C-T-21
- 2C-T-21.5
- 2C-T-28
- Trifluoromescaline
