= DOYN =

Clinical data
- Other names: 4-Ethynyl-2,5-dimethoxyamphetamine; 2,5-Dimethoxy-4-ethynylamphetamine
- Routes of administration: Oral
- Drug class: Serotonergic psychedelic; Hallucinogen
- ATC code: None

Pharmacokinetic data
- Duration of action: 10–15 hours

Identifiers
- IUPAC name: 1-(4-ethynyl-2,5-dimethoxyphenyl)propan-2-amine
- CAS Number: 633290-70-7
- PubChem CID: 171652344

Chemical and physical data
- Formula: C_{13}H_{17}NO_{2}
- Molar mass: 219.284 g·mol^{−1}
- 3D model (JSmol): Interactive image
- SMILES: COc1cc(C#C)c(cc1CC(N)C)OC
- InChI: InChI=1S/C13H17NO2/c1-5-10-7-13(16-4)11(6-9(2)14)8-12(10)15-3/h1,7-9H,6,14H2,2-4H3; Key:XSBAOBBZMYENRL-UHFFFAOYSA-N

DOYN, also known as 4-ethynyl-2,5-dimethoxyamphetamine, is a serotonergic psychedelic of the phenethylamine, amphetamine, and DOx families. According to Daniel Trachsel, it produces hallucinogenic effects with a dose range of 2 to 6 mg orally and a duration of 10 to 15 hours. The drug's effects are described as typical psychedelic effects including fantasy, imagery, and visuals. It is described as having a relatively short duration compared to 4-alkyl DOx derivatives like DOM, perhaps due to more rapid metabolism. DOYN was first mentioned in the scientific literature by Trachsel in 2003 and was then described in more depth by him in 2013. It is a controlled substance in Canada under phenethylamine blanket-ban language.

== See also ==
- DOx
- 2C-YN
