= Metadifluoromescaline =

Clinical data
- Other names: MDFM; 3-(Difluoromethoxy)-4,5-dimethoxyphenylethylamine; 3,4-Dimethoxy-5-(difluoromethoxy)phenethylamine
- Routes of administration: Oral
- Drug class: Serotonin receptor modulator; Serotonin 5-HT_{2A} receptor agonist; Serotonergic psychedelic; Hallucinogen
- ATC code: None

Identifiers
- IUPAC name: 2-[3-(difluoromethoxy)-4,5-dimethoxyphenyl]ethan-1-amine

Chemical and physical data
- Formula: C_{11}H_{15}F_{2}NO_{3}
- Molar mass: 247.242 g·mol^{−1}
- 3D model (JSmol): Interactive image
- SMILES: NCCc1cc(OC(F)F)c(c(c1)OC)OC
- InChI: InChI=1S/C11H15F2NO3/c1-15-8-5-7(3-4-14)6-9(10(8)16-2)17-11(12)13/h5-6,11H,3-4,14H2,1-2H3; Key:MGKIHHYUCREKFM-UHFFFAOYSA-N

Metadifluoromescaline (MDFM), also known as 3-(difluoromethoxy)-4,5-dimethoxyphenylethylamine, is a psychedelic drug of the phenethylamine and scaline families related to mescaline. It is a difluorinated derivative of mescaline. It has a dose of 85 mg or more orally and a duration of approximately 8 hours. The drug is described as being slightly more potent than mescaline. However, it is said to produce some rather unpleasant effects at the highest assessed dose of 85 mg, including physical discomfort, listlessness in the days after taking the drug, and a practical absence of hallucinogenic effects at this dose. MDFM is a partial agonist of the serotonin 5-HT_{2A} receptor and also interacts with other serotonin receptors and targets. It was first described in the scientific literature by Daniel Trachsel in 2012. Subsequently, its pharmacology was studied in greater detail in 2021. It is not a controlled substance in Canada as of 2025.

== See also ==
- Scaline
- Difluoromescaline
- Trifluoromescaline
- Difluoroescaline
