= Trifluoroescaline =

Clinical data
- Other names: TFE; 3,3,3-Trifluoroescaline; 3,3,3-TFE; F_{3}EM; 4-(2,2,2-Trifluoroethoxy)-3,5-dimethoxyphenethylamine; 3,5-Dimethoxy-4-(2,2,2-trifluoroethoxy)phenethylamine
- Routes of administration: Oral
- Drug class: Serotonin receptor modulator; Serotonin 5-HT_{2A} receptor agonist; Serotonergic psychedelic; Hallucinogen
- ATC code: None

Pharmacokinetic data
- Duration of action: 12–18 hours

Identifiers
- IUPAC name: 2-[3,5-dimethoxy-4-(2,2,2-trifluoroethoxy)phenyl]ethanamine
- CAS Number: 501700-03-4
- PubChem CID: 54930645
- ChemSpider: 33250351

Chemical and physical data
- Formula: C_{12}H_{16}F_{3}NO_{3}
- Molar mass: 279.259 g·mol^{−1}
- 3D model (JSmol): Interactive image
- SMILES: COC1=CC(=CC(=C1OCC(F)(F)F)OC)CCN
- InChI: InChI=1S/C12H16F3NO3/c1-17-9-5-8(3-4-16)6-10(18-2)11(9)19-7-12(13,14)15/h5-6H,3-4,7,16H2,1-2H3; Key:LMULYKOEWFMASK-UHFFFAOYSA-N

Trifluoroescaline (TFE), also known as 4-(2,2,2-trifluoroethoxy)-3,5-dimethoxyphenethylamine, is a psychedelic drug of the phenethylamine and scaline families related to mescaline. It is a trifluorinated derivative of escaline.

The drug has a dose range of 35 to 65 mg orally and a duration of 12 to 18 hours. It has similar potency to escaline, greatly increased potency relative to mescaline, and a prolonged duration compared to both mescaline and escaline. The effects of trifluoroescaline have been reported to include enhanced fantasy, strong closed-eye visuals, significant open-eye visuals, and low body load.

The drug is a low-potency partial agonist of the serotonin 5-HT_{2A} receptor and also interacts with other serotonin receptors and targets.

The chemical synthesis of trifluoroescaline has been described.

Trifluoroescaline was first described in the scientific literature by Daniel Trachsel in 2002. Its pharmacology was studied in more detail in 2021. It is not a controlled substance in Canada as of 2025.

== See also ==
- Scaline
- Trifluoromescaline
- Trifluoroproscaline
- Difluoroescaline
- Fluoroescaline
- Difluoromescaline
- Fluoroproscaline
- 3C-TFE
