= 3C-FP =

Clinical data
- Other names: 4-(3-Fluoropropoxy)-3,5-dimethoxyamphetamine; 3,5-Dimethoxy-4-(3-fluoropropoxy)amphetamine; α-Methylfluoroproscaline; 3C-Fluoroproscaline
- Routes of administration: Oral
- Drug class: Serotonin receptor modulator; Serotonin 5-HT_{2A} receptor agonist; Serotonergic psychedelic; Hallucinogen
- ATC code: None

Pharmacokinetic data
- Duration of action: ~8 hours

Identifiers
- IUPAC name: 1-[4-(3-fluoropropoxy)-3,5-dimethoxyphenyl]propan-2-amine
- PubChem CID: 81113412
- ChemSpider: 36606283

Chemical and physical data
- Formula: C_{14}H_{22}FNO_{3}
- Molar mass: 271.332 g·mol^{−1}
- 3D model (JSmol): Interactive image
- SMILES: CC(CC1=CC(=C(C(=C1)OC)OCCCF)OC)N
- InChI: InChI=1S/C14H22FNO3/c1-10(16)7-11-8-12(17-2)14(13(9-11)18-3)19-6-4-5-15/h8-10H,4-7,16H2,1-3H3; Key:AKWFBZJFCPKTRW-UHFFFAOYSA-N

3C-FP, also known as 4-(3-fluoropropoxy)-3,5-dimethoxyamphetamine or as α-methylfluoroproscaline (3C-fluoroproscaline), is a psychedelic drug of the phenethylamine, amphetamine, and 3C families related to TMA (3,4,5-TMA). It is the amphetamine (α-methyl) derivative of fluoroproscaline (FP).

According to Daniel Trachsel, 3C-FP's dose is 25 mg or more orally and its duration is approximately 8 hours. The specific effects of 3C-FP were not described.

The receptor interactions of 3C-FP have been studied. It shows affinity for the serotonin 5-HT_{2A} and 5-HT_{2C} receptors (K_{i} = 2,600–4,581 nM and 4,400 nM) and is a potent partial agonist of the serotonin 5-HT_{2A} receptor (EC_{50} = 57 nM; E_{max} = 62%) but not of the serotonin 5-HT_{2B} receptor (EC_{50} = >10,000 nM).

The chemical synthesis of 3C-FP has been described.

3C-FP was first described in the scientific literature by Trachsel in 2002. Subsequently, its pharmacology as well as its properties in humans were reported by Trachsel and colleagues in 2012, 2013, and 2021.

== See also ==
- 3C (psychedelics)
