= 3C-MAL =

Chemical compound

Clinical data
- Other names: 4-Methylallyloxy-3,5-dimethoxyamphetamine; 3,5-Dimethoxy-4-methylallyloxyamphetamine; α-Methylmethallylescaline; α-Methyl-MAL; 3C-Methallylescaline
- Routes of administration: Unknown

Pharmacokinetic data
- Duration of action: Unknown

Identifiers
- IUPAC name: 1-[3,5-dimethoxy-4-(2-methylprop-2-enoxy)phenyl]propan-2-amine
- CAS Number: 501700-11-4
- PubChem CID: 54929000
- ChemSpider: 33248744
- UNII: 4KRX4MHV7L
- CompTox Dashboard (EPA): DTXSID501336786

Chemical and physical data
- Formula: C_{15}H_{23}NO_{3}
- Molar mass: 265.353 g·mol^{−1}
- 3D model (JSmol): Interactive image
- Melting point: 159 to 160 °C (318 to 320 °F)
- SMILES: CC(CC1=CC(=C(C(=C1)OC)OCC(=C)C)OC)N
- InChI: InChI=1S/C15H23NO3/c1-10(2)9-19-15-13(17-4)7-12(6-11(3)16)8-14(15)18-5/h7-8,11H,1,6,9,16H2,2-5H3; Key:PUSUEDYGABXNSF-UHFFFAOYSA-N

3C-MAL, also known as 4-methylallyloxy-3,5-dimethoxyamphetamine or as α-methylmethallylescaline (3C-methallylescaline), is a chemical compound of the phenethylamine, amphetamine, and 3C families related to the psychedelic drug 3,4,5-trimethoxyamphetamine (TMA). It is the amphetamine (3C) analogue of the psychedelic methallylescaline (MAL). The compound does not appear to have been tested in humans, and its dose, duration, and effects are unknown. Its chemical synthesis has been described. 3C-MAL was first described in the scientific literature by Daniel Trachsel in 2002. It is a controlled substance in Canada under Amphetamine blanket-ban language.

== See also ==
- 3C (psychedelics)
- 2C-T-3
- 3C-AL
- 3C-P
- MMALM
