= Daniel Trachsel =

Swiss chemist

- Education: Burgdorf University of Applied Sciences
- Occupation: Medicinal chemist
- Years active: 1993–present
- Organization(s): ReseaChem GmbH, MindShift
- Known for: Work on psychedelics and other psychoactive drugs
- Notable work: Psychedelische Chemie Aspekte Psychoaktiver Moleküle (2000); Phenethylamine: von der Struktur zur Funktion (2013)
- Website: https://nachtschatten.ch/autoren/trachsel/

Daniel Trachsel is a Swiss medicinal chemist who is known for working in the pharmaceutical industry and for studying and developing numerous psychedelics and other psychoactive drugs.

== Biography ==
Trachsel studied chemistry at the Burgdorf University of Applied Sciences. He became interested in psychoactive drugs in 1993, which coincided with the start of his training as a chemist.

Trachsel published his first book, Psychedelische Chemie Aspekte Psychoaktiver Moleküle (Psychedelic Chemistry: Aspects of Psychoactive Molecules), in 2000, which has undergone several revisions. He also published the book Phenethylamine: Von der Struktur zur Funktion (Phenethylamines: From Structure to Function), co-authored with David Lehmann and Christoph Enzensperger, in 2013. According to Hamilton Morris and Nick Cozzi in mid-2023, this book is in the process of being translated into English. It is being translated by the Alexander Shulgin Research Institute (ASRI), with tentative publication by Transform Press, and is also independently being translated by chemist David Carlson.

Trachsel worked as a medicinal chemist at a biopharmaceutical company starting in 2002, including in areas like renin inhibitors and orexin receptor antagonists. He is the head of chemistry at ReseaChem GmbH, a chemical research laboratory, in Burgdorf, Switzerland. In addition to his books and papers, Trachsel has published various patents, including many on psychedelics with Matthias Liechti and others that have been assigned to Mind Medicine (now Definium Therapeutics).

Trachsel has developed and published on a large number of novel psychedelic and entactogen compounds, including their psychoactive effects. This has been in a manner similar to that of the psychedelic chemist Alexander Shulgin, which has caused Trachsel to sometimes be referred to as the "German Shulgin". However, unlike Shulgin, Trachsel has publicly distanced himself from self-experimentation. Trachsel has especially studied fluorinated and other phenethylamines, for instance the mescaline derivative trifluoromescaline (TFM), among many others.

== Compounds ==
Compounds that were first synthesized, tested in humans, and/or reported by Trachsel and colleagues include:

- 2Cs
  - 2C-B-AN
  - 2C-BI-8
  - 2C-CN
  - 2C-cP
  - 2C-DB
  - 2C-EF
  - 2C-O-x (various)
  - 2C-Ph (2C-BI-1)
  - 2C-T-3 (2C-T-20)
  - 2C-T-16
  - 2C-T-19
  - 2C-T-21.5
  - 2C-T-22
  - 2C-T-25
  - 2C-T-27
  - 2C-T-28
  - 2C-T-30
  - 2C-T-31
  - 2C-T-32
  - 2C-T-33
  - 2C-tBu
  - 2C-TFE
  - 2C-V
  - 2C-YN
- DOx
  - DODB
  - DOPF
  - DOTFE
  - DOTFM
  - DOYN
  - MALM
  - MDFEM
  - MFEM
  - MIPM
  - MMALM
  - MTFEM
  - N-Methyl-DOET
- 4Cs
  - 4C-B
- Scalines
  - 2-Methylmescaline
  - 2,6-Dimethylmescaline
  - Cycloproscaline (CP)
  - Difluoroescaline (DFE)
  - Difluoromescaline (DFM)
  - Fluoroescaline (FE)
  - Fluoroproscaline (FP)
  - Isobuscaline (IB)
  - Metadifluoromescaline (MDFM)
  - Phescaline
  - Tomscaline
  - Trifluoroescaline (TFE)
  - Trifluoromescaline (TFM)
  - Trifluoroproscaline (TFP)
- Desoxyscalines
  - Desoxybromoscaline (DBR)
  - Others
- 3Cs
  - 2-Bromo-TMA
  - 3C-AL
  - 3C-DFE
  - 3C-FE
  - 3C-FP
  - 3C-MAL
  - 3C-P
  - 3C-TFE
- ψ-Phenethylamines
  - 2,4,6-TMPEA (ψ-2C-O)
  - ψ-2C-DFMO
  - ψ-DODFMO
- BOx and related
  - BMB
  - BOED
  - BOHB
- N-Benzylphenethylamines
  - NBOMe-mescaline
- MDxx
  - 3C-BOH
  - 6-Chloro-MDA
  - 6-Methyl-MDA
  - DFMDA (F2-MDA)
  - DFMDMA (F2-MDMA)
- Lysergamides
  - CYP-LAD (TRALA-22)
  - TRALA-12 (likely didehydro-LSD or DDH-LSD)
  - Others

== Selected publications ==
=== Books ===
- Trachsel, D.; Richard, N. (2000). Psychedelische Chemie Aspekte Psychoaktiver Moleküle [Psychedelic Chemistry: Aspects of Psychoactive Molecules] (in German) (1 ed.). Nachtschatten-Verlag. ISBN 978-3-907080-53-5. OCLC 247657972. Archived from the original on 18 October 2025. [Note: There are also several subsequent editions (2nd (2002) through 5th (2016)).]
- Trachsel, D.; Lehmann, D.; Enzensperger, C. (2013). Phenethylamine: von der Struktur zur Funktion [Phenethylamines: From Structure to Function]. Nachtschatten-Science (in German) (1 ed.). Solothurn: Nachtschatten-Verlag. ISBN 978-3-03788-700-4. OCLC 858805226. Archived from the original on 21 August 2025.

=== Papers ===
- Trachsel, Daniel (2002). "Synthese von neuen (Phenylalkyl)aminen zur Untersuchung von Struktur-Aktivitätsbeziehungen, Mitteilung 1, Mescalin Derivate" [Synthesis of new (phenylalkyl)amines for the investigation of structure-activity relationships, Communication 1, Mescaline derivatives] (PDF). Helvetica Chimica Acta. 85 (9): 3019–3026. doi:10.1002/1522-2675(200209)85:9<3019::AID-HLCA3019>3.0.CO;2-4.
- Trachsel, Daniel (2003). "Synthese von neuen (Phenylalkyl)aminen zur Untersuchung von Struktur–Aktivitätsbeziehungen. Mitteilung 2: 4-Thio-substituierte [2-(2,5-Dimethoxyphenyl)ethyl]amine (=2,5-Dimethoxybenzolethanamine)" [Synthesis of new (phenylalkyl)amines for the investigation of structure–activity relationships. Communication 2: 4-thio-substituted [2-(2,5-dimethoxyphenyl)ethyl]amines (=2,5-dimethoxybenzenethanamines)]. Helvetica Chimica Acta. 86 (7): 2610–2619. doi:10.1002/hlca.200390210. ISSN 0018-019X.
- Trachsel, Daniel (2003). "Synthesis of Novel (Phenylalkyl)amines for the Investigation of Structure–Activity Relationships, Part 3: 4-Ethynyl-2,5-dimethoxyphenethylamine (=4-Ethynyl-2,5-dimethoxybenzeneethanamine; 2C-YN)". Helvetica Chimica Acta. 86 (8): 2754–2759. doi:10.1002/hlca.200390224. ISSN 0018-019X.
- Trachsel D, Hadorn M, Baumberger F (March 2006). "Synthesis of fluoro analogues of 3,4-(methylenedioxy)amphetamine (MDA) and its derivatives". Chem Biodivers. 3 (3): 326–336. doi:10.1002/cbdv.200690035. PMID 17193269.
- Trachsel D, Nichols DE, Kidd S, Hadorn M, Baumberger F (May 2009). "4-aryl-substituted 2,5-dimethoxyphenethylamines: synthesis and serotonin 5-HT(2A) receptor affinities". Chem Biodivers. 6 (5): 692–704. doi:10.1002/cbdv.200800235. PMID 19479848.
- Trachsel D (2012). "Fluorine in psychedelic phenethylamines". Drug Test Anal. 4 (7–8): 577–590. doi:10.1002/dta.413. PMID 22374819.
- Luethi D, Trachsel D, Hoener MC, Liechti ME (May 2018). "Monoamine receptor interaction profiles of 4-thio-substituted phenethylamines (2C-T drugs)" (PDF). Neuropharmacology. 134 (Pt A): 141–148. doi:10.1016/j.neuropharm.2017.07.012. PMID 28720478.
- Kolaczynska KE, Luethi D, Trachsel D, Hoener MC, Liechti ME (2021). "Receptor Interaction Profiles of 4-Alkoxy-3,5-Dimethoxy-Phenethylamines (Mescaline Derivatives) and Related Amphetamines" (PDF). Front Pharmacol. 12 794254. doi:10.3389/fphar.2021.794254. PMC 8865417. PMID 35222010.
- Halberstadt AL, Luethi D, Hoener MC, Trachsel D, Brandt SD, Liechti ME (January 2023). "Use of the head-twitch response to investigate the structure-activity relationships of 4-thio-substituted 2,5-dimethoxyphenylalkylamines" (PDF). Psychopharmacology (Berl). 240 (1): 115–126. doi:10.1007/s00213-022-06279-2. PMC 9816194. PMID 36477925.
- Kolaczynska, Karolina E.; Trachsel, Daniel; Hoener, Marius C.; Liechti, Matthias E.; Luethi, Dino (20 November 2025). "Receptor interaction profiles of 4-alkoxy-2,6-dimethoxyphenethylamines (Ψ derivatives) and related amphetamines". Frontiers in Pharmacology. 16 1703480. doi:10.3389/fphar.2025.1703480. ISSN 1663-9812. PMC 12675387. PMID 41357866.
- Stoeckmann, O.V.; Ostertag, S.; Trachsel, D.; Liechti, M.E.; Rudin, D. (2026). "Scalines: novel mescaline analogues targeting 5-HT2A, 5-HT2B, 5-HT2C, and 5-HT1A receptors". Neuroscience Applied. 5 106565. doi:10.1016/j.nsa.2025.106565.

== See also ==
- List of psychedelic chemists
