= Difluoromescaline =

Clinical data
- Other names: DFM; 4-Difluoromethoxy-3,5-dimethoxyphenethylamine; 3,5-Dimethoxy-4-difluoromethoxyphenethylamine
- Routes of administration: Oral
- Drug class: Serotonin receptor modulator; Serotonin 5-HT_{2A} receptor agonist; Serotonergic psychedelic; Hallucinogen
- ATC code: None

Pharmacokinetic data
- Duration of action: 12–18 hours

Identifiers
- IUPAC name: 2-[4-(difluoromethoxy)-3,5-dimethoxyphenyl]ethanamine
- CAS Number: 1178367-63-9
- PubChem CID: 54930734
- ChemSpider: 33250437

Chemical and physical data
- Formula: C_{11}H_{15}F_{2}NO_{3}
- Molar mass: 247.242 g·mol^{−1}
- 3D model (JSmol): Interactive image
- SMILES: COC1=CC(=CC(=C1OC(F)F)OC)CCN
- InChI: InChI=1S/C11H15F2NO3/c1-15-8-5-7(3-4-14)6-9(16-2)10(8)17-11(12)13/h5-6,11H,3-4,14H2,1-2H3; Key:MMARNDCKXDBJES-UHFFFAOYSA-N

Difluoromescaline (DFM), also known as 4-difluoromethoxy-3,5-dimethoxyphenethylamine, is a psychedelic drug of the phenethylamine and scaline families related to mescaline. It is a difluorinated derivative of mescaline.

The drug's dose range is 50 to 100 mg orally and its duration is 12 to 18 hours. It is about 3- or 4-fold more potent than mescaline and has a longer duration in comparison. The drug is said to produce strong psychedelic effects.

Difluoromescaline interacts with serotonin receptors and acts as a low-potency full agonist of the serotonin 5-HT_{2A} receptor.

It was first described in the scientific literature by Daniel Trachsel in 2012. The drug's pharmacology was studied in more detail in 2021. It is not a controlled substance in Canada as of 2025.

== See also ==
- Scaline
- Metadifluoromescaline
- Trifluoromescaline
- Difluoroescaline
- Trifluoroescaline
- Fluoroescaline
- Fluoroproscaline
- Trifluoroproscaline
- 3C-DFM
