= 3C-FE =

Clinical data
- Other names: 4-(2-Fluoroethoxy)-3,5-dimethoxyamphetamine; 3C-FEM; 3C-Fluoroescaline
- Routes of administration: Unknown
- Drug class: Serotonin receptor modulator; Serotonin 5-HT_{2A} receptor agonist
- ATC code: None

Pharmacokinetic data
- Duration of action: Unknown

Identifiers
- IUPAC name: 1-[4-(2-fluoroethoxy)-3,5-dimethoxyphenyl]propan-2-amine
- PubChem CID: 12970138
- ChemSpider: 47467901

Chemical and physical data
- Formula: C_{13}H_{20}FNO_{3}
- Molar mass: 257.305 g·mol^{−1}
- 3D model (JSmol): Interactive image
- SMILES: CC(CC1=CC(=C(C(=C1)OC)OCCF)OC)N
- InChI: InChI=1S/C13H20FNO3/c1-9(15)6-10-7-11(16-2)13(18-5-4-14)12(8-10)17-3/h7-9H,4-6,15H2,1-3H3; Key:BILSAOCOBOYWEO-UHFFFAOYSA-N

3C-FE, also known as 4-(2-fluoroethoxy)-3,5-dimethoxyamphetamine or as 3C-fluoroescaline, is a serotonin receptor modulator of the phenethylamine, amphetamine, and 3C families. It is the amphetamine (α-methyl) derivative of the psychedelic drug fluoroescaline (FE).

According to Daniel Trachsel in his book Phenethylamine: von der Struktur zur Funktion and other publications, 3C-FE is inactive at doses of up to 24 mg orally, but has not been sufficiently investigated. Hence, its properties and effects in humans remain unknown.

The drug shows weak affinity for the serotonin 5-HT_{2A} and 5-HT_{2C} receptors (K_{i} = 5,987–12,000 nM and 8,400–>10,000 nM, respectively). It is an agonist of the serotonin 5-HT_{2A} and 5-HT_{2B} receptors (EC_{50} (E_{max}) = 120 nM (102%) and 800 nM (29%), respectively).

The chemical synthesis of 3C-FE has been described.

3C-FE was first described in the scientific literature by Daniel Trachsel in 2002.

== See also ==
- 3C (psychedelics)
