= 2C-T-16 =

Psychedelic drug

Clinical data
- Other names: 2,5-Dimethoxy-4-allylthiophenethylamine; 4-Allylthio-2,5-dimethoxyphenethylamine
- Routes of administration: Oral
- Drug class: Serotonergic psychedelic; Hallucinogen
- ATC code: None

Pharmacokinetic data
- Duration of action: 4–6 hours

Identifiers
- IUPAC name: 2-{2,5-Dimethoxy-4-[(prop-2-en-1-yl)sulfanyl]phenyl}ethan-1-amine
- CAS Number: 748131-14-8 648957-42-0 (hydrochloride)
- PubChem CID: 12063256
- ChemSpider: 58191439
- UNII: CNK5SS3A5Q
- CompTox Dashboard (EPA): DTXSID301032255

Chemical and physical data
- Formula: C_{13}H_{19}NO_{2}S
- Molar mass: 253.36 g·mol^{−1}
- 3D model (JSmol): Interactive image
- Melting point: 193 to 194 °C (379 to 381 °F)
- SMILES: COc1cc(SCC=C)c(OC)cc1CCN
- InChI: InChI=1S/C13H19NO2S/c1-4-7-17-13-9-11(15-2)10(5-6-14)8-12(13)16-3/h4,8-9H,1,5-7,14H2,2-3H3; Key:BXCMEIZBXNLJKM-UHFFFAOYSA-N

2C-T-16, also known as 4-allylthio-2,5-dimethoxyphenethylamine, is a psychedelic drug. It was originally named by Alexander Shulgin as described in his book PiHKAL (Phenethylamines i Have Known And Loved), however while Shulgin began synthesis of this compound he only got as far as the nitrostyrene intermediate, and did not complete the final synthetic step. Synthesis of 2C-T-16 was finally achieved by Daniel Trachsel some years later.

== Use and effects ==
Daniel Trachsel reported 2C-T-16 as showing similar psychedelic activity to related compounds, with a dose range of 10–25 mg and a duration of 4–6 hours, making it around the same potency as the better-known saturated analogue 2C-T-7, but with a significantly shorter duration of action.

== Pharmacology ==
=== Pharmacodynamics ===
Binding studies in vitro showed 2C-T-16 to have a binding affinity of 44 nM at 5-HT_{2A} and 15 nM at 5-HT_{2C}. 2C-T-16 and related derivatives are potent partial agonists of the 5-HT_{1A}, 5-HT_{2A}, 5-HT_{2B} and 5-HT_{2C} receptors and induce a head-twitch response in mice.

== Society and culture ==
=== Legal status ===
==== Canada ====
As of October 31, 2016, 2C-T-16 is a controlled substance (Schedule III) in Canada.

== See also ==
- 2C (psychedelics)
- 2C-AL
- 2C-T-3
- 2C-T-28
- 2C-T-29
- 3C-AL
