= 2C-T-22 =

Clinical data
- Other names: 4-(2,2,2-Trifluoroethylthio)-2,5-dimethoxyphenethylamine; 2,5-Dimethoxy-4-(2,2,2-trifluoroethylthio)phenethylamine; 2C-T-TFE
- Routes of administration: Oral
- Drug class: Serotonin receptor modulator; Serotonin 5-HT_{2A} receptor agonist; Serotonergic psychedelic; Hallucinogen
- ATC code: None

Pharmacokinetic data
- Duration of action: ~6 hours

Identifiers
- IUPAC name: 2-[2,5-dimethoxy-4-(2,2,2-trifluoroethylsulfanyl)phenyl]ethanamine
- CAS Number: 214414-86-5 648957-48-6 (hydrochloride)
- PubChem CID: 12063259

Chemical and physical data
- Formula: C_{12}H_{16}F_{3}NO_{2}S
- Molar mass: 295.32 g·mol^{−1}
- 3D model (JSmol): Interactive image
- SMILES: COC1=CC(=C(C=C1CCN)OC)SCC(F)(F)F
- InChI: InChI=1S/C12H16F3NO2S/c1-17-9-6-11(19-7-12(13,14)15)10(18-2)5-8(9)3-4-16/h5-6H,3-4,7,16H2,1-2H3; Key:LDOOFVKAIHFXAR-UHFFFAOYSA-N

2C-T-22, also known as 4-(2,2,2-trifluoroethylthio)-2,5-dimethoxyphenethylamine or as 2C-T-TFE, is a psychedelic drug of the phenethylamine, 2C, and 2C-T-x families. It is closely related to 2C-T-21 (the 4-(2-fluoroethylthio) analogue and 2C-T-21.5 (the 4-(2,2-difluoroethylthio) analogue).

== Use and effects ==
2C-T-22 was briefly described by Alexander Shulgin in his book PiHKAL (Phenethylamines I Have Known and Loved) in the 2C-T-21 entry, but Shulgin only partially completed the chemical synthesis of 2C-T-22 and did not test it. Subsequently, Daniel Trachsel completed the synthesis of 2C-T-22 and defined its dose as greater than 10 mg orally and its duration as approximately 6 hours. A total dose of 5 mg plus 5 mg plus 6 mg produced the first signs of effects, but higher doses were not explored. Hence, its precise dose range remains unknown.

== Pharmacology ==
=== Pharmacodynamics ===
2C-T-22 shows affinity for the serotonin 5-HT_{2A} receptor (K_{i} = 16–102 nM) and the serotonin 5-HT_{2C} receptor (K_{i} = 28–151 nM). It has been found to be a potent partial agonist of the serotonin 5-HT_{2A} and 5-HT_{2B} receptors. Other receptor and target interactions have also been described.

== History ==
2C-T-22 was first described in the scientific literature by Shulgin in his book PiHKAL in 1991. Subsequently, Trachsel described and completed the synthesis of 2C-T-22 in 2003 and he and his colleagues defined its properties in humans in 2013.

== Society and culture ==
=== Legal status ===
==== Canada ====
2C-T-22 is a controlled substance in Canada under phenethylamine blanket-ban language.

== See also ==
- 2C (psychedelics)
