= MFEM (drug) =

Clinical data
- Other names: 4-(2-Fluoroethoxy)-2,5-dimethoxyamphetamine; 2,5-Dimethoxy-4-(2-fluoroethoxy)amphetamine
- Drug class: Serotonin receptor modulator; Serotonin 5-HT_{2A} receptor agonist
- ATC code: None

Identifiers
- IUPAC name: 1-[4-(2-fluoroethoxy)-2,5-dimethoxyphenyl]propan-2-amine

Chemical and physical data
- Formula: C_{13}H_{20}FNO_{3}
- Molar mass: 257.305 g·mol^{−1}
- 3D model (JSmol): Interactive image
- SMILES: CC(N)CC1=CC(OC)=C(OCCF)C=C1OC
- InChI: InChI=1S/C13H20FNO3/c1-9(15)6-10-7-12(17-3)13(18-5-4-14)8-11(10)16-2/h7-9H,4-6,15H2,1-3H3; Key:HCQYGRWXRUZBGI-UHFFFAOYSA-N

MFEM, also known as 4-(2-fluoroethoxy)-2,5-dimethoxyamphetamine, is a serotonin receptor modulator of the phenethylamine, amphetamine, and DOx families. It is a derivative of the DOx psychedelics TMA-2 and MEM in which the 4-position substituent has been extended. The properties and effects of MFEM in humans appear to be unknown. The drug is a partial agonist of the serotonin 5-HT_{2A} and 5-HT_{2B} receptors and also shows other receptor interactions. MFEM was first described in the scientific literature by Daniel Trachsel by 2012.

== See also ==
- DOx (psychedelics)
- MEM § Derivatives
