= 2C-T-3 =

Clinical data
- Other names: 2C-T-20; 4-Methallylthio-2,5-dimethoxyphenethylamine
- Routes of administration: Oral
- Drug class: Serotonin receptor modulator; Serotonin 5-HT_{2A} receptor agonist; Serotonergic psychedelic; Hallucinogen
- ATC code: None

Pharmacokinetic data
- Duration of action: 8–14 hours

Identifiers
- IUPAC name: 2-{2,5-dimethoxy-4-[(2-methylprop-2-en-1-yl)sulfanyl]phenyl}ethan-1-amine
- CAS Number: 724421-24-3
- PubChem CID: 12063255
- ChemSpider: 129332310
- CompTox Dashboard (EPA): DTXSID001336717

Chemical and physical data
- Formula: C_{14}H_{21}NO_{2}S
- Molar mass: 267.39 g·mol^{−1}
- 3D model (JSmol): Interactive image
- SMILES: CC(=C)CSC1=C(C=C(C(=C1)OC)CCN)OC
- InChI: InChI=1S/C14H21NO2S/c1-10(2)9-18-14-8-12(16-3)11(5-6-15)7-13(14)17-4/h7-8H,1,5-6,9,15H2,2-4H3; Key:JCDUUDQZKIXJJP-UHFFFAOYSA-N

2C-T-3, also initially numbered as 2C-T-20 and also known as 4-methallylthio-2,5-dimethoxyphenethylamine, is a lesser-known psychedelic drug related to compounds such as 2C-T-7 and 2C-T-16. It was named by Alexander Shulgin but was never made or tested by him, and was instead first synthesised by Daniel Trachsel some years later. It has a binding affinity of 11nM at 5-HT_{2A} and 40nM at 5-HT_{2C}. It is reportedly a potent psychedelic drug with an active dose in the 15–40 mg range, and a duration of action of 8–14 hours, with visual effects comparable to related drugs such as methallylescaline. 2C-T-3 is a controlled substance in Canada under phenethylamine blanket-ban language.

== See also ==
- 2C (psychedelics)
- 2C-T-2
- 2C-T-4
- 3C-MAL
