= 2C-T-28 =

Psychedelic drug

Clinical data
- Other names: 4-(3-Fluoropropylthio)-2,5-dimethoxyphenethylamine; 2C-T-FP
- Routes of administration: Oral
- Drug class: Serotonergic psychedelic; Hallucinogen
- ATC code: None

Pharmacokinetic data
- Duration of action: 8–10 hours

Identifiers
- IUPAC name: 2-[4-(3-fluoropropylsulfanyl)-2,5-dimethoxyphenyl]ethanamine
- CAS Number: 783303-41-3 648957-54-4 (hydrochloride)
- PubChem CID: 12063262
- ChemSpider: 129332309
- CompTox Dashboard (EPA): DTXSID301337019

Chemical and physical data
- Formula: C_{13}H_{20}FNO_{2}S
- Molar mass: 273.37 g·mol^{−1}
- 3D model (JSmol): Interactive image
- SMILES: COC1=CC(=C(C=C1CCN)OC)SCCCF
- InChI: InChI=1S/C13H20FNO2S/c1-16-11-9-13(18-7-3-5-14)12(17-2)8-10(11)4-6-15/h8-9H,3-7,15H2,1-2H3; Key:XAFVGDRNPGLCMI-UHFFFAOYSA-N

2C-T-28, also known as 4-(3-fluoropropylthio)-2,5-dimethoxyphenethylamine or as 2C-T-FP, is a psychedelic drug related to 2C-T-7 and 2C-T-21. It was named by Alexander Shulgin but was never made or tested by him, and was instead first synthesised by Daniel Trachsel some years later. It has a binding affinity of 75 nM at 5-HT_{2A} and 28 nM at 5-HT_{2C}. It is reportedly a potent psychedelic drug with an active dose in the 8–20 mg range, and a duration of action of 8–10 hours, with prominent visual effects. 2C-T-28 is the 3-fluoropropyl instead of 2-fluoroethyl chain-lengthened homologue of 2C-T-21 and has very similar properties, although unlike 2C-T-21 it will not form toxic fluoroacetate as a metabolite. It is a controlled substance in Canada under phenethylamine blanket-ban language.

== See also ==
- 2C (psychedelics)
- 2C-T-16
- 2C-TFE
- 3C-DFE
- DOPF
- Trifluoromescaline
- 2C-x
- DOx
- 25-NB
