= 2C-TFM =

Psychedelic drug

Clinical data
- Other names: 2C-CF_{3}; 2,5-Dimethoxy-4-trifluoromethylphenethylamine; 4-Trifluoromethyl-2,5-dimethoxyphenethylamine
- Routes of administration: Oral
- Drug class: Serotonin 5-HT_{2} receptor agonist; Serotonergic psychedelic; Hallucinogen

Pharmacokinetic data
- Duration of action: ≥5–10 hours

Identifiers
- IUPAC name: 2-[2,5-dimethoxy-4-(trifluoromethyl)phenyl]ethan-1-amine
- CAS Number: 159277-08-4
- PubChem CID: 10399795
- ChemSpider: 8575233
- UNII: 16O4G6IKYL
- ChEMBL: ChEMBL136354
- CompTox Dashboard (EPA): DTXSID70439308

Chemical and physical data
- Formula: C_{11}H_{14}F_{3}NO_{2}
- Molar mass: 249.233 g·mol^{−1}
- 3D model (JSmol): Interactive image
- Melting point: 260 °C (500 °F) (hydrochloride)
- SMILES: FC(F)(C1=C(OC)C=C(CCN)C(OC)=C1)F
- InChI: InChI=1S/C11H14F3NO2/c1-16-9-6-8(11(12,13)14)10(17-2)5-7(9)3-4-15/h5-6H,3-4,15H2,1-2H3; Key:LYXGNMLWYONZID-UHFFFAOYSA-N

2C-TFM, also known as 4-trifluoromethyl-2,5-dimethoxyphenethylamine or as 2C-CF_{3}, is a serotonin 5-HT_{2} receptor agonist and psychedelic drug of the phenethylamine and 2C families. It was first synthesized in the laboratory of David E. Nichols. Later, it was tested in humans and its psychedelic effects were confirmed. 2C-TFM is the most potent psychedelic of the 2C psychedelics.

== Use and effects ==
A psychedelic dose of 2C-TFM has been reported by Daniel Trachsel and Alexander Shulgin to be 3 to 6 mg orally. Its duration has been reported by Trachsel to be 5 to 7 hours or 6 to 10 hours or more in different publications. It is the most potent member of the 2C family.

== Pharmacology ==
=== Pharmacodynamics ===
The mechanism that produces the hallucinogenic and entheogenic effects of 2C-TFM is most likely to result from action as a 5-HT_{2A} serotonin receptor agonist in the brain, a mechanism of action shared by all of the hallucinogenic tryptamines and phenethylamines. 2C-TFM displaced radiolabelled ketanserin from 5-HT_{2A/C} receptors with a K_{i} of 74.5 nM, as compared to a K_{i} of 80.9 nM for the more well known 5-HT_{2A} agonist DOI, indicating similar binding affinity at the receptor. The high binding affinity conferred by the 4-trifluoromethyl group is demonstrated by the fact that 2C-TFM is one of the only simple phenethylamines to rival the potency of psychedelic amphetamines like DOI and DOB, in both in vitro studies and human trials.

== Chemistry ==
2C-TFM is a code that represents 4-trifluoromethyl-2,5-dimethoxyphenethylamine. The full name of the chemical is 2-[2,5-dimethoxy-4-(trifluoromethyl)phenyl]ethanamine.

=== Synthesis ===
The chemical synthesis of 2C-TFM has been described. In The Shulgin Index Volume 1: Psychedelic Phenethylamines and Related Compounds, the synthesis is written "from 2C-I (with trifluoroacetic anhydride) to 1-(2,5-dimethoxy-4-iodophenyl)-2-(trifluoroacetamido)ethane; (with methyl chlorodifluoroacetate, KF, Cul) to 1-(2,5-dimethoxy-4-trifluoromethylphenyl)-2-(trifluoroacetamido)ethane; (with KOH) to 2C-TFM." The synthesis was published by Nichols and his research team. Since 2C-TFM is usually synthesised from 2C-I and the reaction does not generally consume all of the starting material, samples of 2C-TFM are likely to be contaminated with detectable traces of unreacted 2C-I, which may pose legal issues in jurisdictions where 2C-I is illegal, even though 2C-TFM itself may not be prohibited.

=== Analogues and derivatives ===
Analogues and derivatives of 2C-TFM include 2C-TFE, 2C-T-TFM (2C-T-36; CYB210010), DOTFM, 4C-TFM, TFMFly (DOTFM-FLY), 25TFM-NBOMe, LPH-5 ((S)-2C-TFM-3PIP), and 2T-2CTFM-3PIP, among others.

== History ==
2C-TFM was first described in the scientific literature by David E. Nichols and colleagues in 1994.

== Society and culture ==
=== Legal status ===
==== Canada ====
As of October 31st, 2016, 2C-TFM is a controlled substance (Schedule III) in Canada.

==== United States ====
2C-TFM is unscheduled and uncontrolled in the United States, but possession and sales of 2C-TFM could potentially be prosecuted under the Federal Analog Act if intended for human consumption because of its structural similarities to 2C-B and 2C-T-7. However, 2C-TFM, unlike many other phenethylamines, has not been widely sold by internet retailers. In the wake of Operation Web Tryp in July 2004, the issue of possession and sales of 2C-TFM and other similar chemicals will probably be resolved in the courtroom as well the fate of this rare but unique psychedelic. There have been no reported deaths or hospitalizations from 2C-TFM.

== See also ==
- 2C (psychedelics)
