= 2C-TFE =

Clinical data
- Other names: 4-(2,2,2-Trifluoroethyl)-2,5-dimethoxyphenethylamine
- Routes of administration: Oral
- Drug class: Serotonergic psychedelic; Hallucinogen
- ATC code: None

Pharmacokinetic data
- Duration of action: 12–24 hours

Identifiers
- IUPAC name: 2-[2,5-dimethoxy-4-(2,2,2-trifluoroethyl)phenyl]ethan-1-amine
- CAS Number: 2888537-56-0
- PubChem CID: 57498513
- CompTox Dashboard (EPA): DTXSID301336578

Chemical and physical data
- Formula: C_{12}H_{16}F_{3}NO_{2}
- Molar mass: 263.260 g·mol^{−1}
- 3D model (JSmol): Interactive image
- SMILES: COC1=CC(=C(C=C1CCN)OC)CC(F)(F)F
- InChI: InChI=1S/C12H16F3NO2/c1-17-10-6-9(7-12(13,14)15)11(18-2)5-8(10)3-4-16/h5-6H,3-4,7,16H2,1-2H3; Key:DVENUPQPPXYSLN-UHFFFAOYSA-N

2C-TFE, also known as 4-(2,2,2-trifluoroethyl)-2,5-dimethoxyphenethylamine, is a lesser-known psychedelic drug of the phenethylamine and 2C families related to 2C-E and 2C-TFM. It was first synthesised by Daniel Trachsel, and is reportedly a potent psychedelic with an active dose in the 5 to 15 mg range orally, and a long duration of 12 to 24 hours. 2C-TFE is a controlled substance in Canada under phenethylamine blanket-ban language.

== See also ==
- 2C (psychedelics)
- 2C-EF
- 2C-TFM
- 2C-T-TFM
- 3C-DFE
- DOTFE
- DOTFM
- Trifluoromescaline
