= 3,4,5-Trimethoxyamphetamine =

TMA

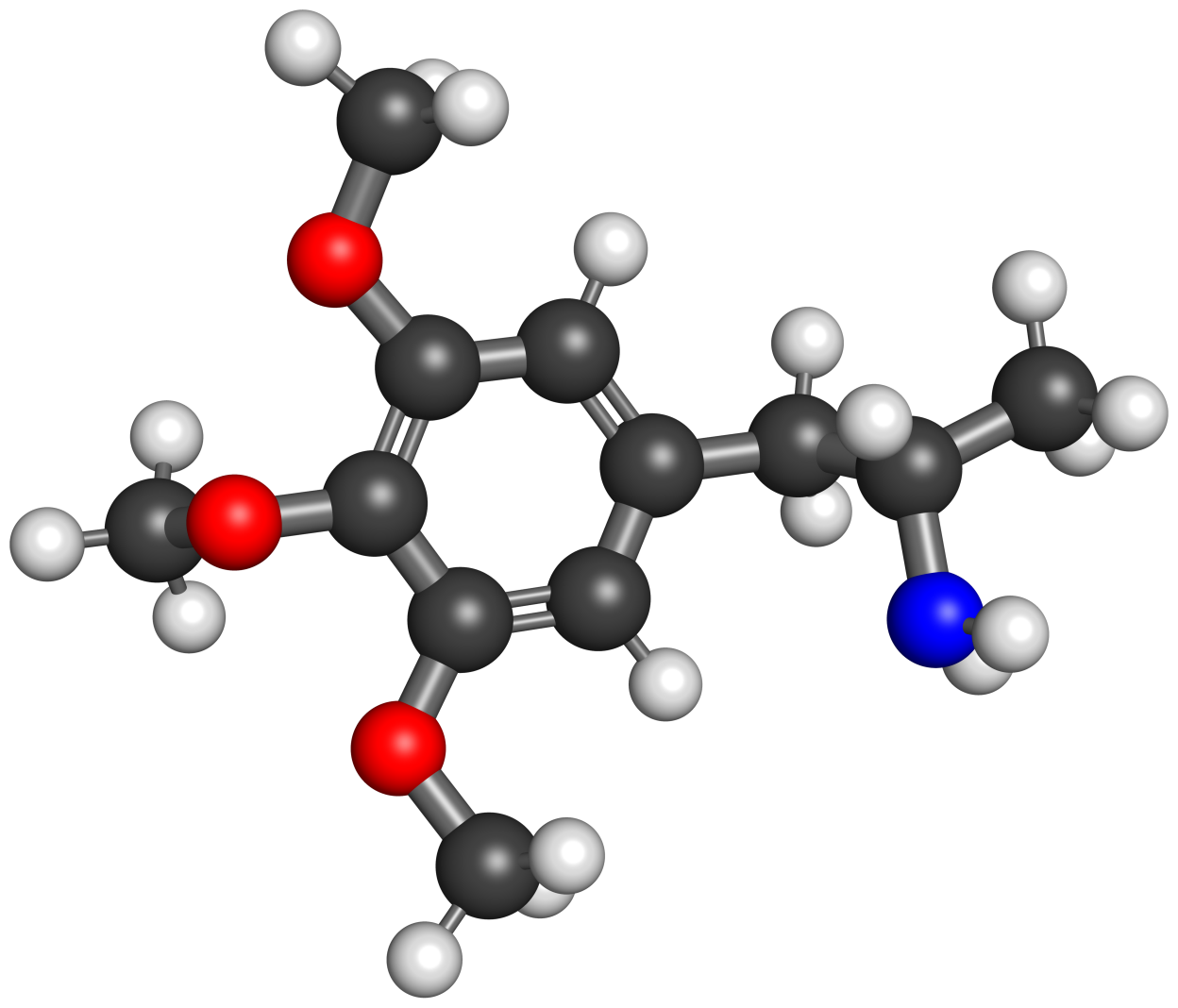

Clinical data
- Other names: Trimethoxyamphetamine; TMA; TMA-1; 3,4,5-TMA; α-Methylmescaline; alpha-Methylmescaline; AMM; Mescalamphetamine; 3,4,5-Trimethoxy-α-methylphenethylamine; EA‐1319; EA1319; 3C-Mescaline; 3C-M
- Routes of administration: Oral
- Drug class: Serotonergic psychedelic; Hallucinogen; Serotonin 5-HT_{2A} receptor agonist
- ATC code: None

Legal status
- Legal status: US: Schedule I

Pharmacokinetic data
- Duration of action: 6–8 hours

Identifiers
- IUPAC name: 1-(3,4,5-trimethoxyphenyl)propan-2-amine
- CAS Number: 1082-88-8
- PubChem CID: 31016
- DrugBank: DB01516
- ChemSpider: 28775
- UNII: P2K02L3YON
- KEGG: C22747
- ChEMBL: ChEMBL30336
- CompTox Dashboard (EPA): DTXSID00862529

Chemical and physical data
- Formula: C_{12}H_{19}NO_{3}
- Molar mass: 225.288 g·mol^{−1}
- 3D model (JSmol): Interactive image
- SMILES: CC(CC1=CC(=C(C(=C1)OC)OC)OC)N
- InChI: InChI=1S/C12H19NO3/c1-8(13)5-9-6-10(14-2)12(16-4)11(7-9)15-3/h6-8H,5,13H2,1-4H3; Key:WGTASENVNYJZBK-UHFFFAOYSA-N

3,4,5-Trimethoxyamphetamine (TMA, TMA-1, or 3,4,5-TMA), also known as α-methylmescaline (3C-mescaline or 3C-M) or mescalamphetamine, is a psychedelic drug of the phenethylamine and amphetamine families. It is one of the trimethoxyamphetamine (TMA) series of positional isomers. The drug is notable in being the amphetamine (α-methylated) analogue of mescaline (3,4,5-trimethoxyphenethylamine).

== Use and effects ==
In his book PiHKAL (Phenethylamines I Have Known and Loved), Alexander Shulgin lists TMA's dose as 100 to 250 mg orally and its duration as 6 to 8 hours. For comparison, mescaline is typically used at doses of 200 to 500 mg orally and is said to have a duration of 10 to 12 hours or longer. TMA's positional isomer 2,4,5-trimethoxyamphetamine (2,4,5-TMA or TMA-2) is much more potent than TMA, with a dose of 20 to 40 mg orally and a duration of 8 to 12 hours.

The effects of TMA have been reported to include closed-eye imagery, introspection, music enhancement, emotional volatility, annoyance and irritability, feeling violent, lightheadedness, giddiness, and nausea, among others. It is said to lack mescaline's color changes and to have a "thread of negativity" at higher doses and a possible "antisocial nature" that has limited interest in the drug.

== Pharmacology ==
=== Pharmacodynamics ===
TMA activities
Target	Affinity (K_{i}, nM)
5-HT_{1A}	1,678–>5,600
5-HT_{1B}	2,855
5-HT_{1D}	3,035
5-HT_{1E}	3,369
5-HT_{1F}	ND
5-HT_{2A}	>10,000 (K_{i}); 41.3–1,700 (EC_{50}); 40–96% (E_{max})
5-HT_{2B}	477 (K_{i}) >10,000 (EC_{50})
5-HT_{2C}	4,600–>10,000 (K_{i}); 47.4 (EC_{50}); 92% (E_{max})
5-HT_{3}	>10,000
5-HT_{4}	ND
5-HT_{5A}	>10,000
5-HT_{6}	>10,000
5-HT_{7}	749
α_{1A}, α_{1B}	>10,000
α_{1D}	ND
α_{2A}	2,071–4,030
α_{2B}	>10,000
α_{2C}	5,014
β_{1}, β_{2}	>10,000
D_{1}–D_{5}	>10,000
H_{1}–H_{4}	>10,000
M_{1}, M_{3}, M_{4}	ND
M_{2}, M_{5}	>10,000
nACh	260–>10,000
TAAR_{1}	1,800 (K_{i}) (mouse); 3,200 (K_{i}) (rat) >10,000 (EC_{50}) (human)
I_{1}	>10,000
σ_{1}	537
σ_{2}	537
SERT	>10,000 (K_{i}) >100,000 (IC_{50}); 16,000 (EC_{50}) (rat)
NET	>10,000 (K_{i}) >100,000 (IC_{50}) >100,000 (EC_{50}) (rat)
DAT	>10,000 (K_{i}) >100,000 (IC_{50}) >100,000 (EC_{50}) (rat)
MAO-A	>200,000 (IC_{50})
MAO-B	>200,000 (IC_{50})
Notes: The smaller the value, the more avidly the drug binds to the site. All proteins are human unless otherwise specified. Refs:

TMA is a low-potency serotonin 5-HT_{2A} receptor partial agonist, with an affinity (K_{i}) of >12,000 nM, an EC_{50} of 1,700 nM, and an E_{max} of 40%. Conversely, it was inactive at the serotonin 5-HT_{1A}, 5-HT_{2B} and 5-HT_{2C} receptors and at several other receptors, at least at the assessed concentrations (up to 10,000 nM). It showed affinity for the mouse and rat trace amine-associated receptor 1 (TAAR1) (K_{i} = 1,800 nM and 3,200 nM, respectively), whereas it was inactive at the human TAAR1 (EC_{50} > 10,000 nM).

TMA is also a very low-potency serotonin releasing agent (SRA), with an EC_{50} value of 16,000 nM. In contrast, it is inactive as a releasing agent and reuptake inhibitor of dopamine and norepinephrine (EC_{50} > 100,000 nM). Despite its apparent SRA activity in vitro, TMA did not increase brain serotonin or dopamine levels in rodents in vivo. TMA is similarly inactive as a monoamine oxidase inhibitor (MAOI), including of both monoamine oxidase A (MAO-A) and monoamine oxidase B (MAO-B) (IC_{50} > 200,000 nM).

The low potency of TMA as a serotonin 5-HT_{2A} receptor agonist is analogous to the case of mescaline, which is a well-known and widely used psychedelic but is likewise a very low-potency agonist of this receptor, showing an affinity (K_{i}) of 9,400 nM, an EC_{50} of 10,000 nM, and an E_{max} of 56% in the same study. For comparison, DOM has shown an affinity (K_{i}) of 88 nM and an EC_{50} of 4 to 24 nM.

== Chemistry ==
=== Synthesis ===
The chemical synthesis of TMA has been described.

=== Derivatives ===
A variety of derivatives of TMA, known as the 3C series, have been studied and described.

== History ==
TMA was first synthesized by Gordon Alles around 1937. He assessed it in both animal studies and self-experiments and documented its effects, but these were not reported until 1959. The drug was first described in the scientific literature in 1947 and its psychedelic effects were first described in 1955. TMA was studied at Edgewood Arsenal under the code name EA‐1319 in 1953 and 1954. The drug was further characterized by Alexander Shulgin and described in his 1991 book PiHKAL (Phenethylamines I Have Known and Loved).

== Society and culture ==
=== Legal status ===
==== Canada ====
TMA is a controlled substance in Canada.

==== United States ====
TMA is a Schedule I controlled substance in the United States.

== See also ==
- Substituted methoxyphenethylamine
- α-Ethylmescaline (3,4,5-trimethoxy-α-ethylphenethylamine)
- Methyl-TMA (N-methyl-TMA)
- 3,4-Dimethoxyamphetamine (3,4-DMA)
