= 2,5-Dimethoxy-4-fluoroamphetamine =

Chemical compound

DOF

Clinical data
- Other names: DOF; 2,5-Dimethoxy-4-fluoroamphetamine; 4-Fluoro-2,5-dimethoxyamphetamine
- Routes of administration: Oral
- Drug class: Serotonin receptor modulator; Serotonin 5-HT_{2A} receptor agonist; Stimulant; Possible psychedelic drug
- ATC code: None

Legal status
- Legal status: CA: Schedule I; UK: Class A

Identifiers
- IUPAC name: 1-(4-fluoro-2,5-dimethoxyphenyl)propan-2-amine
- CAS Number: 125903-69-7
- PubChem CID: 23844155
- ChemSpider: 23108678
- UNII: 93WSW5GYR6
- ChEMBL: ChEMBL267526
- CompTox Dashboard (EPA): DTXSID90635906

Chemical and physical data
- Formula: C_{11}H_{16}FNO_{2}
- Molar mass: 213.252 g·mol^{−1}
- 3D model (JSmol): Interactive image
- SMILES: CC(CC1=CC(=C(C=C1OC)F)OC)N
- InChI: InChI=1S/C11H16FNO2/c1-7(13)4-8-5-11(15-3)9(12)6-10(8)14-2/h5-7H,4,13H2,1-3H3; Key:NRANUECGGQVXOT-UHFFFAOYSA-N

2,5-Dimethoxy-4-fluoroamphetamine (DOF) is a serotonin receptor modulator and possible psychedelic drug of the phenethylamine, amphetamine, and DOx families. It is taken orally. The drug was encountered as a novel designer drug in Europe in 2015.

== Use and effects ==
In his books PiHKAL (Phenethylamines I Have Known and Loved) and The Shulgin Index, Volume One: Psychedelic Phenethylamines and Related Compounds, Alexander Shulgin states that the properties and effects of DOF in humans are unknown. Based on animal studies however, specifically drug discrimination tests, he estimates that it would be 4- to 6-fold less potent than DOI and DOB as a psychedelic drug in humans. In his book Phenethylamine: von der Struktur zur Funktion and other publications, Daniel Trachsel lists the dose of DOF as 10 mg or more orally. He states that DOF produces stimulating effects at a dose of 6 mg three times each spaced by 1 hour (18 mg total) orally based on initial anecdotal findings.

== Pharmacology ==
=== Pharmacodynamics ===
The receptor and transporter interactions of DOF have been characterized. As with other DOx drugs, it shows affinity for the serotonin 5-HT_{2} receptors and acts as a partial to full agonist of the serotonin 5-HT_{2A} and 5-HT_{2B} receptors. However, it shows much lower affinity for the serotonin 5-HT_{2} receptors than many other DOx drugs and a much lower degree of selectivity for the serotonin 5-HT_{2A} receptor over the serotonin 5-HT_{1A} receptor. On the other hand, the activational potencies of DOF at the serotonin 5-HT_{2A} and 5-HT_{2B} receptors were similar to those of DOB. The drug lacks significant affinity for the monoamine transporters (MATs), the human trace amine-associated receptor 1 (TAAR1), and various other receptors.

DOF substituted for DOM in rodent drug discrimination tests, albeit with 4- to 6-fold lower potency than other DOx drugs like DOI and DOB.

Daniel Trachsel further suspected that the molar refraction of the important 4-substituent in DOF and 2C-F may be too low to activate the serotonin 5-HT_{2A} receptor sufficiently to produce psychedelic effects. DOF more closely mimics the effects of the 4-unsubstituted 2,5-dimethoxyamphetamine than the effects of DOC, DOB, and DOI.

== Chemistry ==
=== Synthesis ===
The chemical synthesis of DOF has been described.

=== Analogues ===
Analogues of DOF include DOI, DOB, DOC, DOTFM, 2C-F, and 25F-NBOMe, among others.

== History ==
DOF was first described in the scientific literature by Richard Glennon and colleagues by 1982. Subsequently, its properties and effects in humans were described by Daniel Trachsel in 2012. The drug was encountered as a novel designer drug in Slovenia in 2015.

== Society and culture ==
=== Legal status ===
==== Canada ====
DOF is a controlled substance in Canada under phenethylamine blanket-ban language.

==== United States ====
DOF is not an explicitly controlled substance in the United States. However, it could be considered a Schedule I controlled substance as an analogue of DOM and DOB under the Federal Analogue Act in this country.

== See also ==
- DOx (psychedelics)
