= DOTFM-NDEPA =

Clinical data
- Other names: NDEPA-DOTFM; "Compound ko1"
- Drug class: Possible serotonin 5-HT_{2A} receptor modulator
- ATC code: None

Identifiers
- CAS Number: 260810-29-5

Chemical and physical data
- Formula: C_{19}H_{29}F_{3}N_{2}O_{3}
- Molar mass: 390.447 g·mol^{−1}
- 3D model (JSmol): Interactive image
- SMILES: C(F)(F)(F)C1C=C(C(=CC=1OC)CC(C)N(CCC(=O)N(CC)CC)[H])OC
- InChI: InChI=1S/C19H29F3N2O3/c1-6-24(7-2)18(25)8-9-23-13(3)10-14-11-17(27-5)15(19(20,21)22)12-16(14)26-4/h11-13,23H,6-10H2,1-5H3; Key:XQPSNZUNPOQENQ-UHFFFAOYSA-N

DOTFM-NDEPA is a chemical compound of the phenethylamine, DOx, and NDEPA families. It is the N-(N,N-diethylpropylamide) (NDEPA) derivative of the psychedelic drug DOTFM. The drug can also be thought of as a derivative of DOTFM with an LSD-like N,N-diethylamide moiety. A quantitative structure–activity relationship (QSAR) predicted that DOTFM-NDEPA would bind with high affinity to the serotonin 5-HT_{2A} receptor. Its predicted affinity (K_{i}) was 22 nM. DOTFM-NDEPA was first described in the scientific literature by 1999.

== See also ==
- Substituted methoxyphenethylamine
- Partial lysergamide
- DOB-NDEPA
- DOI-NDEPA
- 25D-NM-NDEAOP
- N-DEAOP-NMPEA
- DEMPDHPCA-2C-D
