= MALM (drug) =

Clinical data
- Other names: 4-Allyloxy-2,5-dimethoxyamphetamine; 2,5-Dimethoxy-4-allyloxyamphetamine
- Drug class: Serotonin 5-HT_{2} receptor agonist
- ATC code: None

Identifiers
- IUPAC name: 1-{2,5-dimethoxy-4-[(prop-2-en-1-yl)oxy]phenyl}propan-2-amine

Chemical and physical data
- Formula: C_{14}H_{21}NO_{3}
- Molar mass: 251.326 g·mol^{−1}
- 3D model (JSmol): Interactive image
- SMILES: C=CCOc1cc(OC)c(cc1OC)CC(N)C
- InChI: InChI=1S/C14H21NO3/c1-5-6-18-14-9-12(16-3)11(7-10(2)15)8-13(14)17-4/h5,8-10H,1,6-7,15H2,2-4H3; Key:VBAQDLWNBQBWPR-UHFFFAOYSA-N

MALM, also known as 4-allyloxy-2,5-dimethoxyamphetamine, is a serotonin receptor modulator of the phenethylamine, amphetamine, and DOx families. It is a derivative of the DOx psychedelics TMA-2 and MEM in which the 4-position substituent has been extended. The drug is also the α-methyl or amphetamine analogue of 2C-O-16.

== Use and effects ==
The properties and effects of MALM in humans do not appear to be known.

== Pharmacology ==
=== Pharmacodynamics ===
MALM acts as a potent agonist of the serotonin 5-HT_{2} receptors. Its affinities (K_{i}) were 150 nM for the serotonin 5-HT_{2A} receptor and 900 nM for the serotonin 5-HT_{2C} receptor, whereas its activational potencies (EC_{50} (E_{max})) were 2.9 nM (89%) at the serotonin 5-HT_{2A} receptor and 9.5 nM (101%) at the serotonin 5-HT_{2B} receptor. Besides the serotonin 5-HT_{2} receptors, the drug showed little to no activity at various other assessed targets, such as the monoamine transporters. It does not appear to have been tested for psychedelic-like activity in animals.

== History ==
MALM was first described in the scientific literature by Daniel Trachsel in 2013. Subsequently, it was characterized in more detail by a group including Trachsel and Matthias Liechti in 2019. The compound's name is said to derive from its benzene ring substituents, "methoxy allyloxy methoxy".

== Society and culture ==
=== Legal status ===
==== Canada ====
MALM is a controlled substance in Canada under phenethylamine blanket-ban language.

== See also ==
- DOx (psychedelics)
- MEM § Derivatives
- Allylescaline
- 3C-AL
