= MIPM =

Clinical data
- Other names: 4-Isopropoxy-2,5-dimethoxyamphetamine; 2,5-Dimethoxy-4-isopropoxyamphetamine
- Routes of administration: Unknown
- Drug class: Serotonin 5-HT_{2} receptor agonist
- ATC code: None

Pharmacokinetic data
- Duration of action: Unknown

Identifiers
- IUPAC name: 1-(2,5-dimethoxy-4-propan-2-yloxyphenyl)propan-2-amine
- PubChem CID: 44719610
- ChemSpider: 23553121

Chemical and physical data
- Formula: C_{14}H_{23}NO_{3}
- Molar mass: 253.342 g·mol^{−1}
- 3D model (JSmol): Interactive image
- SMILES: CC(C)OC1=C(C=C(C(=C1)OC)CC(C)N)OC
- InChI: InChI=1S/C14H23NO3/c1-9(2)18-14-8-12(16-4)11(6-10(3)15)7-13(14)17-5/h7-10H,6,15H2,1-5H3; Key:UEUXKMHRZTVVCQ-UHFFFAOYSA-N

MIPM, also known as 4-isopropoxy-2,5-dimethoxyamphetamine, is a serotonin receptor modulator and possible psychedelic drug of the phenethylamine, amphetamine, and DOx families. It is a derivative of the DOx psychedelics TMA-2 and MEM in which the 4-position substituent has been extended. The drug is also the α-methyl or amphetamine analogue of 2C-O-4.

== Use and effects ==
The properties and effects of MIPM in humans do not appear to be known.

== Pharmacology ==
=== Pharmacodynamics ===
MIPM acts as a low-potency agonist of the serotonin 5-HT_{2} receptors. Its affinities (K_{i}) were 4,400 nM for the serotonin 5-HT_{2A} receptor and 9,030 nM for the serotonin 5-HT_{2C} receptor, whereas its activational potencies (EC_{50} (E_{max})) were 990 nM (47%) at the serotonin 5-HT_{2A} receptor and 180 nM (20%) at the serotonin 5-HT_{2B} receptor. Besides the serotonin 5-HT_{2} receptors, the drug showed little to no activity at various other assessed targets, such as the monoamine transporters. It does not appear to have been tested for psychedelic-like activity in animals.

== Chemistry ==
=== Synthesis ===
The chemical synthesis of MIPM has been described.

=== Analogues ===
Analogues of MIPM include TMA-2, MEM, and MPM, among others.

== History ==
MIPM was first described in the literature by Alexander Shulgin in his book PiHKAL (Phenethylamines I Have Known and Loved). He synthesized the compound, but discouraged by the reduced activity of MPM compared to TMA-2 and MEM, did not test it in humans. Subsequently, MIPM was characterized in more detail by a group including Daniel Trachsel and Matthias Liechti in 2019. The compound's name is said to derive from its benzene ring substituents, "methoxy isopropoxy methoxy".

== Society and culture ==
=== Legal status ===
==== Canada ====
MIPM is a controlled substance in Canada under phenethylamine blanket-ban language.

== See also ==
- DOx (psychedelics)
- MEM § Derivatives
- Isoproscaline
- 2C-T-4
