= DOx =

Class of chemical compounds

2,5-Dimethoxyamphetamine (2,5-DMA), the base chemical structure of the DOx family.

4-Substituted-2,5-dimethoxyamphetamines (DOx) is a chemical class of substituted amphetamine derivatives featuring methoxy groups at the 2- and 5- positions of the phenyl ring, and a substituent such as alkyl or halogen at the 4- position of the phenyl ring. They are 4-substituted derivatives of 2,5-dimethoxyamphetamine (2,5-DMA, DOH) and are structurally related to the naturally occurring phenethylamine psychedelic mescaline.

The most well-known DOx drugs are DOM, DOI, DOB, DOET, and DOC. DOI is widely used in scientific research. DOM has been used as a recreational drug, while DOET was an experimental pharmaceutical drug.

Most compounds of this class are potent and long-lasting psychedelic drugs, and act as selective 5-HT_{2A}, 5-HT_{2B}, and 5-HT_{2C} receptor agonists. A few bulkier derivatives such as DOAM have similarly high affinity for 5-HT_{2} receptors but have reduced efficacy and potency as psychedelics.

DOI has been found to have extraordinarily potent anti-inflammatory effects. These properties are not shared by all other related drugs and appear to be mediated by functionally selective serotonin 5-HT_{2A} receptor activation. The anti-inflammatory effects of DOI and related drugs may have medical applications.

== Use and effects ==
Oral doses and durations of DOx drugs
| Compound | Chemical name | Dose | Duration |
|---|---|---|---|
| DOAM | 4-Amyl-2,5-dimethoxyamphetamine | ≥5–40 mg | Unknown |
| DOB | 4-Bromo-2,5-dimethoxyamphetamine | 1–3 mg | 18–30 hours |
| DOBU | 4-Butyl-2,5-dimethoxyamphetamine | ≥1–10 mg | Very long |
| DOBz (DOBN) | 4-Benzyl-2,5-dimethoxyamphetamine | Unknown | Unknown |
| DOC | 4-Chloro-2,5-dimethoxyamphetamine | 1.5–5 mg | 12–24 hours |
| DOEF | 4-(2-Fluoroethyl)-2,5-dimethoxyamphetamine | 2–3.5 mg | 12–16 hours |
| DOET | 4-Ethyl-2,5-dimethoxyamphetamine | 2–6 mg | 5–20 hours |
| DOF | 4-Fluoro-2,5-dimethoxyamphetamine | >18 mg | Unknown |
| DOH (2,5-DMA) | 2,5-Dimethoxyamphetamine | 80–160 mg | 6–8 hours |
| DOHx | 4-Hexyl-2,5-dimethoxyamphetamine | Unknown | Unknown |
| DOI | 4-Iodo-2,5-dimethoxyamphetamine | 1.5–3 mg | 16–30 hours |
| DOIB | 4-Isobutyl-2,5-dimethoxyamphetamine | 10–15 mg | Unknown |
| DOIP | 4-Isopropyl-2,5-dimethoxyamphetamine | 20–30 mg | Unknown |
| DOM | 4-Methyl-2,5-dimethoxyamphetamine | 3–10 mg | 14–20 hours |
| DON | 4-Nitro-2,5-dimethoxyamphetamine | 3–4.5 mg | 8–15 hours |
| DOPP | 4-(3-Phenylpropyl)-2,5-dimethoxyamphetamine | Unknown | Unknown |
| DOPR | 4-Propyl-2,5-dimethoxyamphetamine | 2.5–5 mg | 20–30 hours |
| DOSB | 4-sec-Butyl-2,5-dimethoxyamphetamine | 25–30 mg | Very long |
| DOTB | 4-tert-Butyl-2,5-dimethoxyamphetamine | >25 mg | Unknown |
| DOTFE | 4-(2,2,2-Trifluoroethyl)-2,5-dimethoxyamphetamine | >3 mg | Unknown |
| DOTFM | 4-(Trifluoromethyl)-2,5-dimethoxyamphetamine | 0.3–1 mg | Unknown |
| DOYN | 4-Ethynyl-2,5-dimethoxyamphetamine | 2–6 mg | 10–15 hours |
| TMA-2 (2,4,5-TMA) | 4-Methoxy-2,5-dimethoxyamphetamine | 20–40 mg | 8–12 hours |
| MEM | | 20–50 mg | 10–14 hours |
| MPM | 4-Propoxy-2,5-dimethoxyamphetamine | ≥30 mg | "Probably short" |
| MIPM | 4-Isopropoxy-2,5-dimethoxyamphetamine | Unknown | Unknown |
| MBM | 4-Butoxy-2,5-dimethoxyamphetamine | >12 mg | Unknown |
| MALM | 4-Allyloxy-2,5-dimethoxyamphetamine | Unknown | Unknown |
| MMALM | 4-Methallyloxy-2,5-dimethoxyamphetamine | Unknown | Unknown |
| MAM | 4-Amyloxy-2,5-dimethoxyamphetamine | >16 mg | Unknown |
| MFEM | 4-(2-Fluoroethoxy)-2,5-dimethoxyamphetamine | Unknown | Unknown |
| MDFEM | 4-(2,2-Difluoroethoxy)-2,5-dimethoxyamphetamine | Unknown | Unknown |
| MTFEM | 4-(2,2,2-Trifluoroethoxy)-2,5-dimethoxyamphetamine | ≥10 mg | ~12 hours |
| Aleph (DOT) | 4-Methylthio-2,5-dimethoxyamphetamine | 5–10 mg | 6–8 hours |
| Aleph-2 (DOT-2) | 4-Ethylthio-2,5-dimethoxyamphetamine | 4–8 mg | 8–16 hours |
| Aleph-4 (DOT-4) | 4-Isopropylthio-2,5-dimethoxyamphetamine | 7–12 mg | 12–20 hours |
| Aleph-6 (DOT-6) | 4-Phenylthio-2,5-dimethoxyamphetamine | ≥40 mg | Very long |
| Aleph-7 (DOT-7) | 4-Propylthio-2,5-dimethoxyamphetamine | 4–7 mg | 15–30 hours |
| Ganesha (G; G-0) | 3,4-Dimethyl-2,5-dimethoxyamphetamine | 20–32 mg | 18–24 hours |
| G-3 | 3,4-Trimethylene-2,5-dimethoxyamphetamine | 12–18 mg | 8–12 hours |
| G-4 | 3,4-Tetramethylene-2,5-dimethoxyamphetamine | Unknown | Unknown |
| G-5 | 3,4-Norbornyl-2,5-dimethoxyamphetamine | 14–20 mg | 16–30 hours |
| G-N | 1,4-Dimethoxynaphthyl-2-isopropylamine | >2 mg | Unknown |
Refs:

== Side effects ==
DOx drugs like DOM have been associated with certain side effects that have not occurred to the same extent with other psychedelics like LSD. Examples of such side effects include physical symptoms like sweating, tremors, and large increases in heart rate.

== Pharmacology ==
=== Pharmacodynamics ===
==== Actions ====
DOx drugs at the human 5-HT_{2} receptors
| Compound | Affinity (K_{i}, nM) | | |
| Compound | 5-HT_{2A} | 5-HT_{2B} | 5-HT_{2C} |
|---|---|---|---|
| 2,5-DMA | 211–2,502 | 1,039 | 104–>5,070 |
| DOM | 88–507.4 | 11.7 | 404–3,980 |
| DOET | 12–100 | 28.8 | 107.2–108 |
| DOPR | 0.9 | 54.4 | 1.1 |
| DOBU | 5.4 | ND | 60 |
| DOTB | 3.7 | 24.6 | 2.2 |
| DOAM | 3.5 | ND | 75 |
| DOHx | 0.1 | 30.3 | 0.7 |
| DOF | 41.7–378 | 227 | 28.7–792 |
| DOC | 1.4–12 | 31.8 | 2.0–143 |
| DOB | 0.6–41 | 26.9 | 1.3–78 |
| DOI | 0.7–165.4 | 20.0–335.9 | 2.4–48 |
| TMA-2 | 57.9–584.2 | 154.4–307 | 87.7–4,062 |
| MEM | 73.0–3,948 | 64.5–763 | 124–>10,000 |
| Aleph-2 | 60.4 | 1.6 | 50.3 |
| DOAc | 80.5 | 313 | 91.3 |
| DON | 5.5 | 166 | 22.4 |
| DOCN | 45.7 | 774 | 1,011 |
| DOBZ | 0.4 | 35.0 | 1.0 |
| M-154 | 94.2 | 341 | 68.1 |
| D-367 | 88.5 | 521 | 514 |
| QDOB | 2,155 | >10,000 | 6,298 |
Notes: The smaller the value, the more avidly the drug binds to the site. Refs:

The DOx drugs act as agonists of the serotonin 5-HT_{2} receptors, including of the serotonin 5-HT_{2A}, 5-HT_{2B}, and 5-HT_{2C} receptors. Their psychedelic effects are thought to be mediated specifically by activation of the serotonin 5-HT_{2A} receptor.

In contrast to other amphetamines, DOx drugs like DOC, DOET, and DOM are inactive as monoamine releasing agents and reuptake inhibitors. Some of the DOx drugs, including DOB, DOET, DOI, and DOM, are agonists of the rat, rhesus monkey, and/or human trace amine-associated receptor 1 (TAAR1) with varying potencies.

==== Effects ====
In contrast to amphetamines like (–)-cathinone, but similarly to mescaline, DOM has shown no stimulant-like or reinforcing effects in rhesus monkeys. Conversely however, DOC has shown reinforcing effects, including conditioned place preference (CPP) and self-administration, in rodents similarly to methamphetamine. This is analogous to other findings in which various 2C and NBOMe drugs have been found to produce brain dopaminergic elevations and reinforcing effects in rodents.

=== Pharmacokinetics ===
The DOx drugs are orally active and many have doses in the range of 1 to 10 mg and durations in the range of 8 to 30 hours. Some DOx drugs, such as DOM and DOB, appear to have durations that increase non-linearly with dose, for instance 8 hours at lower doses and as long as 30 hours or even up to 3 or 4 days at higher doses. This suggests that the pathways mediating the metabolism of these drugs can saturate. The DOx drugs are metabolized primarily by O-demethylation. However, DOM is primarily metabolized by hydroxylation at its methyl group.

== History ==
DOM was the first psychedelic of the DOx series to be discovered. It was first synthesized by Alexander Shulgin at Dow Chemical Company in 1963, who had had his first psychedelic experience, with mescaline (3,4,5-trimethoxyphenethylamine), in 1960. Shulgin personally tried DOM on January 4, 1964 and discovered its psychedelic effects. 2,4,5-Trimethoxyamphetamine (TMA-2; "DOMeO") had been synthesized by Bruckner in 1933, but its psychedelic effects were not described until Shulgin tried the compound and reported its effects in the scientific literature in 1964. Prior to this, 3,4,5-trimethoxyamphetamine (TMA; α-methylmescaline) had been synthesized by Hey in 1947, being found by him to produce euphoria, and was described by Peretz and colleagues in 1955 as clearly producing psychedelic effects.

Following his discovery of DOM, Shulgin developed DOET and found that at low doses it was a remarkable "psychic energizer" without producing psychedelic effects at these doses. Dow Chemical Company decided to move forward with clinical trials of DOET as a potential pharmaceutical drug for such purposes. Shulgin and Dow Chemical Company filed a patent for DOET in 1966, although it was not published until 1970. Dow Chemical Company tasked Solomon H. Snyder at Johns Hopkins University with clinically studying DOET.

In April 1967, following the banning of LSD in California in 1966, DOM emerged as a street drug and legal LSD alternative with the name "STP" (allegedly short for "Serenity, Tranquility, and Peace") in the Haight-Ashbury district in San Francisco. This occurred due to DOM being publicly distributed for free in the form of high-dose tablets by LSD distributor Owsley Stanley, who had personally learned of DOM from Shulgin. It is unclear why Shulgin provided information about DOM to Stanley, since doing so had the potential to risk Shulgin's professional career and the DOET clinical studies. One possibility is that Dow Chemical Company was not further looking into DOM and Shulgin thought that it was a promising drug that would otherwise be forgotten. In any case, street use of DOM was short-lived because the tablets caused a public health crisis due to them often producing very long durations (up to 3–4 days), intense experiences, worrying physical side effects, and hospitalizations. DOM was first reported on in the media and scientific literature in 1967 as a result of the crisis. DOM became illegal in the United States in 1968.

Dow Chemical Company terminated its clinical research program on DOET due to the DOM public health crisis. DOET was subsequently first described in the literature by Snyder and colleagues in 1968. Snyder continued to be interested in DOET as a potential medicine, but it was never further developed. Snyder also described 2,5-dimethoxyamphetamine (2,5-DMA), which had been synthesized and tested by Shulgin, in the literature in 1968. DOM and DOET were further described in the scientific literature by Shulgin in 1969. In addition, Shulgin discussed DOM, DOET, TMA-2, and 2,5-DMA in a book chapter on hallucinogens published in 1970.

The earlier DOx drugs like DOM and DOET were subsequently followed by DOB, which was developed by Shulgin and colleagues like Claudio Naranjo, in 1971, and by DOI, DOC, and a few other analogues, which were developed by another research group, in 1973. After this, numerous other DOx drugs were synthesized and characterized, both by Shulgin and other scientists.

Following its discovery, DOI has become widely used in scientific research in the study of the serotonin 5-HT_{2} receptors.

== Society and culture ==
=== Legal status ===
==== Canada ====
The DOx drugs are controlled substances as amphetamines in Canada.

== List of DOx drugs ==
The DOx family includes the following members:

| Structure | Name | Abbreviation | CAS # | Ref |
|---|---|---|---|---|
| | 2,5-Dimethoxyamphetamine | 2,5-DMA | 2801-68-5 | |
| | 2,5-Dimethoxy-4-methylamphetamine | DOM | 15588-95-1 | |
| | 2,5-Dimethoxy-4-ethylamphetamine | DOET | 22004-32-6 | |
| | 2,5-Dimethoxy-4-propylamphetamine | DOPR | 63779-88-4 | |
| | 2,5-Dimethoxy-4-isopropylamphetamine | DOiP | 42306-96-7 | |
| | 2,5-Dimethoxy-4-butylamphetamine | DOBU | 63779-89-5 | |
| | 2,5-Dimethoxy-4-isobutylamphetamine | DOiB | 89556-64-9 | |
| | 2,5-Dimethoxy-4-sec-butylamphetamine | DOsB | 89556-71-8 | |
| | 2,5-Dimethoxy-4-tert-butylamphetamine | DOtB | 41538-42-5 | |
| | 2,5-Dimethoxy-4-amylamphetamine | DOAM | 63779-90-8 | |
| | 2,5-Dimethoxy-4-hexylamphetamine | DOHx | 125903-45-9 | |
| | 2,5-Dimethoxy-4-octylamphetamine | DOCT (DOOC) | 125903-46-0 | |
| | 2,5-Dimethoxy-4-ethenylamphetamine | DOV (DOVI) | ? | |
| | 2,5-Dimethoxy-4-ethynylamphetamine | DOYN | 633290-70-7 | |
| | 2,5-Dimethoxy-4-benzylamphetamine | DOBz | 125903-73-3 | |
| | 2,5-Dimethoxy-4-(3-methoxybenzyl)amphetamine | DO3MeOBZ | 930836-90-1 | |
| | 4-(3-Phenylpropyl)-2,5-dimethoxyamphetamine | DOPP | ? | |
| | 2,5-Dimethoxy-4-[(tetrahydrofuran-2-yl)methyl]amphetamine | DOTHFM | 930776-12-8 | |
| | 2,5-Dimethoxy-4-bromoamphetamine | DOB | 64638-07-9 | |
| | 2,5-Dimethoxy-4-iodoamphetamine | DOI | 64584-34-5 | |
| | 2,5-Dimethoxy-4-chloroamphetamine | DOC | 123431-31-2 | |
| | 2,5-Dimethoxy-4-fluoroamphetamine | DOF | 125903-69-7 | |
| | 2,5-Dimethoxy-4-(fluoromethyl)amphetamine | DOFM | ? | |
| | 2,5-Dimethoxy-4-(difluoromethyl)amphetamine | DODFM | ? | |
| | 2,5-Dimethoxy-4-trifluoromethylamphetamine | DOTFM | 159277-07-3 | |
| | 2,5-Dimethoxy-4-(2-fluoroethyl)amphetamine | DOEF | 121649-01-2 | |
| | 2,5-Dimethoxy-4-(2,2,2-trifluoroethyl)amphetamine | DOTFE | ? | |
| | 2,5-Dimethoxy-4-(3-fluoropropyl)amphetamine | DOPF | ? | |
| | 4-Chloromethyl-2,5-dimethoxyamphetamine | DOMCl | ? | |
| | 2,5-Dimethoxy-4-methylthioamphetamine | Aleph-1 (DOT) | 61638-07-1 | |
| | 2,5-Dimethoxy-4-ethylthioamphetamine | Aleph-2 | 185562-00-9 | |
| | 2,5-Dimethoxy-4-isopropylthioamphetamine | Aleph-4 | 123643-26-5 | |
| | 2,5-Dimethoxy-4-phenylthioamphetamine | Aleph-6 | 952006-44-9 | |
| | 2,5-Dimethoxy-4-propylthioamphetamine | Aleph-7 | 207740-16-7 | |
| | 2,4,5-Trimethoxyamphetamine | TMA-2 (DOMeO) | 1083-09-6 | |
| | 2,5-Dimethoxy-4-ethoxyamphetamine | MEM | 16128-88-4 | |
| | 2,5-Dimethoxy-4-propoxyamphetamine | MPM | 123643-24-3 | |
| | 4-Isopropoxy-2,5-dimethoxyamphetamine | MIPM | ? | |
| | 4-Allyloxy-2,5-dimethoxyamphetamine | MALM | ? | |
| | 4-Methallyloxy-2,5-dimethoxyamphetamine | MMALM | ? | |
| | 4-Fluoromethoxy-2,5-dimethoxyamphetamine | DOFMO | ? | |
| | 4-Difluoromethoxy-2,5-dimethoxyamphetamine | DODFMO | ? | |
| | 4-Trifluoromethoxy-2,5-dimethoxyamphetamine | DOTFMO | ? | |
| | 4-(2-Fluoroethoxy)-2,5-dimethoxyamphetamine | MFEM | ? | |
| | 4-(2,2-Difluoroethoxy)-2,5-dimethoxyamphetamine | MDFEM | ? | |
| | 4-(2,2,2-Trifluoroethoxy)-2,5-dimethoxyamphetamine | MTFEM | ? | |
| | 2,5-Dimethoxy-4-(methoxymethyl)amphetamine | DOMOM | 260810-10-4 | |
| | 2,5-Dimethoxy-4-(ethoxymethyl)amphetamine | DOMOE | 930836-81-0 | |
| | 2,5-Dimethoxy-4-acetylamphetamine | DOAc | 222022-54-0 | |
| | 4-Carboxy-2,5-dimethoxyamphetamine | DOCA | 29907-75-3 | |
| | 4-Amino-2,5-dimethoxyamphetamine | DOA (DONH) | 42203-80-5 | |
| | 4-Dimethylamino-2,5-dimethoxyamphetamine | DODMeA (DONMM; FLA-527) | 88753-12-2 | |
| | 2,5-Dimethoxy-4-nitroamphetamine | DON | 67460-68-8 | |
| | 2,5-Dimethoxy-4-cyanoamphetamine | DOCN | 125903-74-4 | |

== Related compounds ==
A number of additional compounds are known with alternative substitutions:

| Structure | Name | Abbreviation | CAS # |
|---|---|---|---|
| | 2,5-Dimethoxy-N-methylamphetamine | Methyl-DMA (N-methyl-DMA) | 54687-43-3 |
| | 2,5-Dimethoxy-4-methyl-N-methylamphetamine | N-Methyl-DOM (Beatrice) | 92206-37-6 |
| | 2,5-dimethoxy-4-methyl-N-hydroxyamphetamine | N-Hydroxy-DOM | 43022-01-1 |
| | 2,5-Dimethoxy-4-ethyl-N-methylamphetamine | N-Methyl-DOET | ? |
| | 2,4,5-Trimethoxy-N-methylamphetamine | N-Methyl-TMA-2 | 93675-32-2 |
| | 2,5-Dimethoxy-4-bromo-N-methylamphetamine | N-Methyl-DOB | 155638-80-5 |
| | 2,5-Dimethoxy-4-iodo-N-methylamphetamine | N-Methyl-DOI (2,5-IDNA) | 844888-63-7 |
| | 2,5-Dimethoxy-4-iodo-N,N-dimethylamphetamine | IDNNA (N,N-dimethyl-DOI) | 67707-78-2 |
| | 2,5-Dimethoxy-3,4-methylenedioxyamphetamine | DMMDA | 15183-13-8 |
| | 2,5-Dimethoxy-3,4-dimethylamphetamine (Ganesha) | 3-Methyl-DOM | 207740-37-2 |
| | 2,5-Dimethoxy-3,4-trimethylenylamphetamine | G-3 | 207740-36-1 |
| | 2,5-Dimethoxy-3,4-tetramethylenylamphetamine | G-4 | ? |
| | 2,5-Dimethoxy-3,4-norbornylamphetamine | G-5 | 133787-68-5 |
| | 1,4-Dimethoxynaphthyl-2-isopropylamine | G-N | 477904-62-4 |
| | 1-(5,8-Dimethoxy-3,4-dihydro-1H-isochromen-7-yl)propan-2-amine | G-O | 774538-38-4 |
| | 4,6-Dimethyl-2,5-dimethoxyamphetamine | Juno (6-methyl-DOM) | ? |
| | 2,5-Dimethoxy-3,4,6-trimethylamphetamine | DOTMA (Julia; 3,6-dimethyl-DOM) | ? |
| | 2,5-Dimethoxy-3,4-dichloroamphetamine | DODC | 1373918-65-0 |
| | 2,5-Dimethoxy-4,6-dibromoamphetamine | DODB | ? |
| | 2,5-Dimethoxy-β-hydroxyamphetamine | Methoxamine | 390-28-3 |
| | 2,5-Dimethoxy-β-ketocathinone | βk-DOB | ? |
| | 2,6-Dimethoxy-4-methylamphetamine | ψ-DOM (psi-DOM) | 80888-36-4 |
| | 2,3,4,5-Tetramethoxyamphetamine | TeMA | 23693-26-7 |
| | 1-(4-Bromo-2,3,6,7-tetrahydrofuro[2,3-f][1]benzofuran-8-yl)propan-2-amine | DOB-FLY | 219986-75-1 |
| | Bromo-DragonFLY | DOB-DFLY | 502759-67-3 |
| | 2,5-Dimethoxy-4-methylphenylcyclopropylamine | DMCPA | 15183-13-8 |
| | 3-(4-Bromo-2,5-dimethoxyphenyl)azetidine | ZC-B | 2641630-65-9 |
| | 5,8-Dimethoxy-7-methyl-1,2,3,4-tetrahydroisoquinoline | DOM-CR (DOM-THIQ) | ? |
| | 5,8-Dimethoxy-7-bromo-1,2,3,4-tetrahydroisoquinoline | DOB-CR (DOB-THIQ) | 183429-24-5 |
| | 2,7-Dimethyl-5,8-dimethoxy-1,2,3,4-tetrahydroisoquinoline | N-Methyl-DOM-CR (Beatrice-CR) | 228997-46-4 |
| | 4,7-Dimethoxy-5-methyl-2-aminoindane | DOM-AI | 52904-71-9 |
| | 5,8-Dimethoxy-6-methyl-2-aminotetralin | DOM-AT | 53609-01-1 |
| | 6,8-Dichloro-5-methoxy-3,4-dihydro-2H-1-benzopyran-3-amine | CT-5126 | ? |
| | 7-Methoxy-8-(trifluoromethyl)-2,3,4,5-tetrahydro-1-benzoxepin-4-amine | TFMBOX | 774160-02-0 |
| | 8-Bromo-6-methoxy-2a,3,4,5-tetrahydro-2H-naphtho[1,8-bc]furan-4-amine | 2C-B-5-hemiFLY-α6 | ? |
| | 1-(3-bromo-5-methoxy-1,6,7,8,9,9a-hexahydro-2-oxabenzo[cd]azulen-6-yl)methanamine | 2CB7 | ? |
| | N-(2-Methoxybenzyl)-2,5-dimethoxy-4-methylamphetamine | DOM-NBOMe | 2836395-73-2 |
| | N-(2-Methoxybenzyl)-2,5-dimethoxy-4-bromoamphetamine | DOB-NBOMe | ? |
| | N-(2-Methoxybenzyl)-2,5-dimethoxy-4-iodoamphetamine | DOI-NBOMe | ? |
| | 2-(2,5-Dimethoxy-4-bromobenzyl)-6-(2-methoxyphenyl)piperidine | DMBMPP (juncosamine) | 1391499-52-7 |
| | N-Diethylaminocarbonylethyl-2,5-dimethoxy-4-methylamphetamine | DOM-NDEPA | ? |
| | N-Diethylaminocarbonylethyl-2,5-dimethoxy-4-bromoamphetamine | DOB-NDEPA | 260810-30-8 |
| | N-Diethylaminocarbonylethyl-2,5-dimethoxy-4-iodoamphetamine | DOI-NDEPA | 260810-31-9 |
| | N-Diethylaminocarbonylethyl-2,5-dimethoxy-4-(trifluoromethyl)amphetamine | DOTFM-NDEPA | 260810-29-5 |
| | N-Diethylaminocarbonylethyl-2,4,5-trimethoxyamphetamine | TMA-2-NDEPA | ? |
| | 1,3-Dimethyl-7-{2-[1-(2,5-dimethoxy-4-chlorophenyl)propan-2-ylamino]ethyl}purine-2,6-dione | ZDCM-04 (DOC-fenethylline) | ? |
| | 2-Hydroxy-5-methoxy-4-methylamphetamine | 2-DM-DOM (2-OH-DOM) | 52336-49-9 |
| | 5-Hydroxy-2-methoxy-4-methylamphetamine | 5-DM-DOM (5-OH-DOM) | 60113-84-0 |
| | 2,5-Dihydroxy-4-methylamphetamine | 2,5-DDM-DOM | 52336-50-2 |
| | 2,4,5-Trihydroxyamphetamine | THA (THA-2) | 136706-33-7 |
| | 2-Methylthio-4-methyl-5-methoxyamphetamine | 2-TOM (2-thio-DOM) | 207740-44-1 |
| | 2-Methoxy-4-methyl-5-methylthioamphetamine | 5-TOM (5-thio-DOM) | 207740-45-2 |
| | 2-Methoxy-4-methyl-5-methylsulfinylamphetamine | TOMSO (5-TOM-sulfoxide) | 757142-16-8 |
| | 2-Methylthio-4-ethyl-5-methoxyamphetamine | 2-TOET (2-thio-DOET) | 779279-63-9 |
| | 2-Methoxy-4-ethyl-5-methylthioamphetamine | 5-TOET (5-thio-DOET) | 207740-43-0 |
| | 2,5-Dimethylthio-4-methylamphetamine | Bis-TOM (2,5-dithio-TOM) | 765225-27-2 |
| | 2-Methylthio-4,5-dimethoxyamphetamine | Ortho-DOT (2-thio-TMA-2) | 79440-51-0 |
| | 2,4-Dimethoxy-5-methylthioamphetamine | Meta-DOT (5-thio-TMA-2) | 79440-52-1 |

== See also ==
- 2,5-Dimethoxyamphetamine
- 2C, 3C, 4C, scaline, Ψ-PEA, 25-NB, FLY
- Substituted amphetamines
- Substituted benzofurans
- Substituted cathinones
- Substituted methoxyphenethylamine
- Substituted methylenedioxyphenethylamines
- Substituted phenethylamines
- Substituted tryptamines
- PiHKAL
- The Shulgin Index
