= 25B-NAcPip =

Clinical data
- Other names: N-(Piperidin-1-ylcarbonylmethyl)-4-bromo-2,5-dimethoxyphenethylamine
- ATC code: None

Legal status
- Legal status: In general Unscheduled

Identifiers
- IUPAC name: 2-{[2-(4-bromo-2,5-dimethoxyphenyl)ethyl]amino}-1-(piperidin-1-yl)ethan-1-one
- CAS Number: 2857834-62-7
- PubChem CID: 169777235

Chemical and physical data
- Formula: C_{17}H_{25}BrN_{2}O_{3}
- Molar mass: 385.302 g·mol^{−1}
- 3D model (JSmol): Interactive image
- SMILES: COc1cc(Br)c(cc1CCNCC(=O)N1CCCCC1)OC
- InChI: InChI=1S/C17H25BrN2O3/c1-22-15-11-14(18)16(23-2)10-13(15)6-7-19-12-17(21)20-8-4-3-5-9-20/h10-11,19H,3-9,12H2,1-2H3; Key:NPHDUYTXALMKMJ-UHFFFAOYSA-N

25B-NAcPip is a chemical compound related to the 25-NB family of psychedelic drugs. It has been described in patents published by psychedelic pharmaceutical companies like Betterlife Pharma and Mindstate Design Labs. Uniquely among 25-NB compounds, 25B-NAcPip is similar to simplified/partial lysergamides and has elements of the chemical structure of LSD and related psychedelic lysergamides like LSD-Pip within its structure. 25B-NAcPip may or may not be a controlled substance in Canada as of 2025.

Chemical structures of 25B-NAcPip and related compounds
2C-B

25B-NBOMe

25B-NAcPip

25D-NM-NDEAOP

DOB-NDEPA

LSD

== See also ==
- Partial lysergamide
- List of miscellaneous 5-HT_{2A} receptor agonists
- 25D-NM-NDEAOP
- DEMPDHPCA-2C-D
