= C13H18F3NO3 =

The molecular formula C_{13}H_{18}F_{3}NO_{3} (molar mass : 293.286 g/mol) may refer to:

- MTFEM
- Trifluoroproscaline
- 3C-TFE
