= MTFEM =

Clinical data
- Other names: 4-(2,2,2-Trifluoroethoxy)-2,5-dimethoxyamphetamine; 2,5-Dimethoxy-4-(2,2,2-trifluoroethoxy)amphetamine
- Drug class: Serotonin 5-HT_{2} receptor modulator
- ATC code: None

Identifiers
- IUPAC name: 1-[2,5-dimethoxy-4-(2,2,2-trifluoroethoxy)phenyl]propan-2-amine
- PubChem CID: 172547198

Chemical and physical data
- Formula: C_{13}H_{18}F_{3}NO_{3}
- Molar mass: 293.286 g·mol^{−1}
- 3D model (JSmol): Interactive image
- SMILES: COc1cc(CC(N)C)c(cc1OCC(F)(F)F)OC
- InChI: InChI=1S/C13H18F3NO3/c1-8(17)4-9-5-11(19-3)12(6-10(9)18-2)20-7-13(14,15)16/h5-6,8H,4,7,17H2,1-3H3; Key:LFPUPGGEYLURDG-UHFFFAOYSA-N

MTFEM, also known as 4-(2,2,2-trifluoroethoxy)-2,5-dimethoxyamphetamine, is a serotonin receptor modulator of the phenethylamine, amphetamine, and DOx families. It is a derivative of the DOx psychedelics TMA-2 and MEM in which the 4-position substituent has been extended. The drug is also the α-methyl or amphetamine analogue of 2C-O-22.

== Use and effects ==
In humans, MTFEM produced stimulant effects at a dose of 2.5 mg and had a duration of 12 hours. Its full effects in humans were not determined and it was estimated that its human dose range would be 10 mg or more. Along with TMA-2 and MEM, it is one of the few compounds in its series tested and known to be active in humans.

== Pharmacology ==
=== Pharmacodynamics ===
MTFEM acts as a potent modulator of the serotonin 5-HT_{2} receptors. Its affinities (K_{i}) were 460 nM for the serotonin 5-HT_{2A} receptor and 2,400 nM for the serotonin 5-HT_{2C} receptor, whereas its activational potencies (EC_{50} (E_{max})) were 19 nM (80%) at the serotonin 5-HT_{2A} receptor and 200 nM (4.8%) at the serotonin 5-HT_{2B} receptor. Hence, MTFEM is a near-full agonist of the serotonin 5-HT_{2A} receptor but a near-silent antagonist of the serotonin 5-HT_{2B} receptor. Besides the serotonin 5-HT_{2} receptors, the drug showed little to no activity at various other assessed targets, such as the monoamine transporters. It does not appear to have been tested for psychedelic-like activity in animals.

== History ==
MTFEM was first described in the scientific literature by Daniel Trachsel in 2012. Its psychoactive effects in humans were reported by Trachsel and colleagues in 2013. Subsequently, it was characterized in more detail by a group including Trachsel and Matthias Liechti in 2019. The compound's name is said to derive from its benzene ring substituents, "methoxy trifluoroethoxy methoxy".

== Society and culture ==
=== Legal status ===
==== Canada ====
MTFEM is a controlled substance in Canada under phenethylamine blanket-ban language.

== See also ==
- DOx (psychedelics)
- MEM § Derivatives
