= MBM (drug) =

Clinical data
- Other names: 4-Butoxy-2,5-dimethoxyamphetamine; 2,5-Dimethoxy-4-butoxyamphetamine; TMA2-4-BuO
- Routes of administration: Oral
- Drug class: Serotonin receptor modulator; Serotonin 5-HT_{2A} receptor agonist
- ATC code: None

Pharmacokinetic data
- Duration of action: Unknown

Identifiers
- IUPAC name: 1-(4-butoxy-2,5-dimethoxyphenyl)propan-2-amine
- PubChem CID: 69456028
- ChemSpider: 129687355

Chemical and physical data
- Formula: C_{15}H_{25}NO_{3}
- Molar mass: 267.369 g·mol^{−1}
- 3D model (JSmol): Interactive image
- SMILES: CCCCOC1=C(C=C(C(=C1)OC)CC(C)N)OC
- InChI: InChI=1S/C15H25NO3/c1-5-6-7-19-15-10-13(17-3)12(8-11(2)16)9-14(15)18-4/h9-11H,5-8,16H2,1-4H3; Key:QKAUNHGCSPPQBX-UHFFFAOYSA-N

MBM, also known as 2,5-dimethoxy-4-butoxyamphetamine or as TMA2-4-BuO, is a serotonin receptor modulator of the phenethylamine, amphetamine, and DOx families. It is a derivative of the DOx psychedelics TMA-2 and MEM in which the 4-position substituent has been extended. According to Alexander Shulgin in his book PiHKAL (Phenethylamines I Have Known and Loved), MBM produced no effects at doses of up to 12 mg orally. Higher doses were not tested. As such, the properties and effects of MBM remain unknown. The drug is a potent full agonist of the serotonin 5-HT_{2A} and 5-HT_{2C} receptors (EC_{50} (E_{max}) = 26.9 nM (114%) and 57.4 nM (93%), respectively). Conversely, it is inactive as an agonist of the serotonin 5-HT_{2B} and 5-HT_{1A} receptors. The chemical synthesis of MBM has been described. MBM was first described in the literature by Shulgin in PiHKAL in 1991.

== See also ==
- DOx (psychedelics)
- MEM § Derivatives
- Buscaline
