= C13H19F2NO3 =

The molecular formula C_{13}H_{19}F_{2}NO_{3} (molar mass : 275.296 g/mol) may refer to:

- MDFEM
- 3C-DFE
