= 2,5-Dimethoxy-4-chloroamphetamine =

Chemical compound

DOC

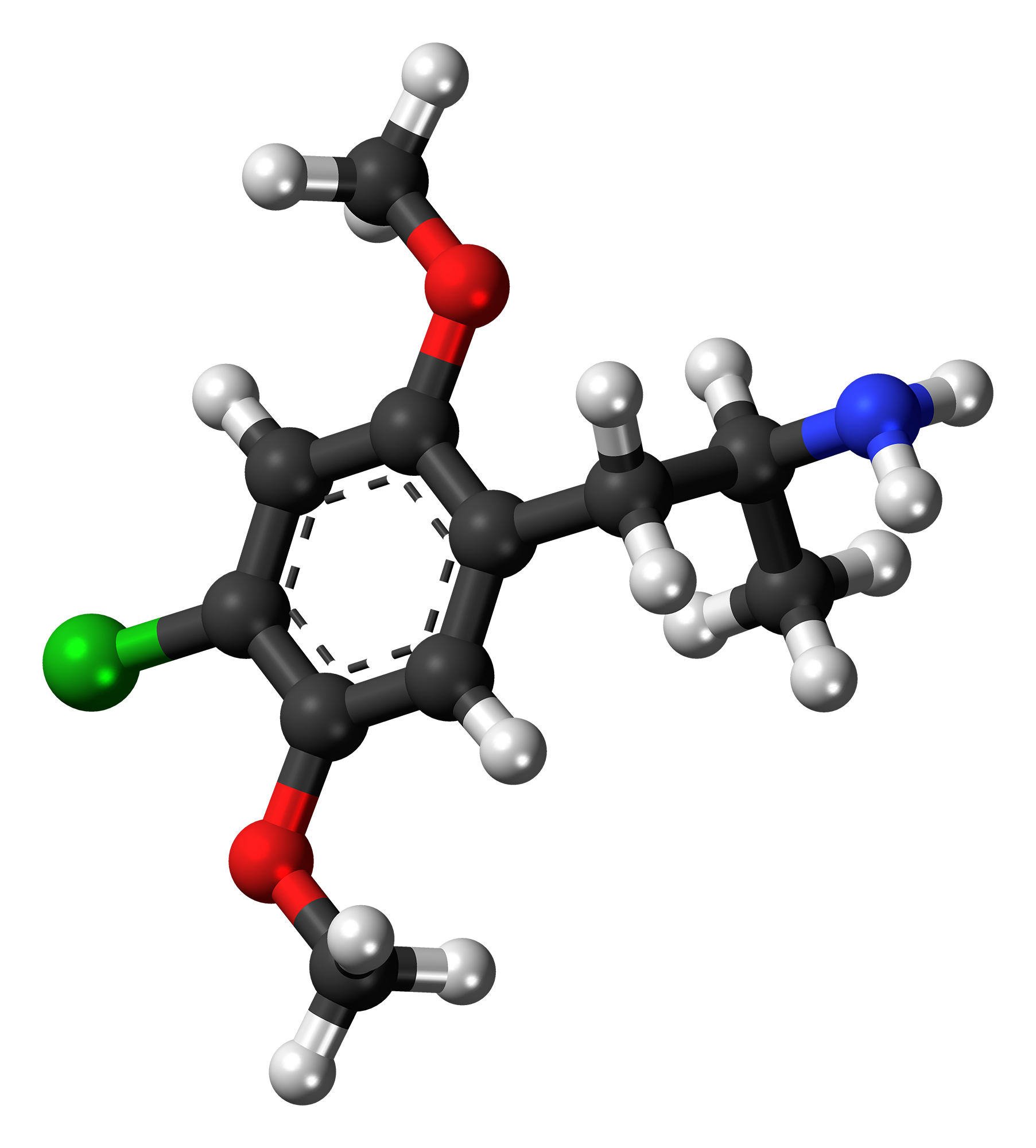

Clinical data
- Other names: DOC; 2,5-Dimethoxy-4-chloroamphetamine; 4-Chloro-2,5-dimethoxyamphetamine
- Routes of administration: Oral
- Drug class: Serotonin 5-HT_{2} receptor agonist; Serotonin 5-HT_{2A} receptor agonist; Serotonergic psychedelic; Hallucinogen

Legal status
- Legal status: AU: Unscheduled; BR: Class F2 (Prohibited psychotropics); CA: Schedule I; DE: Anlage I (Authorized scientific use only); UK: Class A; US: Unscheduled; UN: Psychotropic Schedule I

Pharmacokinetic data
- Duration of action: 12–24 hours

Identifiers
- IUPAC name: 1-(4-Chloro-2,5-dimethoxyphenyl)propan-2-amine
- CAS Number: 123431-31-2
- PubChem CID: 542036
- ChemSpider: 472008
- UNII: 8Y1C6K0PCA
- KEGG: C22719
- ChEMBL: ChEMBL8100
- CompTox Dashboard (EPA): DTXSID60894189
- ECHA InfoCard: 100.215.939

Chemical and physical data
- Formula: C_{11}H_{16}ClNO_{2}
- Molar mass: 229.70 g·mol^{−1}
- 3D model (JSmol): Interactive image
- SMILES: ClC1=C(OC)C=C(CC(C)N)C(OC)=C1
- InChI: InChI=1S/C11H16ClNO2/c1-7(13)4-8-5-11(15-3)9(12)6-10(8)14-2/h5-7H,4,13H2,1-3H3; Key:ACRITBNCBMTINK-UHFFFAOYSA-N

2,5-Dimethoxy-4-chloroamphetamine (DOC) is a psychedelic drug of the phenethylamine, amphetamine, and DOx families. It is taken orally.

The drug acts as a serotonin 5-HT_{2} receptor agonist, including of the serotonin 5-HT_{2A} receptor. Analogues of DOC include 2C-C, DOB, DOI, DOM, among others.

DOC was first described in the scientific literature by Ronald Coutts and Jerry Malicky in 1973. Subsequently, it was described in greater detail by Alexander Shulgin in his 1991 book PiHKAL (Phenethylamines I Have Known and Loved). Recreational availability and use of DOC are rare. The drug is expected to become a controlled substance in the United States in the near future as of 2025.

== Use and effects ==
In his book PiHKAL (Phenethylamines I Have Known and Loved), Alexander Shulgin lists DOC's dose as 1.5 to 3 mg orally and its duration as 12 to 24 hours. The effects of DOC have been reported to include closed-eye imagery, visuals, introspection, lightheadedness, disconnectedness, and spaciness, among others. In one of the reports, it was described as an "archetypical psychedelic", with the full spectrum of psychedelic effects. This was contrasted with 2C psychedelics, which were described as more subtle and gentle.

== Toxicity ==
Very little data exists about the toxicity of DOC. In April 2013, a case of death due to DOC was reported. The source does not specify whether the drug alone caused the death. In 2014, a death was reported in which DOC was directly implicated as the sole causative agent in the death of a user. The autopsy indicated pulmonary edema and a subgaleal hemorrhage.

== Pharmacology ==
=== Pharmacodynamics ===
==== Actions ====
DOC activities
Target	Affinity (K_{i}, nM)
5-HT_{1A}	5,353–>9,200 (K_{i}) >10,000 (EC_{50}) <10% (E_{max})
5-HT_{1B}	ND
5-HT_{1D}	ND
5-HT_{1E}	ND
5-HT_{1F}	ND
5-HT_{2A}	1.4–12 (K_{i}); 0.6–11 (EC_{50}); 58–102% (E_{max})
5-HT_{2B}	32 (K_{i}); 46 (EC_{50}); 83% (E_{max})
5-HT_{2C}	2–143 (K_{i}); 15 (EC_{50}); 97% (E_{max})
5-HT_{3}	ND
5-HT_{4}	ND
5-HT_{5A}	ND
5-HT_{6}	ND
5-HT_{7}	ND
α_{1A}	>1,000
α_{1B}–α_{1D}	ND
α_{2A}	>1,000
α_{2B}–α_{2C}	ND
β_{1}–β_{3}	ND
D_{1}	ND
D_{2}	>1,000
D_{3}–D_{5}	ND
TAAR_{1}	>1,000
SERT	>10,000 (K_{i}) >8,600 (IC_{50}); Minimal (EC_{50})
NET	>7,700 (K_{i}) >8,400 (IC_{50}); Minimal (EC_{50})
DAT	>10,000 (K_{i}) >10,000 (IC_{50}); Minimal (EC_{50})
Notes: The smaller the value, the more avidly the drug binds to the site. All proteins are human unless otherwise specified. Refs:

DOC acts as a serotonin 5-HT_{2A} and 5-HT_{2C} receptor agonist. Its psychedelic effects are mediated via its actions on the 5-HT_{2A} receptor.

The drug is inactive as a monoamine releasing agent and reuptake inhibitor.

==== Effects ====
DOC produces the head-twitch response, a behavioral proxy of psychedelic-like effects, in rodents.

DOC has shown reinforcing effects, including conditioned place preference (CPP) and self-administration, in rodents similarly to methamphetamine. This is analogous to other findings in which various 2C and NBOMe drugs have been found to produce dopaminergic elevations and reinforcing effects in rodents. Conversely however, in contrast to amphetamines like (−)-cathinone but similarly to mescaline, DOM has shown no stimulant-like or reinforcing effects in rhesus monkeys.

== Chemistry ==
DOC is a substituted α-methylated phenethylamine, a class of compounds commonly known as amphetamines. The phenethylamine equivalent (lacking the α-methyl group) is 2C-C. DOC has a stereocenter and (R)-(−)-DOC is the more active stereoisomer.

=== Synthesis ===
The chemical synthesis of DOC has been described.

=== Detection ===
DOC may be quantitated in blood, plasma or urine by gas chromatography-mass spectrometry or liquid chromatography-mass spectrometry to confirm a diagnosis of poisoning in hospitalized patients or to provide evidence in a medicolegal death investigation. Blood or plasma DOC concentrations are expected to be in a range of 1–10 μg/L in persons using the drug recreationally, >20 μg/L in intoxicated patients and >100 μg/L in victims of acute overdosage.

=== Analogues ===
Analogues of DOC include DOB, DOI, 2C-C, DODC, and ZDCM-04, among others.

== History ==
DOC was first described in the scientific literature by Ronald Coutts and Jerry Malicky in 1973. Subsequently, it was described in greater detail by Alexander Shulgin in his 1991 book PiHKAL (Phenethylamines i Have Known And Loved).

== Society and culture ==
=== Popularity ===
Although rare on the black market, it has been available in bulk and shipped worldwide by select elite "Grey Market" Research Chemical suppliers for several years. Sales of DOC on blotting paper and in capsules was reported in late 2005 and again in late 2007. According to the DEA's Microgram from December 2007, the Concord Police Department in Contra Costa County, California, in the US, seized "a small piece of crudely lined white blotter paper without any design, suspected LSD 'blotter acid'". They added "Unusually, the paper appeared to be hand-lined using two pens, in squares measuring approximately 6 x 6 millimeters. The paper displayed fluorescence when irradiated at 365 nanometers; however, color testing for LSD with para-dimethylaminobenzaldehyde (Ehrlich's reagent) was negative. Analysis of a methanol extract by GC/MS indicated not LSD but rather DOC (not quantitated but a high loading based on the TIC)". DOC is sometimes misrepresented as LSD by unscrupulous dealers. This is particularly dangerous, as DOC is not known to have the safety profile of LSD. It can be particularly unsafe, in comparison to LSD, for those suffering from hypertension, as amphetamine compounds are known to cause sharp increases in systolic blood pressure.

=== Legal status ===
==== International ====
In December 2019, the UNODC announced scheduling recommendations placing DOC into Schedule I alongside another several research chemicals.

==== Australia ====
Unscheduled but can be controlled as schedule II as an analogue of DOB.

==== Canada ====
Listed as a Schedule 1 as it is an analogue of amphetamine. The CDSA was updated as a result of the Safe Streets Act changing amphetamines from Schedule 3 to Schedule 1.

==== China ====
As of October 2015 DOC is a controlled substance in China.

==== Denmark ====
Denmark added DOC to the list of Schedule I controlled substances as of 8.4.2007.

==== Germany ====
Scheduled in Anlage I since 22.1.2010.

==== New Zealand ====
Scheduled.

==== Sweden ====
Sveriges riksdag added DOC to schedule I ("substances, plant materials and fungi which normally do not have medical use") as narcotics in Sweden as of Aug 30, 2007, published by Medical Products Agency in their regulation LVFS 2007:10 listed as DOC, 4-klor-2,5-dimetoxi-amfetamin. DOC was first classified by Sveriges riksdags health ministry Statens folkhälsoinstitut as "health hazard" under the act Lagen om förbud mot vissa hälsofarliga varor (translated Act on the Prohibition of Certain Goods Dangerous to Health) as of Jul 1, 2004, in their regulation SFS 2004:486 listed as 4-klor-2,5-dimetoxiamfetamin (DOC).

==== United Kingdom ====
Class A.

==== United States ====
DOC is not scheduled or controlled at the federal level in the United States, but the Department of Justice considers it to be an analogue of DOB and, as such, possession or sale could be prosecuted under the Federal Analogue Act. In December 2023, the US Drug Enforcement Administration issued a notice of proposed rulemaking that would classify both 2,5-dimethoxy-4-chloroamphetamine and 2,5-dimethoxy-4-iodoamphetamine as schedule I controlled substances.

In the United States, the analogues DMA, DOB, and DOM are Schedule I controlled substances.

===== Florida =====
DOC is a Schedule I controlled substance in the state of Florida making it illegal to buy, sell, or possess.

== See also ==
- DOx (psychedelics)
