= 2C-C =

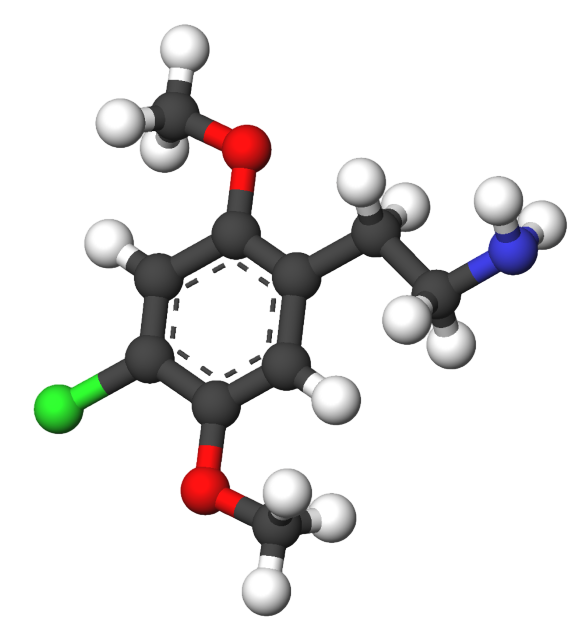

Clinical data
- Other names: 2,5-Dimethoxy-4-chlorophenethylamine; 4-Chloro-2,5-dimethoxyphenethylamine
- Routes of administration: Oral
- Drug class: Serotonin 5-HT_{2} receptor agonist; Serotonergic psychedelic; Hallucinogen
- ATC code: None

Legal status
- Legal status: BR: Class F2 (Prohibited psychotropics); CA: Schedule III; DE: Anlage I (Authorized scientific use only); US: Schedule I

Pharmacokinetic data
- Onset of action: 1.5–2 hours
- Duration of action: 4–8 hours

Identifiers
- IUPAC name: 2-(4-chloro-2,5-dimethoxyphenyl)ethan-1-amine
- CAS Number: 88441-14-9
- PubChem CID: 29979100
- ChemSpider: 21106221
- UNII: 0RO7MZY2LS
- ChEMBL: ChEMBL124733
- CompTox Dashboard (EPA): DTXSID80893699
- ECHA InfoCard: 100.218.153

Chemical and physical data
- Formula: C_{10}H_{14}ClNO_{2}
- Molar mass: 215.68 g·mol^{−1}
- 3D model (JSmol): Interactive image
- Melting point: 220 to 221 °C (428 to 430 °F) (hydrochloride)
- SMILES: COc1cc(CCN)c(cc1Cl)OC
- InChI: InChI=1S/C10H14ClNO2/c1-13-9-6-8(11)10(14-2)5-7(9)3-4-12/h5-6H,3-4,12H2,1-2H3; Key:CGKQFIWIPSIVAS-UHFFFAOYSA-N

2C-C, also known as 4-chloro-2,5-dimethoxyphenethylamine, is a psychedelic drug of the phenethylamine and 2C families. It is taken orally.

2C-C was first described in the scientific literature by Alice Cheng and Neal Castagnoli in 1984. It was described in greater detail by Alexander Shulgin in his 1991 book PiHKAL (Phenethylamines I Have Known and Loved). The drug is Schedule I of section 202(c) of the Controlled Substances Act in the United States, signed into law as of July 2012 under the Food and Drug Administration Safety and Innovation Act.

== Use and effects ==
In his book PiHKAL (Phenethylamines I Have Known and Loved), Alexander Shulgin lists 2C-C's dose range as 20 to 40 mg orally and its duration as 4 to 8 hours. Its onset is described as delayed compared to 2C-B and as being 1.5 to 2 hours. In addition to oral administration, a single report of 20 mg by intravenous injection was described as overwhelming, with effects peaking after 5 minutes and lasting perhaps 15 minutes. The effects of 2C-C have been reported to include psychedelic visuals, sensual enhancement, stimulation, sedation, and relaxation, among others. Its stimulating effects are said to be less than those of 2C-B and it is said to be sedating in some ways.

== Interactions ==
2C drugs like 2C-C are known to be metabolized by the monoamine oxidase (MAO) enzymes MAO-A and MAO-B. Monoamine oxidase inhibitors (MAOIs) such as phenelzine, tranylcypromine, moclobemide, and selegiline may potentiate the effects of 2C drugs like 2C-C. This may result in overdose and serious toxicity.

== Pharmacology ==
=== Pharmacodynamics ===
2C-C activities
Target	Affinity (K_{i}, nM)
5-HT_{1A}	190–740 (K_{i}) >10,000 (EC_{50}) <25% (E_{max})
5-HT_{1B}	ND
5-HT_{1D}	ND
5-HT_{1E}	ND
5-HT_{1F}	ND
5-HT_{2A}	5.47–13 (K_{i}); 9.27–200 (EC_{50}); 49–102% (E_{max})
5-HT_{2B}	ND (K_{i}); 280 (EC_{50}); 81% (E_{max})
5-HT_{2C}	5.4–90 (K_{i}); 24.2 (EC_{50}); 94% (E_{max})
5-HT_{3}	ND
5-HT_{4}	ND
5-HT_{5A}	ND
5-HT_{6}	ND
5-HT_{7}	ND
α_{1A}	13,000
α_{1B}, α_{1D}	ND
α_{2A}	530
α_{2B}, α_{2C}	ND
β_{1}–β_{3}	ND
D_{1}	13,000
D_{2}	2,100
D_{3}	17,000
D_{4}	ND
D_{5}	ND
H_{1}	14,000
H_{2}–H_{4}	ND
M_{1}–M_{5}	ND
I_{1}	ND
σ_{1}, σ_{2}	ND
TAAR1	4,100 (K_{i}) (mouse); 110 (K_{i}) (rat); 2,300 (EC_{50}) (mouse); 340 (EC_{50}) (rat) >10,000 (EC_{50}) (human); 57% (E_{max}) (mouse); 51% (E_{max}) (rat)
SERT	24,000 (K_{i}); 72,000–74,000 (IC_{50}) >100,000 (EC_{50}) (rat)
NET	>30,000 (K_{i}); 63,000–93,000 (IC_{50}); 100,000 (EC_{50}) (rat)
DAT	>30,000 (K_{i}); 305,000 (IC_{50}) >100,000 (EC_{50}) (rat)
MAO-A	ND (IC_{50})
MAO-B	ND (IC_{50})
Notes: The smaller the value, the more avidly the drug binds to the site. All proteins are human unless otherwise specified. Refs:

2C-C acts as an agonist of the serotonin 5-HT_{2} receptors. It also binds to the serotonin 5-HT_{1A} receptor with 15-fold lower affinity than for the serotonin 5-HT_{2A} receptor. The drug shows little or no affinity for the monoamine transporters (MATs) and shows very weak or negligible monoamine reuptake inhibition. It shows high affinity for the rat trace amine-associated receptor 1 (TAAR1), but only weak affinity for the mouse TAAR1.

In contrast to many other psychedelics, 2C-C, as well as 2C-P and certain 2C NBOMe analogues, has shown reinforcing effects in rodents. It produces dose-dependent conditioned place preference (CPP) in mice and self-administration in rats. These findings suggest that 2C-C may have misuse potential. The mechanism by which these effects are produced is unknown. However, 2C-C was found to decrease dopamine transporter (DAT) expression and to increase DAT phosphorylation in the nucleus accumbens and medial prefrontal cortex (mPFC) similarly to methamphetamine in rodents. Decreased DAT expression may result in reduced dopamine reuptake, while DAT phosphorylation is associated with dopamine reverse transport and efflux, in turn increasing extracellular dopamine levels.

2C-C has also been found to produce neurotoxicity at high doses in rodents, which appears to be mediated via neuroinflammation.

== Chemistry ==
=== Synthesis ===
The chemical synthesis of 2C-C has been described.

=== Analogues ===
Analogues of 2C-C include 2C-B, 2C-I, DOC, and 25C-NBOMe, among others.

== History ==
2C-C was first described in the scientific literature by Alice Cheng and Neal Castagnoli in 1984. It was described in greater detail, including its properties and effects in humans, by Alexander Shulgin in his 1991 book PiHKAL (Phenethylamines I Have Known and Loved).

== Society and culture ==
=== Legal status ===
==== Canada ====
As of October 31, 2016; 2C-C is a controlled substance (Schedule III) in Canada.

==== China ====
As of October 2015 2C-C is a controlled substance in China.

==== Finland ====
Scheduled in the "government decree on psychoactive substances banned from the consumer market".

==== Germany ====
2C-C is an Anlage I controlled drug.

==== Sweden ====
Sveriges riksdags health ministry Statens folkhälsoinstitut classified 2C-C as "health hazard" under the act Lagen om förbud mot vissa hälsofarliga varor (translated Act on the Prohibition of Certain Goods Dangerous to Health) as of Mar 1, 2005, in their regulation SFS 2005:26 listed as 2,5-dimetoxi-4-klorfenetylamin (2C-C), making it illegal to sell or possess.

==== United States ====
As of July 9, 2012, in the United States 2C-C is a Schedule I substance under the Food and Drug Administration Safety and Innovation Act of 2012, making possession, distribution and manufacture illegal.

== See also ==
- 2C (psychedelics)
