= DOPF =

Substituted amphetamine designer drug

Clinical data
- Other names: DOPF; 2,5-Dimethoxy-4-(3-fluoropropyl)amphetamine; 4-(3-Fluoropropyl)-2,5-dimethoxyamphetamine
- Routes of administration: Unknown

Pharmacokinetic data
- Duration of action: Unknown

Identifiers
- IUPAC name: 2-[4-(3-fluoropropyl)-2,5-dimethoxyphenyl]ethanamine
- PubChem CID: 163192484
- ChemSpider: 129558527
- CompTox Dashboard (EPA): DTXSID001337046

Chemical and physical data
- Formula: C_{14}H_{22}FNO_{2}
- Molar mass: 255.333 g·mol^{−1}
- 3D model (JSmol): Interactive image
- SMILES: COc1cc(CCCF)c(cc1CC(C)N)OC
- InChI: InChI=1S/C14H22FNO2/c1-10(16)7-12-9-13(17-2)11(5-4-6-15)8-14(12)18-3/h8-10H,4-7,16H2,1-3H3; Key:UIHSFMYQJAKMHD-UHFFFAOYSA-N

DOPF, also known as 2,5-dimethoxy-4-(3-fluoropropyl)amphetamine, is a designer drug from the amphetamine and DOx families. It was first synthesised by Alexander Shulgin and David Nichols in 1989 but was never published at the time, and was finally disclosed in Daniel Trachsel's review of the field in 2013. It has a binding affinity (K_{i}) of 9 nM at the serotonin receptor 5-HT_{2A} but is not known to have been tested in humans. DOPF is a controlled substance in Canada under phenethylamine blanket-ban language.

== See also ==
- DOx (psychedelics)
- DOBU
- DOEF
- DOPR
- DOTFM
- 2C-TFE
- 2C-T-21
- 2C-T-28
