= MAM (drug) =

Clinical data
- Other names: 4-Pentyloxy-2,5-dimethoxyamphetamine; 2,5-Dimethoxy-4-pentyloxyamphetamine; 4-Amyloxy-2,5-dimethoxyamphetamine; 2,5-Dimethoxy-4-amyloxyamphetamine; TMA2-4-PeO
- Routes of administration: Oral
- ATC code: None

Pharmacokinetic data
- Duration of action: Unknown

Identifiers
- IUPAC name: 1-[2,5-dimethoxy-4-(pentyloxy)phenyl]propan-2-amine

Chemical and physical data
- Formula: C_{16}H_{27}NO_{3}
- Molar mass: 281.396 g·mol^{−1}
- 3D model (JSmol): Interactive image
- SMILES: CCCCCOC(C=C1OC)=C(OC)C=C1CC(N)C
- InChI: InChI=1S/C16H27NO3/c1-5-6-7-8-20-16-11-14(18-3)13(9-12(2)17)10-15(16)19-4/h10-12H,5-9,17H2,1-4H3; Key:BJNHWPMJOQBFLT-UHFFFAOYSA-N

MAM, also known as 2,5-dimethoxy-4-pentyloxyamphetamine or as TMA2-4-PeO, is a chemical compound of the phenethylamine, amphetamine, and DOx families. It is a derivative of the DOx psychedelics TMA-2 and MEM in which the 4-position substituent has been extended. According to Alexander Shulgin in his book PiHKAL (Phenethylamines I Have Known and Loved), MAM produced a brief heaviness in the chest and head at a dose of 16 mg orally. However, it caused no other effects, for instance psychoactive effects, cardiovascular disturbances, or pupil dilation, and was deemed inactive up to that dose level. Higher doses were not tested. As such, the properties and effects of MAM remain unknown. The chemical synthesis of MAM has been described. MAM was first described in the literature by Shulgin in PiHKAL in 1991.

== See also ==
- DOx (psychedelics)
- MEM § Derivatives
- DOAM
