= 2C-F =

Chemical compound

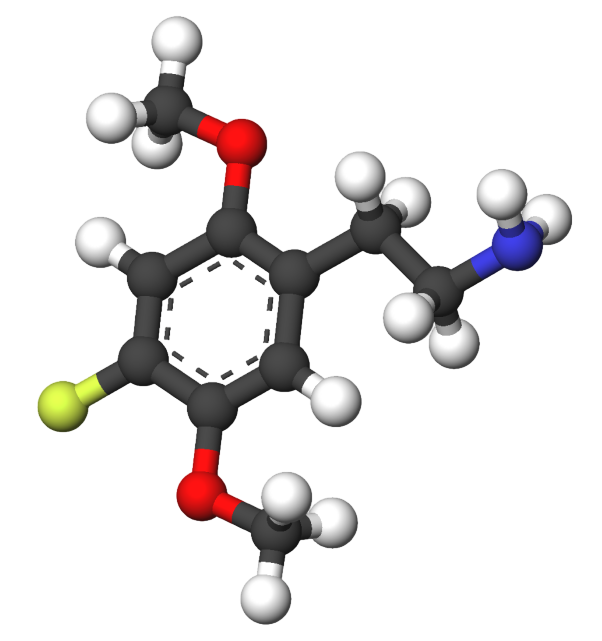

Clinical data
- Other names: 4-Fluoro-2,5-dimethoxyphenethylamine; 2,5-Dimethoxy-4-fluorophenethylamine
- Routes of administration: Oral
- Drug class: Serotonergic psychedelic; Hallucinogen
- ATC code: None

Legal status
- Legal status: BR: Class F2 (Prohibited psychotropics); CA: Schedule III; UK: Class A

Pharmacokinetic data
- Onset of action: Unknown
- Duration of action: Unknown

Identifiers
- IUPAC name: 2-(4-fluoro-2,5-dimethoxyphenyl)-1-aminoethane
- CAS Number: 207740-15-6
- PubChem CID: 44719499
- ChemSpider: 21106223
- UNII: O01SQJ93TV
- CompTox Dashboard (EPA): DTXSID70660357

Chemical and physical data
- Formula: C_{10}H_{14}FNO_{2}
- Molar mass: 199.225 g·mol^{−1}
- 3D model (JSmol): Interactive image
- SMILES: Fc1cc(OC)c(cc1OC)CCN
- InChI: InChI=1S/C10H14FNO2/c1-13-9-6-8(11)10(14-2)5-7(9)3-4-12/h5-6H,3-4,12H2,1-2H3; Key:QAVFEDRVOUKIPM-UHFFFAOYSA-N

2C-F, also known as 4-fluoro-2,5-dimethoxyphenethylamine, is a psychedelic drug of the phenethylamine and 2C families. It is taken orally.

== Use effects ==
In his book PiHKAL (Phenethylamines I Have Known and Loved), Alexander Shulgin lists the dose of 2C-F as greater than 250 mg orally and its duration as unknown. At a dose of 250 mg orally, 2C-F produced slight and uncertain effects including possible modest closed-eye visuals and pleasant lethargy. However, Daniel Trachsel, based on the existing literature, described 2C-F as being essentially inactive at this dose.

== Pharmacology ==
Very little data exists about the pharmacological properties, metabolism, and toxicity of 2C-F.

== Chemistry ==
=== Properties ===
2C-F may be found as a brownish freebase oil, or as a white crystalline hydrochloride salt.

=== Synthesis ===
The chemical synthesis of 2C-F has been described.

=== Analogues ===
Analogues of 2C-F include 2C-B, 2C-I, 2C-C, DOF, and 25F-NBOMe, among others.

== History ==
2C-F was first described in the literature by Alexander Shulgin in his 1991 book PiHKAL (Phenethylamines I Have Known and Loved).

== Society and culture ==
=== Legal status ===
==== Canada ====
As of October 31, 2016, 2C-F is a controlled substance (Schedule III) in Canada.

==== United States ====
2C-F is not an explicitly controlled substance in the United States. However, it could be considered a controlled substance under the Federal Analogue Act if intended for human consumption.

== See also ==
- 2C (psychedelics)
