= 2,5-Dimethoxy-4-(2-fluoroethyl)amphetamine =

DOEF

Clinical data
- Other names: DOEF; 2,5-Dimethoxy-4-(2-fluoroethyl)amphetamine; 4-(2-Fluoroethyl)-2,5-dimethoxyamphetamine
- Routes of administration: Oral
- Drug class: Serotonergic psychedelic; Hallucinogen
- ATC code: None

Pharmacokinetic data
- Onset of action: 1–2 hours Peak: 3 hours
- Duration of action: 12–16 hours

Identifiers
- IUPAC name: 1-[4-(2-fluoroethyl)-2,5-dimethoxyphenyl]propan-2-amine
- CAS Number: 121649-01-2
- PubChem CID: 14201982
- ChemSpider: 21106293
- UNII: 72UT55MXE3
- ChEMBL: ChEMBL123685
- CompTox Dashboard (EPA): DTXSID00557322

Chemical and physical data
- Formula: C_{13}H_{20}FNO_{2}
- Molar mass: 241.306 g·mol^{−1}
- 3D model (JSmol): Interactive image
- SMILES: C1(=CC(=C(C=C1CC(C)N)OC)CCF)OC
- InChI: InChI=1S/C13H20FNO2/c1-9(15)6-11-8-12(16-2)10(4-5-14)7-13(11)17-3/h7-9H,4-6,15H2,1-3H3; Key:QLENKWFQUHHBKZ-UHFFFAOYSA-N

2,5-Dimethoxy-4-(2-fluoroethyl)amphetamine (DOEF) is a psychedelic drug of the phenethylamine, amphetamine, and DOx families.

== Use and effects ==
In his book PiHKAL (Phenethylamines I Have Known and Loved), Alexander Shulgin lists DOEF's dose as 2 to 3.5 mg orally and its duration as 12 to 16 hours. The drug's onset was 1 to 2 hours and peak effects occurred after 3 hours. The effects of DOEF were reported to include unworldliness, closed-eye imagery no appreciable open-eye visuals or not highly visual, time dilation, music and erotic enhancement, no body discomfort, insomnia, and sleep disruption, among others.

== Chemistry ==
=== Synthesis ===
The chemical synthesis of DOEF has been described.

=== Analogues ===
Analogues of DOEF include 2C-EF, DOET, DOTFE, DOPF, and DOTFM, among others.

== History ==
DOEF was first described in the scientific literature by Alexander Shulgin and colleagues in 1988. Subsequently, it was described in greater detail by Shulgin in PiHKAL in 1991.

== Society and culture ==
=== Legal status ===
DOEF is a controlled substance in Canada under phenethylamine blanket-ban language.

== See also ==
- DOx (psychedelics)
