= 2,5-Dimethoxy-4-ethoxyamphetamine =

Psychedelic drug

MEM

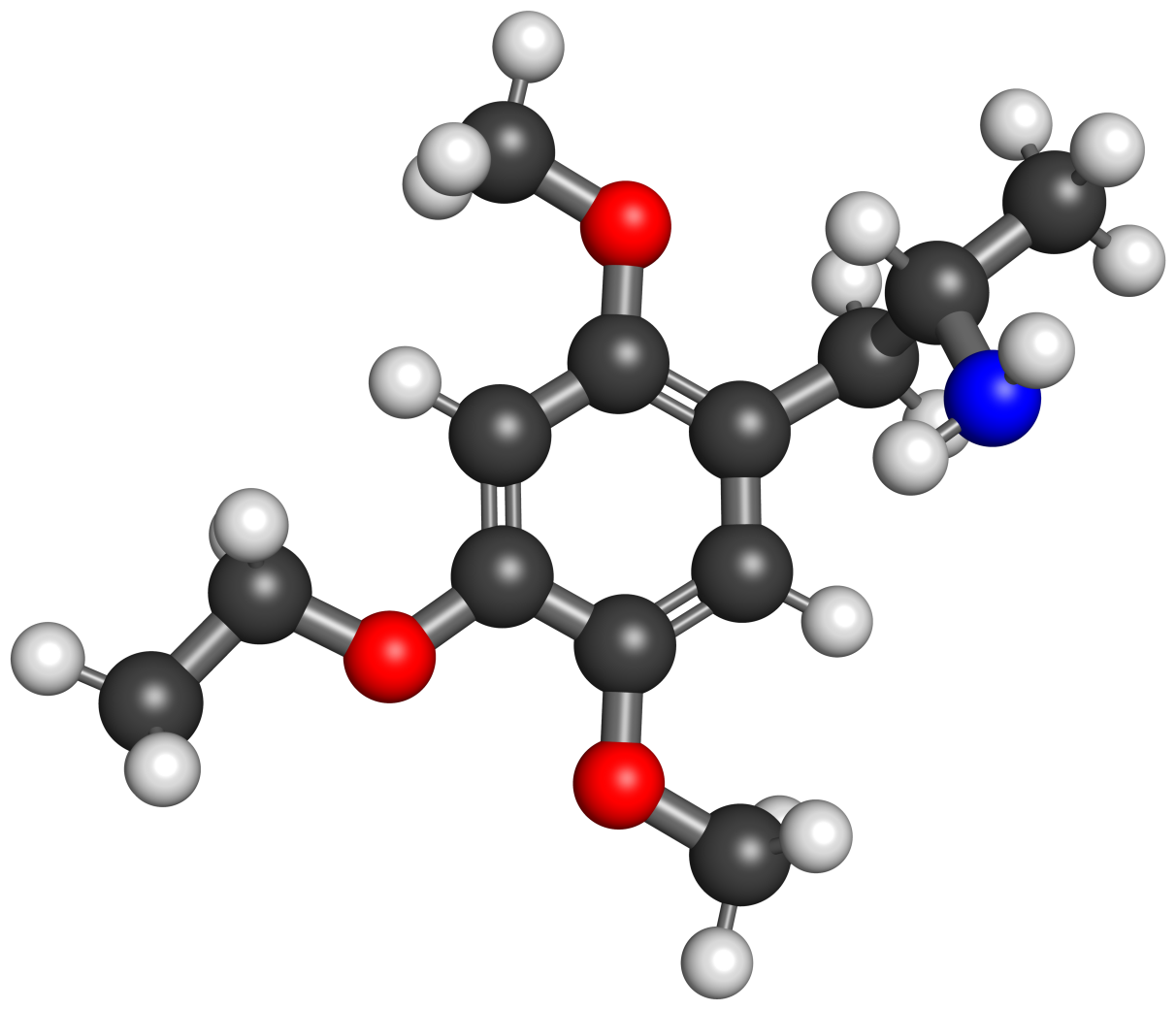

Clinical data
- Other names: 2,5-Dimethoxy-4-ethoxyamphetamine; 4-Ethoxy-2,5-dimethoxyamphetamine; MEM; TMA2-4-EtO
- Routes of administration: Oral
- Drug class: Serotonin receptor agonist; Serotonin 5-HT_{2} receptor agonist; Serotonergic psychedelic; Hallucinogen
- ATC code: None

Legal status
- Legal status: CA: Schedule I; UK: Class B

Pharmacokinetic data
- Duration of action: 10–14 hours

Identifiers
- IUPAC name: 1-[(4-ethoxy-2,5-dimethoxy)phenyl]propan-2-amine
- CAS Number: 16128-88-4
- PubChem CID: 542053
- ChemSpider: 472023
- UNII: 3I0ORO8174
- ChEMBL: ChEMBL8225
- CompTox Dashboard (EPA): DTXSID00337348

Chemical and physical data
- Formula: C_{13}H_{21}NO_{3}
- Molar mass: 239.315 g·mol^{−1}
- 3D model (JSmol): Interactive image
- SMILES: O(c1cc(OC)c(cc1OC)CC(N)C)CC
- InChI: InChI=1S/C13H21NO3/c1-5-17-13-8-11(15-3)10(6-9(2)14)7-12(13)16-4/h7-9H,5-6,14H2,1-4H3; Key:ITZLAXJQDMGDEO-UHFFFAOYSA-N

MEM, also known as 2,5-dimethoxy-4-ethoxyamphetamine or as TMA2-4-EtO, is a psychedelic drug of the phenethylamine, amphetamine, and DOx families related to TMA-2. It is the analogue of TMA-2 in which the methoxy group at the 4 position has been replaced with an ethoxy group. The drug was first described in the scientific literature by Alexander Shulgin by 1968.

== Use and effects ==
In his book PiHKAL (Phenethylamines I Have Known and Loved), Alexander Shulgin lists MEM's dose as 20 to 50 mg orally and its duration as 10 to 14 hours. Its onset is rapid at 10 to 30 minutes and peak effects occur at about 1.5 hours. The first noticeable decrease in effects occurred at 6 hours and the decline is slow. The effects of MEM have been reported to include visual phenomena, color and contrast enhancement, introspection and fantasy, lucidity or clarity, insights, good feelings or pleasantness, euphoria, lots of energy, need to keep moving and hard to stay still, eroticism, and tactile sensitivity. It was described as being "intense yet serene". Other effects of MEM included physical discomfort, queasiness, tremors, bodily sensitivity, and difficulty sleeping. MEM has sometimes been combined with MDMA for the purpose of lessening MEM's physical side effects.

== Pharmacology ==
=== Pharmacodynamics ===
MEM activities
Target	Affinity (K_{i}, nM)
5-HT_{1A}	>10,000
5-HT_{1B}	>10,000
5-HT_{1D}	>10,000
5-HT_{1E}	>10,000
5-HT_{1F}	ND
5-HT_{2A}	73.0–3,948 (K_{i}); 47.5–295 (EC_{50}); 88–105% (E_{max})
5-HT_{2B}	64.5–763 (K_{i}); 437–557 (EC_{50}); 70–96% (E_{max})
5-HT_{2C}	124–>10,000 (K_{i}); 29.9–248 (EC_{50}); 98–129% (E_{max})
5-HT_{3}	>10,000
5-HT_{4}	ND
5-HT_{5A}	>10,000
5-HT_{6}	>10,000
5-HT_{7}	7,156
α_{1A}, α_{1B}	>10,000
α_{1D}	ND
α_{2A}–α_{2C}	>10,000
β_{1}, β_{2}	>10,000
β_{3}	ND
D_{1}–D_{5}	>10,000
H_{1}–H_{4}	>10,000
M_{1}–M_{5}	>10,000
I_{1}	>10,000
σ_{1}	5,077
σ_{2}	>10,000
TAAR1	ND
SERT	>10,000 (K_{i})
NET	>10,000 (K_{i})
DAT	>10,000 (K_{i})
Notes: The smaller the value, the more avidly the drug binds to the site. All proteins are human unless otherwise specified. Refs:

MEM is a serotonergic psychedelic and acts as a selective serotonin 5-HT_{2} receptor agonist. It is specifically a full agonist of the serotonin 5-HT_{2A} and 5-HT_{2C} receptors and to a lesser extent is a partial to full agonist of the serotonin 5-HT_{2B} receptor. The psychedelic effects of MEM are thought to be mediated by serotonin 5-HT_{2A} receptor activation.

== Chemistry ==
MEM, also known as 2,5-dimethoxy-4-ethoxyamphetamine, is a phenethylamine, amphetamine, and DOx derivative. It is the analogue and derivative of 2,4,5-trimethoxyamphetamine (TMA-2) in which a 4-ethoxy group is present instead of a 4-methoxy group.

=== Synthesis ===
The chemical synthesis of MEM has been described.

=== Derivatives ===
A variety of derivatives of MEM have been developed and studied, not only by Alexander Shulgin but also by for instance Daniel Trachsel and colleagues. These include MPM, MIPM, MALM, MBM, MAM, MMALM, MFEM, MDFEM, and MTFEM, among others.

== History ==
MEM was first synthesized by Alexander Shulgin. It was first described by him in the scientific literature by 1968. Subsequently, Shulgin described MEM in greater detail in his 1991 book PiHKAL (Phenethylamines I Have Known and Loved).

== Society and culture ==
=== Legal status ===
==== Canada ====
MEM is a controlled substance in Canada.

==== United States ====
MEM is not an explicitly controlled substance in the United States. However, it could be considered a controlled substance under the Federal Analogue Act if intended for human consumption.

== See also ==
- DOx (psychedelics)
- TWEETIO § DOx compounds
- EMM and MME
