= 2,5-Dimethoxy-4-acetylamphetamine =

DOAc

Clinical data
- Other names: 2,5-Dimethoxy-4-acetylamphetamine; 4-Acetyl-2,5-dimethoxyamphetamine; DOAc; DOAC
- Drug class: Serotonin 5-HT_{2} receptor modulator
- ATC code: None

Identifiers
- IUPAC name: 1-[4-(2-aminopropyl)-2,5-dimethoxyphenyl]ethanone
- PubChem CID: 23983771
- ChemSpider: 34948069

Chemical and physical data
- Formula: C_{13}H_{19}NO_{3}
- Molar mass: 237.299 g·mol^{−1}
- 3D model (JSmol): Interactive image
- SMILES: CC(CC1=CC(=C(C=C1OC)C(=O)C)OC)N
- InChI: InChI=1S/C13H19NO3/c1-8(14)5-10-6-13(17-4)11(9(2)15)7-12(10)16-3/h6-8H,5,14H2,1-4H3; Key:NWWLLPGDGZOZAT-UHFFFAOYSA-N

2,5-Dimethoxy-4-acetylamphetamine (DOAc) is a serotonin 5-HT_{2} receptor modulator of the amphetamine and DOx families. Its affinities (K_{i}) for the human serotonin 5-HT_{2} receptors are 80.5 nM for the serotonin 5-HT_{2A} receptor, 313 nM for the serotonin 5-HT_{2B} receptor, and 91.3 nM for the serotonin 5-HT_{2C} receptor. These affinities are much lower than those of many other DOx derivatives, such as DOB, but are very similar to those of 3,4,5-trimethoxyamphetamine (TMA). DOAc is a controlled substance in Canada under phenethylamine blanket-ban language.

== See also ==
- DOx (psychedelics)
