= 25F-NBOMe =

Clinical data
- Other names: 2C-F-NBOMe; NBOMe-2C-F; N-(2-Methoxybenzyl)-4-fluoro-2,5-dimethoxyphenethylamine
- Drug class: Serotonin 5-HT_{2} receptor agonist; Possible serotonergic psychedelic; Possible hallucinogen
- ATC code: None

Identifiers
- IUPAC name: 2-(4-fluoro-2,5-dimethoxyphenyl)-N-[(2-methoxyphenyl)methyl]ethanamine
- CAS Number: 1373917-84-0 1539266-23-3 (hydrochloride)
- PubChem CID: 121230755

Chemical and physical data
- Formula: C_{18}H_{22}FNO_{3}
- Molar mass: 319.376 g·mol^{−1}
- 3D model (JSmol): Interactive image
- SMILES: COC1=CC=CC=C1CNCCC2=CC(=C(C=C2OC)F)OC
- InChI: InChI=1S/C18H22FNO3/c1-21-16-7-5-4-6-14(16)12-20-9-8-13-10-18(23-3)15(19)11-17(13)22-2/h4-7,10-11,20H,8-9,12H2,1-3H3; Key:DFTJMIFNIHIWAJ-UHFFFAOYSA-N

25F-NBOMe, also known as 2C-F-NBOMe or NBOMe-2C-F as well as N-(2-methoxybenzyl)-4-fluoro-2,5-dimethoxyphenethylamine, is a serotonin 5-HT_{2} receptor agonist and possible serotonergic psychedelic of the phenethylamine, 2C, and 25-NB (NBOMe) families. It is the NBOMe (N-(2-methoxybenzyl)) derivative of 2C-F.

== Pharmacology ==
=== Pharmacodynamics ===
25F-NBOMe activities
Target	Affinity (K_{i}, nM)
5-HT_{1A}	ND
5-HT_{1B}	6,331
5-HT_{1D}	5,052
5-HT_{1E}	ND
5-HT_{1F}	ND
5-HT_{2A}	3.3 (K_{i}); 16 (EC_{50}); 75% (E_{max})
5-HT_{2B}	7.5 (K_{i}); ND (EC_{50}); ND (E_{max})
5-HT_{2C}	43 (K_{i}) (rat); 25 (EC_{50}); 92% (E_{max})
5-HT_{3}	ND
5-HT_{4}	ND
5-HT_{5A}	ND
5-HT_{6}	80
5-HT_{7}	ND
α_{1A}–α_{1D}	ND
α_{2A}–α_{2C}	ND
β_{1}–β_{3}	ND
D_{1}–D_{5}	ND
H_{1}–H_{4}	ND
M_{1}–M_{5}	ND
I_{1}	ND
σ_{1}, σ_{2}	ND
ORs	ND
TAAR1	ND
SERT	ND (K_{i}); ND (IC_{50}); ND (EC_{50})
NET	ND (K_{i}); ND (IC_{50}); ND (EC_{50})
DAT	ND (K_{i}); ND (IC_{50}); ND (EC_{50})
Notes: The smaller the value, the more avidly the drug binds to the site. All proteins are human unless otherwise specified. Refs:

25F-NBOMe acts as a potent agonist of the serotonin 5-HT_{2A} and 5-HT_{2C} receptors and also shows interactions with certain other targets, such as the serotonin 5-HT_{2B} receptor. However, it shows more than an order of magnitude lower potency as a serotonin 5-HT_{2A} receptor agonist than certain other NBOMe drugs like 25I-NBOMe and 25B-NBOMe in vitro.

== History ==
25F-NBOMe was first described in the scientific literature by 2010.

== Society and culture ==
=== Legal status ===
==== Canada ====
25F-NBOMe is a controlled substance in Canada under phenethylamine blanket-ban language.

== See also ==
- 25-NB
- 2C-F
- DOF
