= MDFEM =

Clinical data
- Other names: 4-(2,2-Difluoroethoxy)-2,5-dimethoxyamphetamine; 2,5-Dimethoxy-4-(2,2-difluoroethoxy)amphetamine
- Drug class: Serotonin receptor modulator; Serotonin 5-HT_{2A} receptor agonist
- ATC code: None

Identifiers
- IUPAC name: 1-[4-(2,2-difluoroethoxy)-2,5-dimethoxyphenyl]propan-2-amine

Chemical and physical data
- Formula: C_{13}H_{19}F_{2}NO_{3}
- Molar mass: 275.296 g·mol^{−1}
- 3D model (JSmol): Interactive image
- SMILES: CC(N)CC1=CC(OC)=C(OCC(F)F)C=C1OC
- InChI: InChI=1S/C13H19F2NO3/c1-8(16)4-9-5-11(18-3)12(6-10(9)17-2)19-7-13(14)15/h5-6,8,13H,4,7,16H2,1-3H3; Key:AXKORAKXKXDBAF-UHFFFAOYSA-N

MDFEM, also known as 4-(2,2-difluoroethoxy)-2,5-dimethoxyamphetamine, is a serotonin receptor modulator of the phenethylamine, amphetamine, and DOx families. It is a derivative of the DOx psychedelics TMA-2 and MEM in which the 4-position substituent has been extended. The properties and effects of MDFEM in humans appear to be unknown. The drug is a partial agonist of the serotonin 5-HT_{2A} and 5-HT_{2B} receptors and also shows other receptor interactions. MDFEM was first described in the scientific literature by Daniel Trachsel by 2012.

== See also ==
- DOx (psychedelics)
- MEM § Derivatives
