= ZDCM-04 =

Chemical compound

Clinical data
- Other names: DOC-fenethylline; ZDCM04
- Drug class: Serotonergic psychedelic; Hallucinogen

Legal status
- Legal status: Illegal in Italy

Identifiers
- IUPAC name: 1,3-dimethyl-7-{2-[1-(2,5-dimethoxy-4-chlorophenyl)propan-2-ylamino]ethyl}purine-2,6-dione
- PubChem CID: 163192621
- CompTox Dashboard (EPA): DTXSID501336881

Chemical and physical data
- Formula: C_{20}H_{26}ClN_{5}O_{4}
- Molar mass: 435.91 g·mol^{−1}
- 3D model (JSmol): Interactive image
- SMILES: COc1cc(CC(C)NCCn2cnc3c2C(=O)N(C)C(=O)N3C)c(OC)cc1Cl
- InChI: InChI=1S/C20H26ClN5O4/c1-12(8-13-9-16(30-5)14(21)10-15(13)29-4)22-6-7-26-11-23-18-17(26)19(27)25(3)20(28)24(18)2/h9-12,22H,6-8H2,1-5H3; Key:CWRNNANKXUBLFV-UHFFFAOYSA-N

ZDCM-04, also known as DOC-fenethylline, is a recreational designer drug with psychedelic effects. It is a phenethylamine derivative which is thought to act as a prodrug of DOC and theophylline in the same way in which fenethylline acts as a prodrug for amphetamine and theophylline. ZDCM-04 was made illegal in Italy in March 2020. It has reportedly been identified from seized drug samples in Thailand.

== See also ==
- DOx (psychedelics)
- 25C-NBOMe
- Lisdexamphetamine
