= N,N,N-Trimethyl-DOB =

Clinical data
- Other names: N,N,N-Trimethyl-DOB; QDOB
- Drug class: Serotonin receptor modulator
- ATC code: None

Identifiers
- IUPAC name: 1-(4-bromo-2,5-dimethoxyphenyl)propan-2-yl-trimethylazanium
- PubChem CID: 13781102
- ChemSpider: 25044694
- ChEMBL: ChEMBL1181432

Chemical and physical data
- Formula: C_{14}H_{23}BrNO_{2}
- Molar mass: 317.247 g·mol^{−1}
- 3D model (JSmol): Interactive image
- SMILES: CC(CC1=CC(=C(C=C1OC)Br)OC)[N+](C)(C)C
- InChI: InChI=1S/C14H23BrNO2/c1-10(16(2,3)4)7-11-8-14(18-6)12(15)9-13(11)17-5/h8-10H,7H2,1-6H3/q+1; Key:VHNHSLNBQRAAPY-UHFFFAOYSA-N

4-Bromo-2,5-dimethoxy-N,N,N-trimethylamphetamine (N,N,N-trimethyl-DOB, QDOB) is a substituted amphetamine and a derivative of 2,5-dimethoxyamphetamine (a compound of the DOx series); specifically, it is an N,N,N-trimethylated quaternary ammonium derivative of the drug DOB and a very weak serotonin receptor modulator.

== Pharmacology ==
=== Pharmacodynamics ===
N,N,N-Trimethyl-DOB is a very weak serotonin receptor modulator; it binds to the 5-HT_{2A}, 5-HT_{2B} and 5-HT_{2C} receptors approximately several hundred times less strongly (K_{i} values for each are 2,155 nM, >10,000 nM and 6,298 nM respectively).

== See also ==
- DOx (psychedelics)
- N-Methyl-DOB
