= 25D-NM-NDEAOP =

Clinical data
- Other names: 25D-NM-NDECE; 25D-NM-NDEPA; N-Methyl-N-(3-diethylamino-3-oxopropyl)-2,5-dimethoxy-4-methylphenethylamine; N-Methyl-N-(3-diethylamino-3-oxopropyl)-2C-D; N-Methyl-N-(2-diethylcarbamoylethyl)-2,5-dimethoxy-4-methylphenethylamine; N-Methyl-N-(2-diethylcarbamoylethyl)-2C-D; NM-NDEAOP-2C-D; NM-NDECE-2C-D; "Compound 4"

Identifiers
- IUPAC name: 3-[2-(2,5-dimethoxy-4-methylphenyl)ethyl-methylamino]-N,N-diethylpropanamide
- CAS Number: 51867-47-1
- PubChem CID: 90678176
- ChemSpider: 34249793
- ChEMBL: ChEMBL3273532

Chemical and physical data
- Formula: C_{19}H_{32}N_{2}O_{3}
- Molar mass: 336.476 g·mol^{−1}
- 3D model (JSmol): Interactive image
- SMILES: CCN(CC)C(=O)CCN(C)CCC1=C(C=C(C(=C1)OC)C)OC
- InChI: InChI=1S/C19H32N2O3/c1-7-21(8-2)19(22)10-12-20(4)11-9-16-14-17(23-5)15(3)13-18(16)24-6/h13-14H,7-12H2,1-6H3; Key:GEVSOPBAZVTJIF-UHFFFAOYSA-N

25D-NM-NDEAOP, or 25D-NM-NDEPA, is a chemical compound of the phenethylamine and 2C families. It is a simplified or partial lysergamide and is a derivative of 2C-D with a lysergic acid diethylamide (LSD)-like N-(3-diethylamino-3-oxopropyl)- substitution.

== Pharmacology ==
=== Pharmacodynamics ===
The compound was assessed and found to inhibit prolactin secretion in rat pituitary glands in vitro at high concentrations, suggesting that it may possess weak dopamine receptor agonist activity. However, it was subsequently assessed in rats in vivo and, in contrast to LSD, was found to not significantly inhibit prolactin secretion. Other possible activities of 25D-NM-NDEAOP, such as serotonin receptor interactions and associated effects, were not evaluated or reported.

== Chemistry ==
The compound is a PEA-NDEPA derivative and is similar in structure to other PEA-NDEPA compounds such as DOM-NDEPA and TMA-2-NDEPA, as well as DOB-NDEPA, DOI-NDEPA, and DOTFM-NDEPA. The latter three compounds have been predicted via QSAR modeling to be potent serotonin 5-HT_{2A} receptor agonists. A parent compound of 25D-NM-NEAOP is N-(3-diethylamino-3-oxopropyl)-N-methylphenethylamine (N-DEAOP-NMPEA or PEA-NM-NDEPA), which showed weak oxytocic activity in preclinical research.

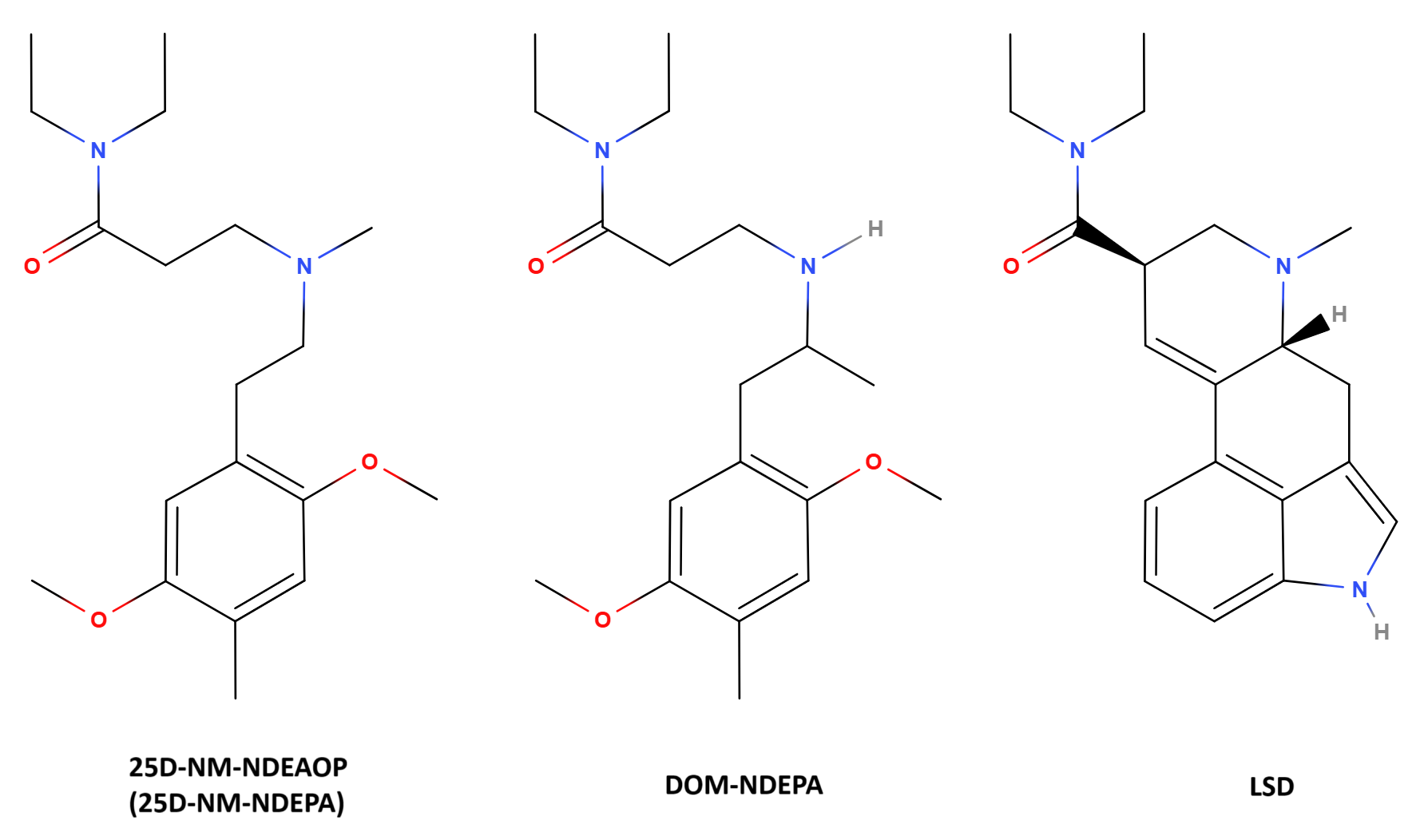
Chemical structures of 25D-NM-NDEAOP (25D-NM-NDEPA), DOM-NDEPA, and LSD. LSD contains the structures of 25D-NM-NDEAOP and DOM-NDEPA except their 2,5-dimethoxy- and 4-methyl- phenyl ring substitutions.

== History ==
25D-NDEAOP was first described in the scientific literature in 1974.

== Society and culture ==
=== Legal status ===
==== Canada ====
25D-NM-NDEAOP may or may not be a controlled substance in Canada under phenethylamine blanket-ban language.

== See also ==
- Substituted methoxyphenethylamine
- Partial lysergamide
- List of miscellaneous 5-HT_{2A} receptor agonists
- DOB-NDEPA
- DOI-NDEPA
- DOTFM-NDEPA
- 25B-NAcPip
- N-DEAOP-NMT
- UCD0179
- UCD0120
- UCD0120-2C-D
- 25-NB
- 25D-NBOMe
- DOM-NBOMe
