= DOB-NDEPA =

Clinical data
- Other names: NDEPA-DOB; "Compound ko2"
- Drug class: Possible serotonin 5-HT_{2A} receptor modulator
- ATC code: None

Identifiers
- CAS Number: 260810-30-8

Chemical and physical data
- Formula: C_{18}H_{29}BrN_{2}O_{3}
- Molar mass: 401.345 g·mol^{−1}
- 3D model (JSmol): Interactive image
- SMILES: BrC1C=C(C(=CC=1OC)CC(C)N(CCC(=O)N(CC)CC)[H])OC
- InChI: InChI=1S/C18H29BrN2O3/c1-6-21(7-2)18(22)8-9-20-13(3)10-14-11-17(24-5)15(19)12-16(14)23-4/h11-13,20H,6-10H2,1-5H3; Key:JWIWXWOKAXPSRO-UHFFFAOYSA-N

DOB-NDEPA is a chemical compound of the phenethylamine, DOx, and NDEPA families. It is the N-(N,N-diethylpropylamide) (NDEPA) derivative of the psychedelic drug DOB. The drug can also be thought of as a derivative of DOB with an LSD-like N,N-diethylamide moiety. A quantitative structure–activity relationship (QSAR) predicted that DOB-NDEPA would bind with high affinity to the serotonin 5-HT_{2A} receptor. Its predicted affinity (K_{i}) was 4.6 nM. DOB-NDEPA was first described in the scientific literature by 1999.

== See also ==
- Substituted methoxyphenethylamine
- Partial lysergamide
- DOI-NDEPA
- DOTFM-NDEPA
- 25D-NM-NDEAOP
- N-DEAOP-NMPEA
- DEMPDHPCA-2C-D
