= Conditioned place preference =

Pavlovian conditioning

Conditioned place preference (CPP) is a form of Pavlovian conditioning used to measure the motivational effects of objects or experiences. This motivation comes from the pleasurable aspect of the experience, so that the brain can be reminded of the context that surrounded the "encounter". By measuring the amount of time an animal spends in an area that has been associated with a stimulus, researchers can infer the animal's liking for the stimulus. This paradigm can also be used to measure conditioned place aversion (CPA) with an identical procedure involving aversive stimuli instead. Both procedures usually involve mice or rats as subjects. This procedure can be used to measure extinction and reinstatement of the conditioned stimulus. Certain drugs are used in this paradigm to measure their reinforcing properties. Two different methods are used to choose the compartments to be conditioned, and these are biased vs. unbiased. The biased method allows the animal to explore the apparatus, and the compartment they least prefer is the one that the drug is administered in and the one they most prefer is the one where the vehicle (without the drug) is injected. This method allows the animal to choose the compartment they get the drug and vehicle. In comparison, the unbiased method does not allow the animal to choose what compartment they get the drug and vehicle in. Instead, the researcher chooses the compartments.

Humans have also been shown to develop conditioned place preferences; for example, people taking therapeutic doses of amphetamine develop a CPP for where they consumed the drug.

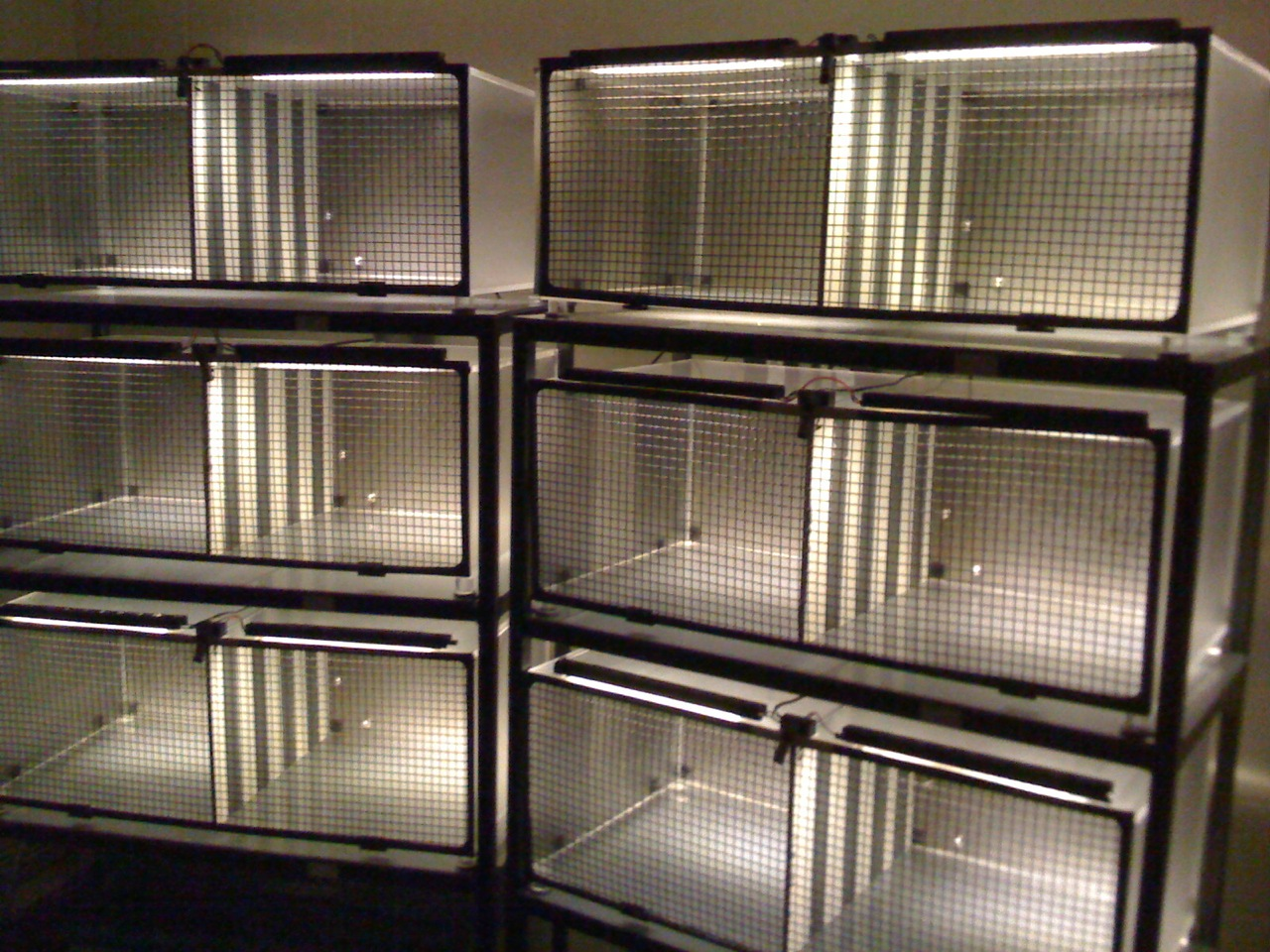
Conditioned place preference apparatus

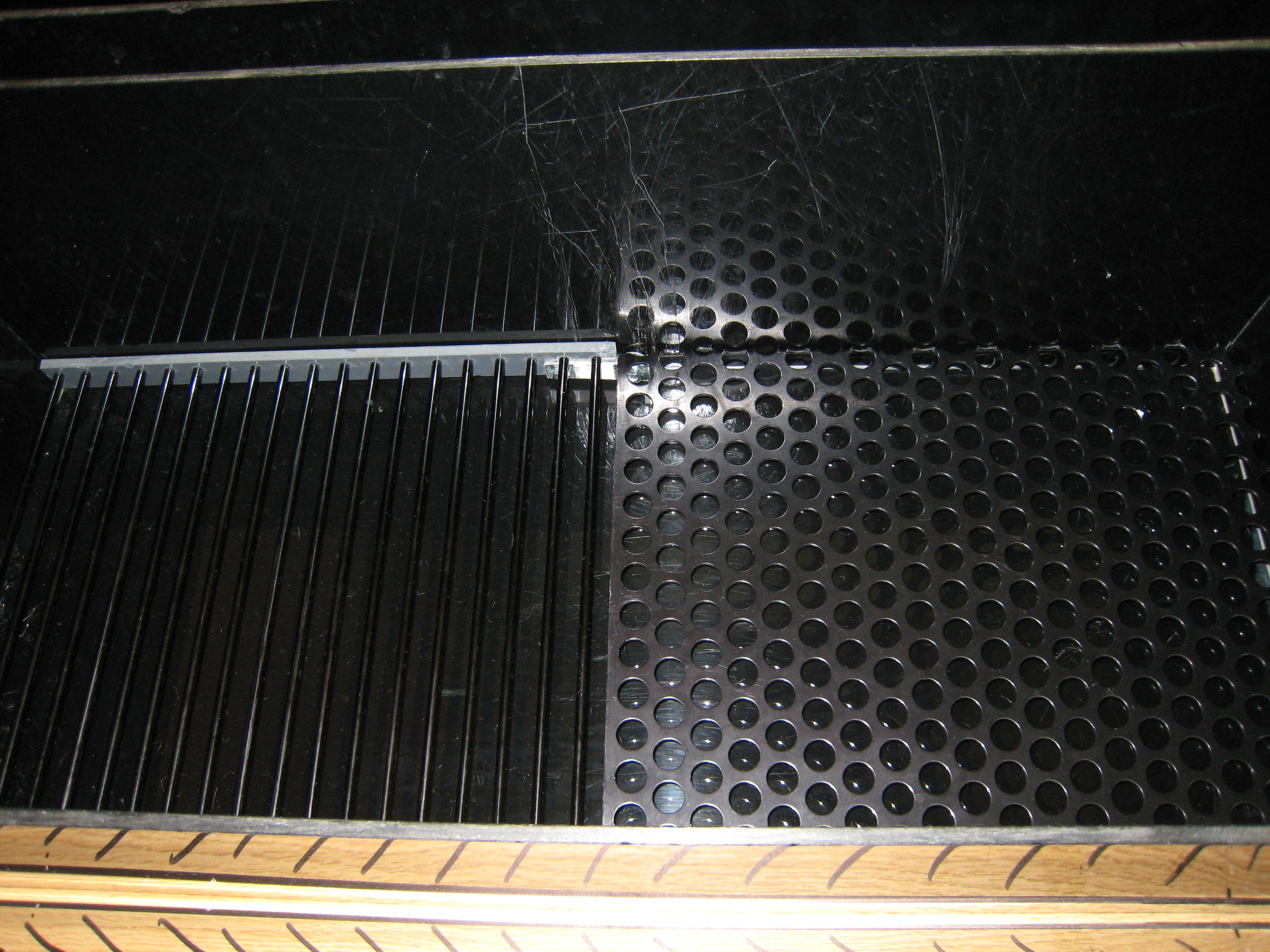
Different floor textures in conditioned place preference

The CPP effects of many drugs have been reviewed.

== Conditioning procedure ==
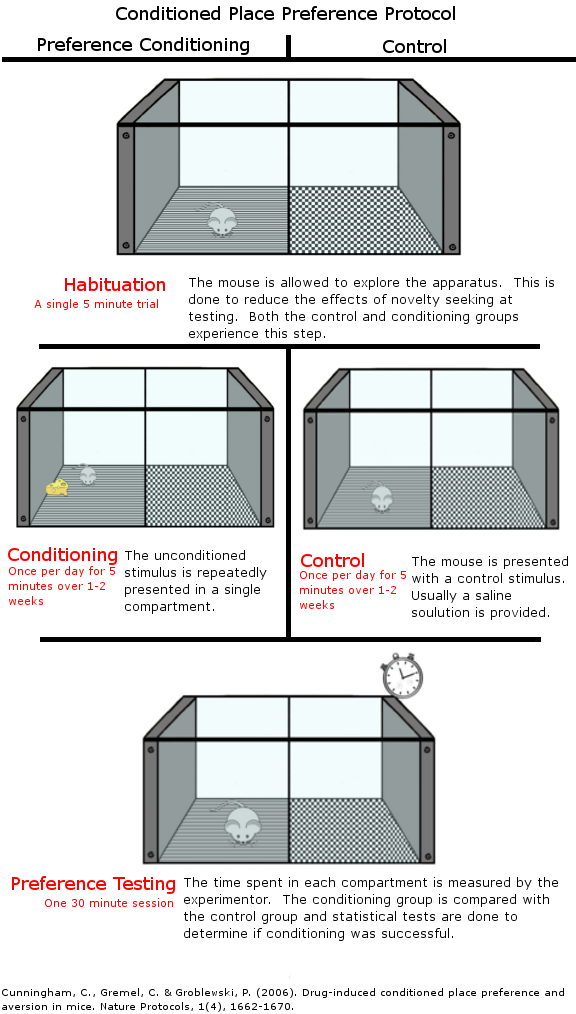
Conditioned place preference protocol

As in Pavlovian conditioning, an initial neutral stimulus, in this case, environmental cues, is repeatedly paired with an unconditioned stimulus that naturally produces a response prior to conditioning (the unconditioned response). Over time and pairings, the neutral stimulus will come to elicit responses similar to the unconditioned response. In conditioned place preference, the unconditioned stimulus could be any number of things including food pellets, water, sweet fluid, novel toys, social interaction, drug intoxication, drug withdrawal, foot shock, illness, wheel running or copulation. The initially neutral environmental cues become associated with the motivational properties of the unconditioned stimulus leading to either approach or avoidance of the environment. Often in practice, there is a control and treatment group used to strengthen the ability to make causal claims from the results. The treatment group is administered the unconditioned stimulus while the control group is given saline or nothing to control for all elements of the procedure.

=== Apparatus ===
The conditioned place preference protocol makes use of an apparatus that contains two or more compartments or areas. These two compartments are designed so that the animal can discriminate between them. Differently patterned walls or floors or different types of floor textures may be used to ensure the animal can discriminate between the compartments.

=== Steps to conditioning place preference or aversion ===
Conditioned place preference involves three phases: habituation, conditioning, and preference testing.

==== Habituation ====
In the habituation procedure, the animal is given a chance to explore the apparatus. This is done to reduce the effects of novelty and usually consists of one five-minute trial.

==== Conditioning ====
In the conditioning phase, the unconditioned stimulus (e.g. morphine) is administered to the animal (usually a mouse or rat) in the treatment group. In this phase of the procedure the animal is only allowed access to one compartment of the apparatus. This compartment will become associated with the motivational effects of the unconditioned stimulus. The environment will come to elicit an approach or avoidance-withdrawal depending on the nature of the unconditioned stimulus. The conditioning procedure usually consists of eight or more five-minute sessions.

==== Preference testing ====
In the preference testing phase, the animal is allowed unrestricted access to all compartments of the apparatus. During the test, the time a subject spends in each compartment is measured in seconds. Modern protocols utilize commercial automated tracking systems to measure the time; however, manual measurement is also used. Statistical testing is used to determine whether a significant difference in time is present when compared to either a control group or the pre-conditioning time of the same group (baseline value). Strength of conditioning is inferred by the magnitude of the difference or in the amount of time taken for the response to show extinction.

=== Outcomes ===
In the standard conditioned place preference procedure, when the unconditioned stimulus is rewarding, rodents will be more likely to approach the compartment that contains cues associated with it. Alternatively, when the unconditioned stimulus is aversive, rodents will be more likely to escape and avoid the compartment that contains cues associated with it. The timing of presentation of the unconditioned stimulus can determine whether place preference or aversion will be conditioned. For example, in trials testing drugs of abuse, if the animal experiences the initial pleasurable effects of the drug while in the conditioning context, the result will likely be conditioned place preference. However, if the animal is given the drug and then the experimenter implements a sufficient delay so that the animal is experiencing the negative aftereffects of the drug, conditioned place aversion is more likely to occur. The timing of these events can be manipulated by the experimenter in order to condition place preference or avoidance.

== Advantages and disadvantages ==
=== Advantages ===
There are numerous advantages of the conditioned place preference and aversion protocol. It is methodologically simple and only requires two to three weeks to perform all steps of the procedure. In some cases, conditioning can occur with two stimulus-context pairings. It allows both rewarding and aversive effects to be tested and it provides unique information about the motivational effects of unconditioned stimuli. Although the protocol is most often used with mice and rats, it can be adapted for use in other species such as birds and other rodents.

In drug testing the conditioned reward or aversive effects can be tested in a drug-free state where the animals will not be impaired due to drug use. The testing is also sensitive to the effects of low drug doses. Conditioned place preference is well suited to measure the temporal profile of drugs (the pattern of rewarding and aversive effects) as well as the aversive effects of withdrawal. This can be done by varying the time of drug administration in relation to the presentation of the to-be-conditioned context. The procedure also can be utilized to measure the neural circuits involved in drug reward.

=== Disadvantages ===
The conditioned place preference and aversion protocol are subject to several disadvantages and limitations. Perhaps the most significant disadvantage is that despite experimenters' best attempts to habituate animals to the procedure before conditioning, novelty-seeking effects can skew the data. Also, without a clear control of several variables that may interfere with the outcomes, such as the animal's strain, age, weight and housing, results from different studies may be difficult to compare, as the different outcomes may seem to contradict each other.

Another limitation of the procedure is the distinction between a biased and an unbiased CPP apparatus. Some authors indicate the importance of declaring in the publication, which type of CPP box has been used. Thus a pretest is needed to define a possibly existing preference for one compartment. In a biased context, it is to show an absolute CPP to the initially non-preferred place. Otherwise, for instance, when anxiolytic drugs are used as the rewarding agent, we can interpret only relative place preference to be derived from the anxiolytic effect of the drug. On the other hand, with a biased design, we can distinguish between the anxiolytic and anti-aversive effects of drugs independently from potential genuine rewarding effects.

In addition, individuals who will be handling animals must be trained to do this consistently so as to minimize stress on the animal. It has been shown that stressful handling in rodents can weaken conditioning.

There is debate over whether or not the results obtained from drug studies can be generalized to drug reward in humans. It has been claimed that since the animal passively receives the drug, it cannot be compared.

== Extinction and reinstatement procedures ==
=== Extinction ===
Extinction in the conditioned place preference paradigm is the process by which the association of the place compartment with the paired aversives or appetitive stimulus is greatly reduced, thus diminishing the place preference or aversion. Extinction occurs when the conditioned stimulus is presented on repeated trials without the presence of the appetitive or aversive stimulus. For example, if the animal had been given a reinforcing food stimulus when in one place compartment and established a preference for this place, the extinction process would be implemented by placing the animal in the compartment but not giving it the reinforcing food stimulus (unconditioned stimulus) while it was in the compartment. The extinction process can be used with knockout mice to establish whether certain receptors are particularly involved in the extinction process. Extinction is also used by researchers to study different forms of reinstatement.

=== Reinstatement ===
Reinstatement is a method used in animal testing procedures including CPP and self-administration. It is often used to model the behavior of drug relapse in humans, although its validity is a topic of debate. Reinstatement is the rapid reacquisition of an extinct behavior, which is caused by either the presentation of the unconditioned stimulus, by stress, or by context cues. This shows that the process of extinction does not eliminate an association, since the association between the UCS and the CS can be rapidly reacquired. In the context of conditioned place preference, after a place preference has been extinguished, the behavior is said to be reinstated when the animal quickly reacquires their place preference after repeated extinction trials have caused the preference to be extinguished. This has implications for research on drug relapse. There are two main modes of action for which reinstatement is often tested in the conditioned place preference paradigm. One is by introducing the animal (generally rats or mice are used) to stress. The other is by giving them a small dose of the unconditioned stimulus. In the case of CPP, when drugs are used to establish conditioned place preference, this is called drug priming.

==== Primed induced reinstatement ====
Primed-induced Reinstatement is a test in CPP whereby the unconditioned stimulus is given to the animal after the association between the UCS and CS has been extinguished. The administration of the UCS primes the association with the CS (place compartment) and stimulates the reacquisition of the place preference. Drugs of abuse such as cocaine and heroin have a particularly strong ability to be reinstated through priming, which is known as drug-primed reinstatement. Drug-primed reinstatement is thought to renew the incentive value of the place compartment because of the motivational effects of the drug. Drug-primed reinstatement has been tested in CPP primarily with psychostimulants and opiates. Reinstatement with drug primes depends on the dose of the drug that is given to the animal. Small administrations of the drug-prime will generally not produce reinstatement whereas higher doses will. One area of the brain that is linked to reinstatement of place preference through drug priming is the lateral habenula Drug-primed reinstatement of cocaine has shown to also be reinstated by administration of similar psychostimulants including methamphetamine and methylphenidate All three of these psychostimulants increase the amount of dopamine in the nucleus accumbens by blocking reuptake of dopamine, which is presumed to mediate the drug's rewarding effects. This is also the case with morphine. Administration of morphine, heroin, and cocaine induce reinstatement or morphine-induced CPP.

==== Stress induced reinstatement ====
In the conditioned place preference paradigm, stress has been shown to reinstate conditioned place preferences in rats after the preference had been extinguished. This has implications for research on addiction because of the effect that stress has on human relapse behavior. Stress-induced reinstatement in CPP occurs when the animal is exposed to stress after a place preference has been extinguished. This exposure leads to reinstatement of the place preference. Common stressors used in these paradigms include foot shock and noise Some studies have shown that when drugs of abuse are used as appetitive stimuli, exposure to stress can reinstate place preference that has been extinguished over two weeks.

When rats experience stress in the form of foot shock or noise, changes occur in the norepinephrine system and the hypothalamic-pituitary-adrenal axis. These changes have a high impact on the reinstatement of conditioned place preference. Stress stimulates the release of corticotropin-releasing hormone (CRH) from the rat's hypothalamus which leads to a series of changes through the pituitary gland in the brain to release glucocorticoids from the adrenal glands. CRH also stimulates the release of neurotransmitters in the hypothalamic regions of the brain to mediate stress-induced changes in brain activity This system plays a key role in the reinstatement of conditioned place preference. CRH acts as a neurotransmitter in regions of the brain including the bed nucleus of the stria terminalis and the amygdala. Reinstatement of conditioned place preference has shown to be blocked when antagonists for CRH receptors are injected into the BNST. In other words, the effects of stress on reinstatement can be inhibited by blocking the receptor sites for CRH in certain areas of the brain. The neurotransmitter noradrenaline also plays a role in stress-induced reinstatement. Blockage of certain noradrenergic receptors inhibits stress-induced reinstatement. Furthermore, disinhibition of areas of the brain that inhibit the release of noradrenaline also nullifies the effect of stress-induced reinstatement. Together, the noradrenaline and CRH systems play a key role in the stress-induced reinstatement of conditioned place preference and provide knowledge of the neurochemical basis of stress-induced relapse.

=== Relapse ===
Research on stress and drug-primed reinstatement has implications for the treatment of addiction research in humans. Reinstatement studies on stress and drug primes provide evidence for their role in relapse behavior in humans. In addition to conditioned placed preference, animal testing using self-administration procedures has also been used to examine potential causes of relapse in humans. Stress and drug primes have also been shown to contribute to relapse behavior in humans. With the knowledge that stress and drug primes contribute to relapse behavior, measures to avoid stressful situations can help addicts avoid returning to their addictive behaviors. Drug priming is thought to induce relapse in humans because of its effects on the reward circuits of the brain. Repeated drug exposure is thought to sensitize the rewarding effect of the drug, and exposure to the drug after extinction can reintroduce this rewarding effect. These effects play a key role in the persistence of drug-seeking behaviors. Researchers use the reinstatement procedure to test the ability of certain drugs to inhibit these different types of reinstatement. One such drug that has been shown to have attenuating effects on reinstatement is mecamylamine. This is a selective nicotinic acetylcholine receptor antagonist which, if administered after extinction trials, can block the reinstatement of the conditioned place preference for nicotine and opiates. Although direct causal linkages cannot be assumed between reinstatement in the conditioned place preference procedure and relapse in humans, it provides a solid first step in the process of creating drugs that may one day be used to treat relapse in humans.

== Knockout mice ==
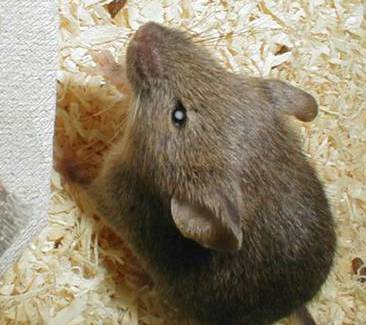
Knockout mice are used to demonstrate behavioural or physiological differences

Knockout mice are genetically modified mice that have had certain genes selectively removed. The removal of certain genes allows researchers to study the effects of certain genes missing and the implications of missing genes on physiology and behavior.

=== Cocaine ===
Genetic knockouts of the dopamine transporter failed to eliminate the conditioned place preference of cocaine, implying there may be different mechanisms of cocaine's reinforcing properties. Mice lacking the noradrenaline transporter and serotonin transporter separately or at the same time demonstrated an enhanced conditioned place preference. No conditioned place preference was found in knockout mice lacking serotonin receptor 5-HT_{1B}.

=== Nicotine ===
Genetic knockouts of nicotinic receptor subunit β_{2} in mice resulted in a lack of conditioned place preference. This further compiling information on the importance of the nAChR subunit β_{2} in nicotine's reinforcing properties. Studies also show a lack of conditioned place preference in CB_{1} receptor knockout mice, implicating a possible contribution of the endocannabinoid system.

=== Ethanol ===
Genetic knockouts of the dopamine D_{2} receptor, vesicular monoamine transport 2 (VMAT2), μ-opioid receptor, and CB_{1} cannabinoid receptor all exhibit a lack of ethanol-associated conditioned place preference, consistent with a widespread action of ethanol on the brain through many different mechanisms.

== See also ==
- Classical conditioning
- Neuropharmacology
- Operant conditioning
- Paradigm
- Psychopharmacology
- Reinforcement
- Self-administration
