= UCD0120-2C-D =

Clinical data
- Other names: DEMPDHPCA-2C-D; "Compound 45"
- Drug class: Possible serotonergic psychedelic or hallucinogen
- ATC code: None

Identifiers
- IUPAC name: N,N-diethyl-1-methyl-5-(2,5-dimethoxy-4-methylphenyl)-3,6-dihydro-2H-pyridine-3-carboxamide

Chemical and physical data
- Formula: C_{20}H_{30}N_{2}O_{3}
- Molar mass: 346.471 g·mol^{−1}
- 3D model (JSmol): Interactive image
- SMILES: CCN(CC)C(C1C=C(C2=CC(OC)=C(C)C=C2OC)CN(C)C1)=O
- InChI: InChI=1S/C20H30N2O3/c1-7-22(8-2)20(23)16-10-15(12-21(4)13-16)17-11-18(24-5)14(3)9-19(17)25-6/h9-11,16H,7-8,12-13H2,1-6H3; Key:ZANDNBLJKNVGIE-UHFFFAOYSA-N

UCD0120-2C-D is a possible serotonergic psychedelic of the phenethylamine and 2C families. It is a cyclized phenethylamine and a partial or simplified lysergamide. More specifically, the compound is a derivative of 2C-D in which the β position has been cyclized with the amine to form a tetrahydropyridine ring that is substituted such that it is identical to the D ring of LSD. Alternatively, it may be viewed as an analogue of LSD in which the B and C rings have been removed and 4-methyl and 2,5-dimethoxy substitutions have been added to the phenyl ring (i.e., the A ring of LSD).

The synthesis of UCD0120-2C-D was attempted by David E. Nichols in his PhD thesis in 1973, though it was not successful. However, several close analogues of UCD0120-2C-D, such as UCD0120 and a few of its derivatives, have been reported to be potent serotonin 5-HT_{2A} receptor agonists or to produce hallucinogen-like behavioral effects in animals. In addition, the established putative psychedelic LPH-5 ((S)-2C-TFM-3PIP) is similar to UCD0120-2C-D in chemical structure but most notably lacks the LSD-like N,N-diethylamide and olefin moieties.

Chemical structures of UCD0120-2C-D and related compounds
2C-D

UCD0120

UCD0120-2C-D

LPH-5

LSD

== See also ==
- Partial lysergamide
- List of miscellaneous 5-HT_{2A} receptor agonists
- UCD0120 § Derivatives
- 25D-NM-NDEAOP
- 25B-NAcPip
