= DOTFM =

Psychedelic drug

Clinical data
- Other names: 2,5-Dimethoxy-4-trifluoromethylamphetamine; 4-Trifluoromethyl-2,5-dimethoxyamphetamine; DOTFM; 3C-TFM
- Routes of administration: Oral

Legal status
- Legal status: CA: Schedule I; UK: Class A

Pharmacokinetic data
- Duration of action: Unknown

Identifiers
- IUPAC name: (RS)-1-[2,5-Dimethoxy-4-(trifluoromethyl)phenyl]propan-2-amine
- CAS Number: 159277-07-3 159277-12-0 (hydrochloride)
- PubChem CID: 10400521
- ChemSpider: 8575959
- UNII: NLH3FWZ9T4
- ChEMBL: ChEMBL6620
- CompTox Dashboard (EPA): DTXSID40439330

Chemical and physical data
- Formula: C_{12}H_{16}F_{3}NO_{2}
- Molar mass: 263.260 g·mol^{−1}
- 3D model (JSmol): Interactive image
- SMILES: FC(F)(F)c1cc(OC)c(cc1OC)CC(N)C
- InChI: InChI=1S/C12H16F3NO2/c1-7(16)4-8-5-11(18-3)9(12(13,14)15)6-10(8)17-2/h5-7H,4,16H2,1-3H3; Key:WPGOTSORDNBMHP-UHFFFAOYSA-N

DOTFM, also known as 2,5-dimethoxy-4-trifluoromethylamphetamine, is a psychedelic drug of the phenethylamine, amphetamine, and DOx families related to DOM. It is the α-methylated analogue of 2C-TFM. The drug is the most potent known DOx psychedelic.

== Use and effects ==
According to Daniel Trachsel, DOTFM is active as a psychedelic in humans at doses of 0.3 to 1 mg (300–1,000 μg) orally and its duration is not listed. It is the most potent psychedelic of the DOx family, followed by DOB, which has a dose range of 1 to 3 mg orally.

== Pharmacology ==
=== Pharmacodynamics ===
DOTFM acts as an agonist at the serotonin 5-HT_{2A} and 5-HT_{2C} receptors. In drug discrimination tests in rats, DOTFM fully substituted for LSD and was slightly more potent than DOI. In addition, (R)-DOTFM robustly induces the head-twitch response, a behavioral proxy of psychedelic effects, in rodents, with equivalent potency as (R)-DOI. The drug is around twice as potent as 2C-TFM in animal studies.

In contrast to (R)-DOI, which has extraordinarily potent serotonin 5-HT_{2A} receptor-mediated anti-inflammatory effects, DOTFM shows no anti-inflammatory effects. The differences between the drugs in this regard appear to be due to differences in functional selectivity at the serotonin 5-HT_{2A} receptor.

== Chemistry ==
=== Synthesis ===
The chemical synthesis of DOTFM has been described.

=== Analogues ===
Analogues of DOTFM include 2C-TFM, 4C-TFM (TFM-Ariadne; 4C-DOTFM), DOTFE, TFMFly (DOTFM-FLY), and 25TFM-NBOMe, among others.

== History ==
DOTFM was first synthesized in 1994 by a team at Purdue University led by David E. Nichols. The threshold dose in humans was reported by Alexander Shulgin in his 2011 book The Shulgin Index, Volume One: Psychedelic Phenethylamines and Related Compounds, who cited personal communication with an anonymous individual in 2003 as the source for the information. Subsequently, Daniel Trachsel described a wider dose range in 2013, although did not report its duration.

== Society and culture ==
=== Legal status ===
==== Canada ====
DOTFM is a controlled substance in Canada under phenethylamine blanket-ban language.

== See also ==
- DOx (psychedelics)
- 2C-iBu (ELE-02)
- 5-HT_{2A} receptor § Anti-inflammatory effects
