= 2,4,5-Trimethoxyamphetamine =

TMA-2

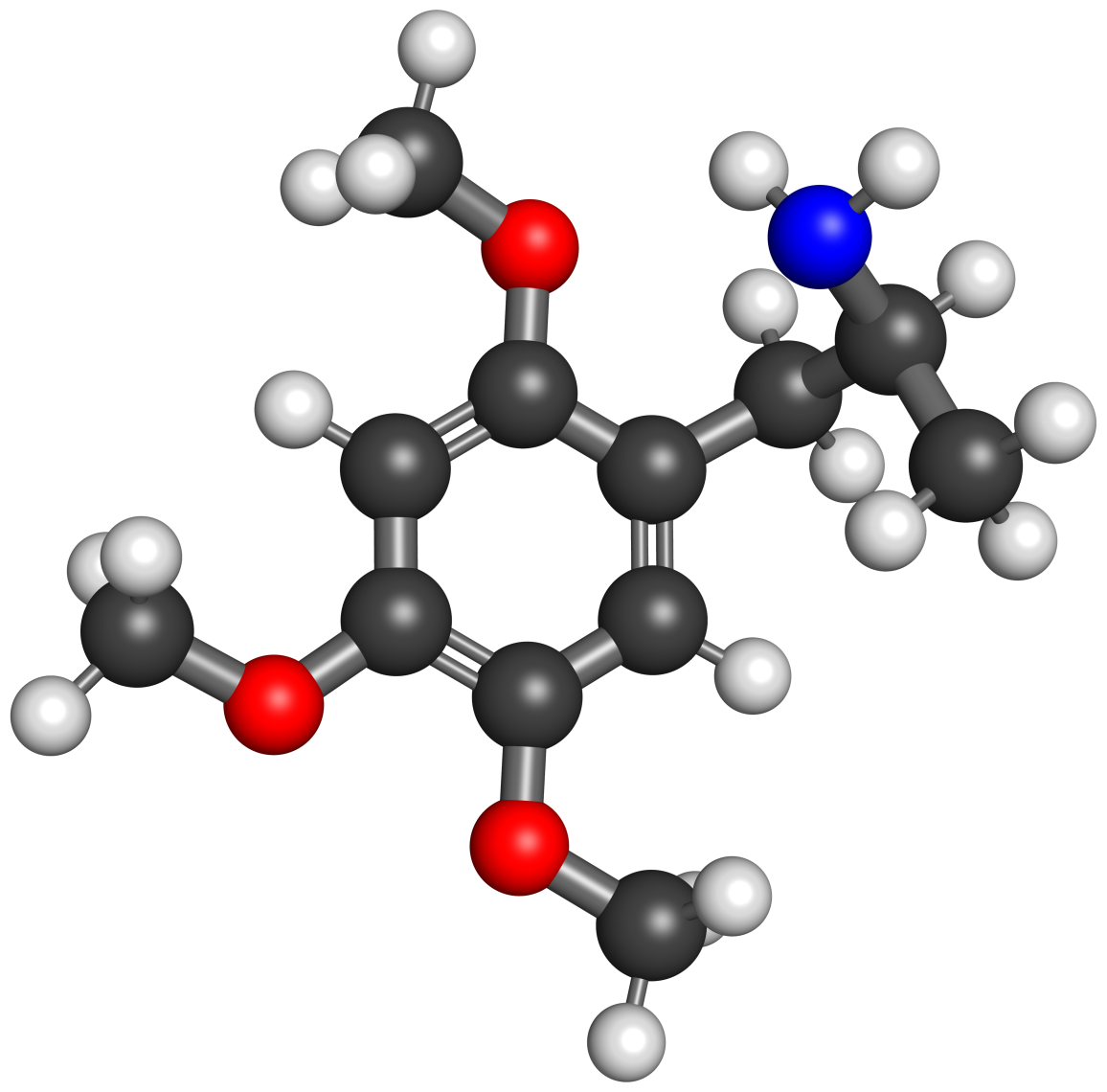

Clinical data
- Other names: TMA-2; 2,4,5-TMA; 2,4,5-Trimethoxy-α-methylphenethylamine; 2,5-Dimethoxy-4-methoxyamphetamine; 4-Methoxy-2,5-dimethoxyamphetamine; DOMeO; DOOMe; DOO; MMM; β-Aminodihydroasarone
- Routes of administration: Oral
- Drug class: Serotonergic psychedelic; Hallucinogen
- ATC code: None

Legal status
- Legal status: US: Schedule I

Pharmacokinetic data
- Onset of action: ≥1 hour
- Duration of action: 8–12 hours

Identifiers
- IUPAC name: 1-(2,4,5-trimethoxyphenyl)propan-2-amine
- CAS Number: 1083-09-6
- PubChem CID: 31014
- ChemSpider: 28773
- UNII: 713Z3SL0TJ
- KEGG: C22746
- ChEMBL: ChEMBL8389
- CompTox Dashboard (EPA): DTXSID00874364

Chemical and physical data
- Formula: C_{12}H_{19}NO_{3}
- Molar mass: 225.288 g·mol^{−1}
- 3D model (JSmol): Interactive image
- SMILES: CC(CC1=CC(=C(C=C1OC)OC)OC)N
- InChI: InChI=1S/C12H19NO3/c1-8(13)5-9-6-11(15-3)12(16-4)7-10(9)14-2/h6-8H,5,13H2,1-4H3; Key:TVSIMAWGATVNGK-UHFFFAOYSA-N

2,4,5-Trimethoxyamphetamine (2,4,5-TMA), also known as TMA-2, MMM, or 2,5-dimethoxy-4-methoxyamphetamine (DOMeO), is a psychedelic drug of the phenethylamine and amphetamine families. It is one of the trimethoxyamphetamine (TMA) series of positional isomers. The drug is also notable in being the 4-methoxylated member of the DOx (i.e., 4-substituted-2,5-dimethoxyamphetamine) series of drugs.

== Use and effects ==
In his book PiHKAL (Phenethylamines I Have Known and Loved), Alexander Shulgin lists TMA-2's dose as 20 to 40 mg orally and its duration as 8 to 12 hours. In earlier publications, it was described that threshold effects occur at a dose of 10 mg orally, an effective dose is 16 to 20 mg orally, its onset of psychoactive effects is after 1 hour, and a plateau of effects occurs from 3 to 6 hours following administration. The drug is much more potent than its positional isomer 3,4,5-trimethoxyamphetamine (3,4,5-TMA, TMA, or TMA-1), which is said to be active at doses of 100 to 250 mg orally and to have a duration of 6 to 8 hours. However, DOM (2,5-dimethoxy-4-methylamphetamine), the analogue of TMA-2 in which its 4-methoxy group has been replaced with a more lipophilic 4-methyl group, is about 10 times more potent than TMA-2. TMA-2 has been said to have a sharp dose–response curve, with several additional toxic symptoms occurring at doses of 25 to 30 mg.

The effects of TMA-2 have been reported to include color and contrast enhancement, closed-eye imagery like kaleidoscopic images, visuals such as visual distortion and movement, auditory enhancement, increased salience of objects in one's environment, cosmic thinking, time dilation, and music and erotic enhancement. Other effects have been reported to include confusion, lethargy, laziness, sleepiness, lightheadedness, feeling faintish and actual fainting, brief but repeated periods of amnesia, fear of psychosis, pupil dilation, paresthesia, nausea, vomiting, abdominal cramps, diarrhea, and muscle tremors, among others. The drug was described as a "seminal" or "archetypal" psychedelic in PiHKAL.

== Interactions ==
Combination of TMA-2 with harmaline or ibogaine has been reported to result in long-lasting episodes complicated by severe psychomotor agitation.

== Pharmacology ==
=== Pharmacodynamics ===
TMA-2 activities
Target	Affinity (K_{i}, nM)
5-HT_{1A}	>10,000
5-HT_{1B}	>10,000
5-HT_{1D}	>10,000
5-HT_{1E}	>10,000
5-HT_{1F}	ND
5-HT_{2A}	57.9–1,300 (K_{i}); 190–1,860 (EC_{50}); 84–102% (E_{max})
5-HT_{2B}	154–307 (K_{i}); 270 (EC_{50}); 78% (E_{max})
5-HT_{2C}	87.7–5,300
5-HT_{3}	>10,000
5-HT_{4}	ND
5-HT_{5A}	>10,000
5-HT_{6}	>10,000
5-HT_{7}	>10,000
α_{1A}, α_{1B}	>10,000
α_{1D}	ND
α_{2A}–α_{2C}	>10,000
β_{1}, β_{2}	>10,000
D_{1}–D_{5}	>10,000
H_{1}	1,407
H_{2}–H_{4}	>10,000
M_{1}, M_{3}, M_{4}	ND
M_{2}, M_{5}	>10,000
TAAR_{1}	>4,400 (K_{i}) (mouse); 3,100 (K_{i}) (rat); ND (EC_{50}) (human)
I_{1}	ND
σ_{1}, σ_{2}	ND
SERT	>10,000 (K_{i}) >100,000 (IC_{50}) >100,000 (EC_{50}) (rat)
NET	>10,000 (K_{i}) >100,000 (IC_{50}) >100,000 (EC_{50}) (rat)
DAT	>10,000 (K_{i}) >100,000 (IC_{50}) >100,000 (EC_{50}) (rat)
MAO-A	>100,000 (IC_{50}) (rat)
MAO-B	>100,000 (IC_{50}) (rat)
Notes: The smaller the value, the more avidly the drug binds to the site. All proteins are human unless otherwise specified. Refs:

TMA-2's affinity (K_{i}) for the serotonin 5-HT_{2A} receptor has been found to be 1,300 nM. Its EC_{50} at the receptor was 190 nM and its E_{max} was 84%. The drug was also active at the serotonin 5-HT_{2B} receptor and, to a much lesser extent, at the serotonin 5-HT_{2C} receptor. In an earlier study, its affinities (K_{i}) were 1,650 nM at the serotonin 5-HT_{2} receptor and 46,400 nM at the serotonin 5-HT_{1} receptor. TMA-2 is inactive at the monoamine transporters. It was inactive at the mouse trace amine-associated receptor 1 (TAAR1), whereas it bound to the rat TAAR1 with an affinity (K_{i}) of 3,100 nM and was not assessed at the human TAAR1.

=== Pharmacokinetics ===
In terms of metabolism, TMA-2 is known to be at least partially O-demethylated in animals in vivo. It might produce 2,4,5-trihydroxyamphetamine (THA) as a metabolite. The pharmacokinetics and metabolism of TMA-2 in humans are unknown.

== Chemistry ==
=== Properties ===
The chemical properties of TMA-2 have been described.

=== Synthesis ===
The chemical synthesis of TMA-2 has been described.

=== Analogues and derivatives ===
TMA-2 (2,4,5-trimethoxyamphetamine) is very similar in chemical structure to the monoaminergic neurotoxin 6-hydroxydopamine (2,4,5-trihydroxyphenethylamine).

A variety of derivatives of TMA-2 (MMM) have been developed and studied, such as MEM among others.

== History ==
TMA-2 was first described in the scientific literature by Viktor Bruckner in 1933. Subsequently, Alexander Shulgin discovered the hallucinogenic effects of TMA-2 in 1962 and published them in 1964. The drug was later described in further detail by Shulgin in his 1991 book PiHKAL (Phenethylamines I Have Known and Loved).

== Society and culture ==
=== Legal status ===
==== Canada ====
TMA-2 is a controlled substance in Canada.

==== United States ====
TMA-2 is not an explicitly controlled substance in the United States. However, it is a positional isomer of 3,4,5-trimethoxyamphetamine (TMA), and thus may be considered a Schedule I controlled substance in this country similarly to TMA.

== See also ==
- Trimethoxyamphetamine
- Substituted methoxyphenethylamine
- 2,4,5-Trimethoxyphenethylamine (2,4,5-TMPEA; 2C-O)
- 2,5-Dimethoxyamphetamine (2,5-DMA; DMA-4; DOH)
- 2,4-Dimethoxyamphetamine (2,4-DMA; DMA-3)
