= 5-HT2 receptor =

Transmembrane protein

The 5-HT_{2} receptors are a subfamily of 5-HT receptors that bind the endogenous neurotransmitter serotonin (5-hydroxytryptamine, 5-HT). The 5-HT_{2} subfamily consists of three G protein-coupled receptors (GPCRs) which are coupled to G_{q}/G_{11} and mediate excitatory neurotransmission, including 5-HT_{2A}, 5-HT_{2B}, and 5-HT_{2C}. For more information, please see the respective main articles of the individual subtypes:

- 5-HT_{2A} receptor
- 5-HT_{2B} receptor
- 5-HT_{2C} receptor

== See also ==
- 5-HT_{1} receptor
- 5-HT_{3} receptor
- 5-HT_{4} receptor
- 5-HT_{5} receptor
- 5-HT_{6} receptor
- 5-HT_{7} receptor
- Category:5-HT_{2} antagonists
