= C13H21NO3 =

The molecular formula C_{13}H_{21}NO_{3} (molar mass : 239.31 g/mol, exact mass : 239.152144) may refer to:

- α-Ethylmescaline
- Asymbescaline
- 2C-O-4
- BOED
- 3C-E
- 2,5-Dimethoxy-4-ethoxyamphetamine
- 2,6-Dimethylmescaline
- EMM (psychedelic)
- Isoetarine
- Isoproscaline
- Levomoprolol
- Levosalbutamol
- Metaproscaline
- MME (psychedelic)
- Moprolol
- Proscaline
- Salbutamol
- Symbescaline
- Trichocereine
- Methyl-TMA
- Methyl-TMA-2
