= Buscaline =

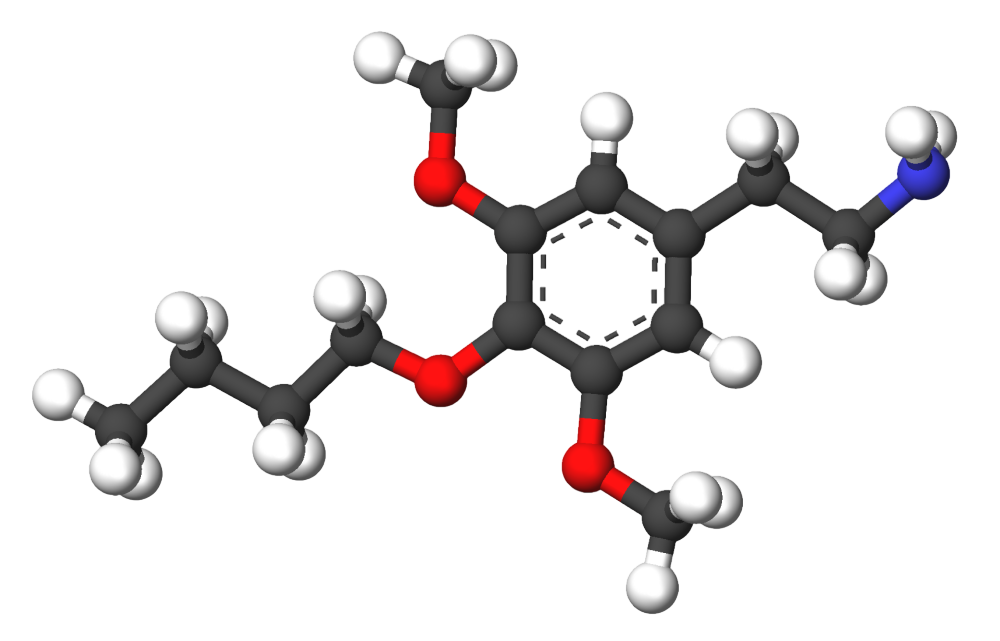

Clinical data
- Other names: B; 3,5-Dimethoxy-4-butoxyphenethylamine; 4-Butoxy-3,5-dimethoxyphenethylamine
- Routes of administration: Oral
- Drug class: Psychoactive drug
- ATC code: None

Pharmacokinetic data
- Duration of action: "Several hours"

Identifiers
- IUPAC name: 2-(3,5-dimethoxy-4-butoxyphenyl)ethan-1-amine
- CAS Number: 64778-75-2
- PubChem CID: 15102780
- ChemSpider: 10440102
- UNII: 4W9CQK6FS8
- ChEMBL: ChEMBL159467
- CompTox Dashboard (EPA): DTXSID80568214

Chemical and physical data
- Formula: C_{14}H_{23}NO_{3}
- Molar mass: 253.342 g·mol^{−1}
- 3D model (JSmol): Interactive image
- SMILES: COc1cc(cc(OC)c1OCCCC)CCN
- InChI: InChI=1S/C14H23NO3/c1-4-5-8-18-14-12(16-2)9-11(6-7-15)10-13(14)17-3/h9-10H,4-8,15H2,1-3H3; Key:CHHALFOHMQNBAW-UHFFFAOYSA-N

Buscaline (B), also known as 4-butoxy-3,5-dimethoxyphenethylamine, is a psychoactive drug of the phenethylamine and scaline families related to mescaline. It is the derivative of mescaline in which the methoxy group at the 4 position has been replaced with a butoxy group.

In his book PiHKAL (Phenethylamines I Have Known and Loved) and other publications, Alexander Shulgin lists buscaline's dose as greater than 150 mg orally and its duration as "several hours". The effects of buscaline have been reported to include a slight change from baseline, no noticeable visual or auditory effects, uninteresting mental effects, body load, more bodily effects than mental effects, brief heart arrhythmia, stomach discomfort, light diarrhea, cold feet, and slight uncomfortableness. No clear hallucinogenic effects were described.

The chemical synthesis of buscaline has been described. Analogues of buscaline include mescaline, escaline, proscaline, isoproscaline, isobuscaline, and thiobuscaline, among others. Shulgin concluded based on investigation of buscaline that there would not be value in exploration of higher homologues of mescaline extended at the 4 position.

Buscaline was first described in the scientific literature in 1930. Subsequently, it was described in greater detail by Shulgin in PiHKAL in 1991.

== See also ==
- Scaline
