= Metaescaline =

Clinical data
- Other names: ME; 3-Ethoxy-4,5-dimethoxyphenethylamine; 3,4-Dimethoxy-5-ethoxyphenethylamine
- Routes of administration: Oral
- Drug class: Serotonergic psychedelic; Hallucinogen
- ATC code: None

Pharmacokinetic data
- Onset of action: 0.5–1.5 hours
- Duration of action: 8–12 hours

Identifiers
- IUPAC name: 2-(3-ethoxy-4,5-dimethoxyphenyl)ethan-1-amine
- CAS Number: 90132-31-3
- PubChem CID: 44350068
- ChemSpider: 21106344
- UNII: M4HNS35MM2
- ChEMBL: ChEMBL126963
- CompTox Dashboard (EPA): DTXSID30658376

Chemical and physical data
- Formula: C_{12}H_{19}NO_{3}
- Molar mass: 225.288 g·mol^{−1}
- 3D model (JSmol): Interactive image
- SMILES: COc1c(cc(cc1OCC)CCN)OC
- InChI: InChI=1S/C12H19NO3/c1-4-16-11-8-9(5-6-13)7-10(14-2)12(11)15-3/h7-8H,4-6,13H2,1-3H3; Key:HNBAVLIQFTYMAX-UHFFFAOYSA-N

Metaescaline (ME), also known as 3-ethoxy-4,5-dimethoxyphenethylamine, is a psychedelic drug of the phenethylamine and scaline families related to mescaline. It is the analogue of mescaline in which the methoxy group at the 3 position has been replaced with an ethoxy group. The drug is also the positional isomer of escaline in which the methoxy group at the 3 (meta) position and the ethoxy group at the 4 position have been interchanged.

== Use and effects ==
In his book PiHKAL (Phenethylamines I Have Known and Loved), Alexander Shulgin lists metaescaline's dose as 200 to 350 mg orally and its duration as 8 to 12 hours. Its onset was described as slow and ranged from 0.5 to 1.5 hours. The drug's potency is similar to that of mescaline.

The effects of metaescaline were reported to include brightening of colors, mildly heightened visual awareness and quite heightened auditory awareness, no closed-eye imagery to significant closed-eye visuals, visual distortions such as walls dissolving, thinking changes, associative thinking, introspection, and insights. Other effects included a "marvelous feeling inside", euphoria, feeling energetic, easy talking and talkativeness, relaxation, disinhibition, feeling connected and bonded with others, and subjective effects being more based in feelings than cognitive. No hangover was reported. It was said that no one was reluctant to repeat the experience. Alcohol was reported to potentiate or rekindle the effects of metaescaline in a TOMSO-like manner in one report.

Metaescaline was variously described as a "sterner mescaline" and as "not dramatic like some psychedelics". Unlike mescaline or peyote, there was little body discomfort, no nausea, and only occasional hyperreflexia. In addition, metaescaline was said to have less exaggeration of color perception than mescaline and that music was associated with little imagery in contrast to mescaline. The transference characteristic of MDMA were said to be basically absent, but it was felt that metaescaline might nonetheless be useful for psychedelic-assisted psychotherapy purposes.

== Chemistry ==
=== Synthesis ===
The chemical synthesis of metaescaline has been described.

=== Analogues ===
Analogues of metaescaline include mescaline, escaline, metaproscaline, asymbescaline, symbescaline, and trisescaline (trescaline), among others.

== History ==
Metaescaline was mentioned in the literature by Abram Hoffer and Humphrey Osmond in their 1967 book The Hallucinogens. It was subsequently described by Alexander Shulgin and Peyton Jacob III in 1984. Following this, metaescaline was described in greater detail by Shulgin in his 1991 book PiHKAL (Phenethylamines I Have Known and Loved).

== Society and culture ==
=== Legal status ===
==== Canada ====
Metaescaline is not a controlled substance in Canada as of 2025.

==== United States ====
Metaescaline is not an explicitly controlled substance in the United States. However, it could be considered a controlled substance under the Federal Analogue Act if intended for human consumption. In addition, it may be considered scheduled as a positional isomer of 3,4,5-trimethoxyamphetamine (TMA) and escaline.

== See also ==
- Scaline
- TWEETIO § Scalines
- MME (TMA2-5-EtO)
