= List of psychedelic chemists =

This is a list of psychedelic chemists, or of chemists who first identified, isolated, and/or synthesized specific psychedelic drugs or otherwise contributed to psychedelic chemistry:

- Albert Hofmann – discovered LSD, isolated psilocybin from psilocybin-containing mushrooms and ergine (LSA) from morning glory, developed numerous lysergamides and some psilocybin analogues
- Alexander Shulgin – developed numerous psychedelic phenethylamines and tryptamines
- Alexander Shulgin Research Institute (ASRI; Nicholas V. Cozzi and Paul F. Daley) – developed ASR-2001 (2CB-5PrO) and ASR-3001 (5-MeO-iPALT), among others
- Anton Köllisch – synthesized MDMA
- Arthur Heffter – isolated mescaline from peyote
- Carina Leveriza-Franz – manufactured MDMA
- Carl Mannich – synthesized MDA
- Casey William Hardison – manufactured various psychedelics and studied 2C-T-7
- Charles D. Nichols – developed certain medically intended psychedelics such as 2C-iBu
- Daniel Trachsel – developed numerous psychedelic phenethylamines
- Darrell Lemaire – studied 2C-D as a "smart drug" and developed the TWEETIO psychedelics
- David E. Nichols – developed numerous psychedelic phenethylamines, tryptamines, and lysergamides
- David E. Olson – founder of Delix Therapeutics, developed various psychedelic-related drugs such as tabernanthalog, zalsupindole, and JRT
- David Repke – developed numerous psychedelic tryptamines
- Ernst Späth – synthesized mescaline
- Gordon Alles – discovered the effects of MDA (the first synthetic psychedelic) and other work
- Hamilton Morris – developed various psychedelics
- Jason Wallach – developed various psychedelics
- Jonathan Ott – confirmed the psychoactivity of bufotenin and identified various plants containing harmala alkaloids or DMT.
- Lizard Labs (Alexander Stratford) – developed numerous LSD prodrugs such as 1P-LSD and 1V-LSD
- Louis Lewin – attempted to isolate mescaline from peyote
- M. Mueller – described the properties and effects of 2C-EF and 2C-iBu in humans and disclosed them via Alexander Shulgin
- Matthew J. Baggott – founder of Tactogen, developed novel entactogens and psychedelics
- Michael Valentine Smith (Michael Valentine Starks) – authored the book Psychedelic Chemistry (1973)
- Nicholas Sand – manufactured LSD and DMT
- Oswaldo Gonçalves de Lima – isolated DMT
- Otakar Leminger – developed escaline, proscaline, allylescaline, and MEPEA among others
- Owsley Stanley – manufactured LSD and DOM (STP)
- P. Rausch – developed various psychedelic phenethylamines and disclosed many of them via Daniel Trachsel
- Peyton Jacob III – worked with Alexander Shulgin developing psychedelics
- Ralf Heim – developed 25I-NBOMe and other psychedelic N-benzylphenethylamines
- Richard Glennon – developed numerous psychedelic phenethylamines and tryptamines
- Richard Manske – synthesized DMT and identified and synthesized harmine and harmaline
- Robert Oberlender – a student in the lab of David E. Nichols who developed and studied various psychedelics and entactogens
- Stephen Szára – discovered the effects of DMT, developed various psychedelic DMT analogues
- Tim Scully – manufactured LSD
- Toshio Hoshino – synthesized bufotenin and 5-MeO-DMT
- Uncle Fester (Stephen Preisler) – authored the book Practical LSD Manufacture (1995)
- William Leonard Pickard – manufactured LSD and tested other psychedelics like 5-fluoro-AMT, 6-fluoro-AMT, and likely LSZ
- Willy Myco – makes videos on how to make psychedelic drugs such as LSD

== See also ==
- List of chemists
- List of psychedelic drugs
- List of psychedelic pharmaceutical companies
