= C11H17NO2S =

Molecular formula

The molecular formula C_{11}H_{17}NO_{2}S (molar mass : 227.32 g/mol) may refer to:

- 2C-T, a psychedelic drug
- Thioisomescalines
  - 2-Thioisomescaline
  - 3-Thioisomescaline
  - 4-Thioisomescaline
- Thiomescalines
  - 3-Thiomescaline
  - 4-Thiomescaline
