= Propynyl (drug) =

Clinical data
- Other names: PROPYNYL; 4-Propynyloxy-3,5-dimethoxyphenethylamine; Propynylmescaline; Propynylscaline
- Routes of administration: Oral
- Drug class: Psychoactive drug
- ATC code: None

Pharmacokinetic data
- Duration of action: 8–12 hours

Identifiers
- IUPAC name: 2-{3,5-dimethoxy-4-[(prop-2-yn-1-yl)oxy]phenyl}ethan-1-amine
- CAS Number: 952017-05-9
- PubChem CID: 44719613
- ChemSpider: 21106371
- UNII: 5AG5MZJ75G
- CompTox Dashboard (EPA): DTXSID50660375

Chemical and physical data
- Formula: C_{13}H_{17}NO_{3}
- Molar mass: 235.283 g·mol^{−1}
- 3D model (JSmol): Interactive image
- SMILES: COc1cc(cc(OC)c1OCC#C)CCN
- InChI: InChI=1S/C13H17NO3/c1-4-7-17-13-11(15-2)8-10(5-6-14)9-12(13)16-3/h1,8-9H,5-7,14H2,2-3H3; Key:KNIWBMMJSJHUJB-UHFFFAOYSA-N

Propynyl, also known as 4-propynyloxy-3,5-dimethoxyphenethylamine or as propynylscaline, is a psychoactive drug of the scaline family related to mescaline. It is the derivative of mescaline in which the methoxy group at the 4 position has been replaced with a propynyloxy group.

In his book PiHKAL (Phenethylamines I Have Known and Loved), Alexander Shulgin lists propynyl's dose as 80 mg or more orally and its duration as 8 to 12 hours. The effects of propynyl have been reported to include "[not] that much mental stuff", obviously altered behavior, body load, physical fuzziness, cold feet, and next-day hangover or after-effects such as sluggishness. The drug produced no visual changes or closed-eye visuals, and clear hallucinogenic effects were not described. Higher doses than 80 mg orally were not explored, but there was no suggestion of value in exploring higher levels.

The chemical synthesis of propynyl has been described. Analogues of propynyl include mescaline, escaline, proscaline, allylescaline, and methallylescaline, among others.

Propynyl was first described in the literature by Shulgin in PiHKAL in 1991. It is not a controlled substance in Canada as of 2025.

== See also ==
- Scaline
