= Thioproscaline =

Clinical data
- Other names: TP; 4-Thioproscaline; 4-TP; 3,5-Dimethoxy-4-propylthiophenethylamine; 4-Propylthio-3,5-dimethoxyphenethylamine
- Routes of administration: Oral
- Drug class: Serotonergic psychedelic; Hallucinogen
- ATC code: None

Pharmacokinetic data
- Onset of action: >2 hours
- Duration of action: 10–15 hours

Identifiers
- IUPAC name: 2-[3,5-dimethoxy-4-(propylsulfanyl)phenyl]ethan-1-amine
- CAS Number: 90109-55-0
- PubChem CID: 44349931
- ChemSpider: 21106393
- UNII: BT7M7F9C8C
- ChEMBL: ChEMBL127855
- CompTox Dashboard (EPA): DTXSID00658368

Chemical and physical data
- Formula: C_{13}H_{21}NO_{2}S
- Molar mass: 255.38 g·mol^{−1}
- 3D model (JSmol): Interactive image
- SMILES: COc1cc(cc(OC)c1SCCC)CCN
- InChI: InChI=1S/C13H21NO2S/c1-4-7-17-13-11(15-2)8-10(5-6-14)9-12(13)16-3/h8-9H,4-7,14H2,1-3H3; Key:BQFDSMXQCJFKCH-UHFFFAOYSA-N

Thioproscaline (TP), or 4-thioproscaline (4-TP), also known as 3,5-dimethoxy-4-propylthiophenethylamine, is a psychedelic drug of the phenethylamine and scaline families related to mescaline. It is the analogue of proscaline in which the propoxy group at the 4 position has been replaced with a propylthio group.

In his book PiHKAL (Phenethylamines I Have Known and Loved) and other publications, Alexander Shulgin lists thioproscaline's dose as 20 to 25 mg orally and its duration as 10 to 15 hours. Its onset is more than 2 hours. The drug has approximately 10 to 16 times the potency of mescaline. The effects of thioproscaline have been reported to include extremely rich closed-eye imagery, quite a bit of open-eye visuals, body load, body heaviness, heavy pressure at the back of the neck, feeling vulnerable, dizziness, and hyperreflexia. It was remarked that the psychoactive effects did not seem to be worth the physical side effects, although it was suggested that lower doses might be better.

The chemical synthesis of thioproscaline has been described.

Thioproscaline was first described in the scientific literature by Alexander Shulgin and Peyton Jacob III in 1984. Subsequently, it was described in greater detail by Shulgin in PiHKAL in 1991. The drug is not a controlled substance in Canada as of 2025.

== See also ==
- Scaline
- 4-Thiomescaline
- 4-Thioescaline
- Thiobuscaline
