= Isobuscaline =

Clinical data
- Other names: 4-Isobutoxy-3,5-dimethoxyphenethylamine; 3,5-Dimethoxy-4-isobutoxyphenethylamine
- Routes of administration: Oral
- Drug class: Serotonergic psychedelic; Hallucinogen
- ATC code: None

Pharmacokinetic data
- Duration of action: 8–14 hours

Identifiers
- IUPAC name: 2-[3,5-dimethoxy-4-(2-methylpropoxy)phenyl]ethanamine
- CAS Number: 501700-05-6
- PubChem CID: 57478628
- ChemSpider: 38643131

Chemical and physical data
- Formula: C_{14}H_{23}NO_{3}
- Molar mass: 253.342 g·mol^{−1}
- 3D model (JSmol): Interactive image
- SMILES: CC(C)COC1=C(C=C(C=C1OC)CCN)OC
- InChI: InChI=1S/C14H23NO3/c1-10(2)9-18-14-12(16-3)7-11(5-6-15)8-13(14)17-4/h7-8,10H,5-6,9,15H2,1-4H3; Key:KNAFUDQAABKKDG-UHFFFAOYSA-N

Isobuscaline (IB), also known as 4-isobutoxy-3,5-dimethoxyphenethylamine, is a psychedelic drug of the phenethylamine and scaline families related to mescaline. It is the analogue and skeletal isomer of buscaline in which there is an isobutoxy group instead of a butoxy group at the 4 position. The drug's dose range is 60 to 100 mg orally and its duration is 8 to 14 hours. Its effects included little in the way of psychedelic visuals, no enhanced fantasy, and body load. The chemical synthesis of isobuscaline has been described. The drug was described in the scientific literature by Daniel Trachsel in 2002. It is not a controlled substance in Canada as of 2025.

== See also ==
- Scaline
- Buscaline
- Isoproscaline
