= 3-Thiotrisescaline =

Clinical data
- Other names: 3-T-TRIS; 3-Thiotrescaline; 3-Ethylthio-4,5-diethoxyphenethylamine; 3,4-Diethoxy-5-ethylthiophenethylamine
- Routes of administration: Oral
- ATC code: None

Pharmacokinetic data
- Duration of action: Unknown

Identifiers
- IUPAC name: 2-(3,4-diethoxy-5-ethylsulfanylphenyl)ethanamine
- CAS Number: 90132-53-9
- PubChem CID: 44374795
- ChemSpider: 21106413
- UNII: XZ4SX4PQ5D
- ChEMBL: ChEMBL161175

Chemical and physical data
- Formula: C_{14}H_{23}NO_{2}S
- Molar mass: 269.40 g·mol^{−1}
- 3D model (JSmol): Interactive image
- SMILES: CCOC1=C(C(=CC(=C1)CCN)SCC)OCC
- InChI: InChI=1S/C14H23NO2S/c1-4-16-12-9-11(7-8-15)10-13(18-6-3)14(12)17-5-2/h9-10H,4-8,15H2,1-3H3; Key:JSWFZFXPKROBKR-UHFFFAOYSA-N

3-Thiotrisescaline (3-T-TRIS), also known as 3-thiotrescaline or as 3-ethylthio-4,5-diethoxyphenethylamine, is a chemical compound of the phenethylamine and scaline families related to mescaline. It is the analogue of trisescaline (TRIS; trescaline) in which the ethoxy group at the 3 position has been replaced with an ethylthio group. The drug is one of two possible thiotrisescaline (T-TRIS; thiotrescaline) positional isomers, the other being 4-thiotrisescaline (4-T-TRIS; 4-thiotrescaline).

In his book PiHKAL (Phenethylamines I Have Known and Loved) and other publications, Alexander Shulgin lists 3-T-TRIS's dose as greater than 160 mg orally and its duration as unknown. 3-T-TRIS produced no effects at tested doses of up to 160 mg orally, with the exception of possible neurological irritability 9 or 10 hours after administration. Shulgin concluded that the compound is inactive.

The chemical synthesis of 3-T-TRIS has been described.

3-T-TRIS was first described in the scientific literature by Shulgin and Peyton Jacob III in 1984. Subsequently, it was described in greater detail by Shulgin in PiHKAL in 1991.

== See also ==
- Scaline
- 4-Thiotrisescaline
