= 4-Thiotrisescaline =

Clinical data
- Other names: 4-T-TRIS; 4-Thiotrescaline; 4-Ethylthio-3,5-diethoxyphenethylamine; 3,5-Diethoxy-4-ethylthiophenethylamine
- Routes of administration: Oral
- ATC code: None

Pharmacokinetic data
- Duration of action: Unknown

Identifiers
- IUPAC name: 2-(3,5-diethoxy-4-ethylsulfanylphenyl)ethanamine
- CAS Number: 90109-53-8
- PubChem CID: 44374794
- ChemSpider: 21106395
- UNII: 5DH3K643ED
- ChEMBL: ChEMBL346688
- CompTox Dashboard (EPA): DTXSID40658549

Chemical and physical data
- Formula: C_{14}H_{23}NO_{2}S
- Molar mass: 269.40 g·mol^{−1}
- 3D model (JSmol): Interactive image
- SMILES: CCOC1=CC(=CC(=C1SCC)OCC)CCN
- InChI: InChI=1S/C14H23NO2S/c1-4-16-12-9-11(7-8-15)10-13(17-5-2)14(12)18-6-3/h9-10H,4-8,15H2,1-3H3; Key:VFCYKJRATPCSED-UHFFFAOYSA-N

4-Thiotrisescaline (4-T-TRIS), also known as 4-thiotrescaline or as 4-ethylthio-3,5-diethoxyphenethylamine, is a chemical compound of the phenethylamine and scaline families related to mescaline. It is the analogue of trisescaline (TRIS; trescaline) in which the ethoxy group at the 4 position has been replaced with an ethylthio group. The drug is one of two possible thiotrisescaline (T-TRIS; thiotrescaline) positional isomers, the other being 3-thiotrisescaline (3-T-TRIS; 3-thiotrescaline).

In his book PiHKAL (Phenethylamines I Have Known and Loved) and other publications, Alexander Shulgin lists 4-T-TRIS's dose as greater than 200 mg orally and its duration as unknown. The effects of 4-T-TRIS have been reported to include possibly some physical effects, slight tingling or numbing of hands and fingers, gas, and no mental effects at a dose of 120 mg orally in one report. However, in another report in which a higher dose of 200 mg orally was used, there were, aside from a brief passing awareness, no physical or mental effects whatsoever. Shulgin concluded that the compound is inactive.

The chemical synthesis of 4-T-TRIS has been described.

4-T-TRIS was first described in the scientific literature by Shulgin and Peyton Jacob III in 1984. Subsequently, it was described in greater detail by Shulgin in PiHKAL in 1991.

== See also ==
- Scaline
- 3-Thiotrisescaline
