= C14H21NO3 =

The molecular formula C_{14}H_{21}NO_{3} (molar mass : 251.32 g/mol) may refer to:

- 3C-AL
- Cyclopropylmescaline
- Methallylescaline
- O-Methylpellotine
- 1-(2-Nitrophenoxy)octane
- Peyotine
- Pivenfrine
- MALM (drug)
