= Asymbescaline =

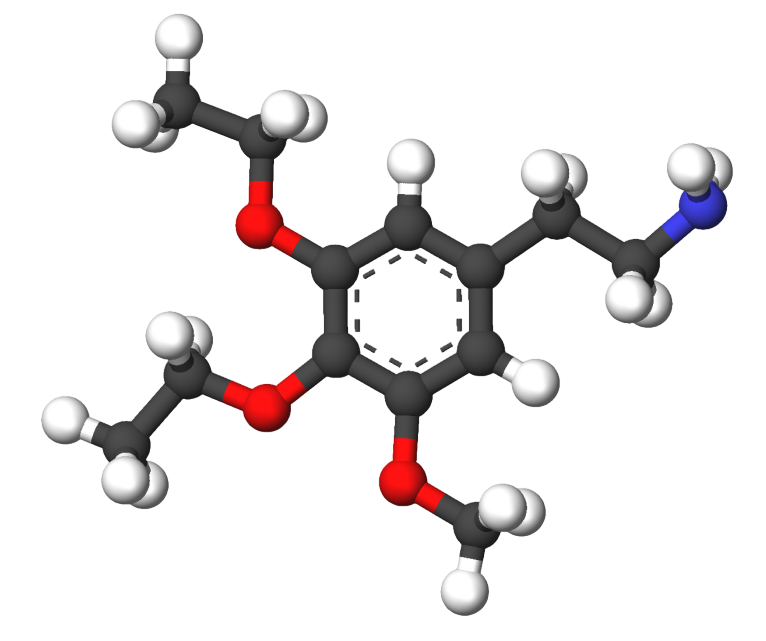

Clinical data
- Other names: ASB; 3,4-Diethoxy-5-methoxyphenethylamine
- Routes of administration: Oral
- Drug class: Serotonergic psychedelic; Hallucinogen
- ATC code: None

Pharmacokinetic data
- Onset of action: Peak: 2 hours
- Duration of action: 10–15 hours

Identifiers
- IUPAC name: 2-(3,4-diethoxy-5-methoxyphenyl)ethan-1-amine
- CAS Number: 63918-08-1
- PubChem CID: 45367
- ChemSpider: 41279
- UNII: F5H6Z6VQ2Z
- ChEMBL: ChEMBL124125
- CompTox Dashboard (EPA): DTXSID20213690

Chemical and physical data
- Formula: C_{13}H_{21}NO_{3}
- Molar mass: 239.315 g·mol^{−1}
- 3D model (JSmol): Interactive image
- SMILES: O(c1c(OC)cc(cc1OCC)CCN)CC
- InChI: InChI=1S/C13H21NO3/c1-4-16-12-9-10(6-7-14)8-11(15-3)13(12)17-5-2/h8-9H,4-7,14H2,1-3H3; Key:VFOAVFQWZYUFQZ-UHFFFAOYSA-N

Asymbescaline (ASB), also known as 3,4-diethoxy-5-methoxyphenethylamine, is a psychedelic drug of the phenethylamine and scaline families related to mescaline. It is the analogue of mescaline in which the methoxy groups at the 3 and 4 positions have been replaced with ethoxy groups.

== Use and effects ==
In his book PiHKAL (Phenethylamines I Have Known and Loved) and other publications, Alexander Shulgin lists asymbescaline's dose as 200 to 280 mg orally and its duration as 10 to 15 hours. The time to peak was approximately 2 hours.

The effects of asymbescaline were reported to include a lack of visual and interpretive richness, few if any of the "open interactions" of other psychedelics like 2C-B or LSD, daydreaming, and visions while trying to sleep, and "some negative side". One report described it as a "sort of gentler sister of mescaline", but with a tendency to emphasize the negative such as sadness and struggle. Another report described it as "like being in a corridor outside the lighted halls where a beautiful mescaline experience is taking place, sensing the light from behind a grey door, and not being able to find my way in from the dusky underside passageways". Physical and other side effects included some "body load, physical weirdness, heart rate changes, and insomnia and sleep disruption. Per Shulgin, the consensus from over a half dozen tests was that there was not enough value with the drug to offset its body load.

== Chemistry ==
=== Synthesis ===
The chemical synthesis of asymbescaline has been described.

=== Analogues ===
Analogues of asymbescaline include mescaline, escaline, metaescaline, symbescaline, and trisescaline (trescaline), among others.

== History ==
Asymbescaline was first described in the scientific literature by George S. Grace in 1934. Subsequently, it was described in greater detail by Alexander Shulgin in his 1991 book PiHKAL (Phenethylamines I Have Known and Loved).

== Society and culture ==
=== Legal status ===
==== Canada ====
Asymbescaline is not a controlled substance in Canada as of 2025.

== See also ==
- Scaline
- TWEETIO § Scalines
