= Thiobuscaline =

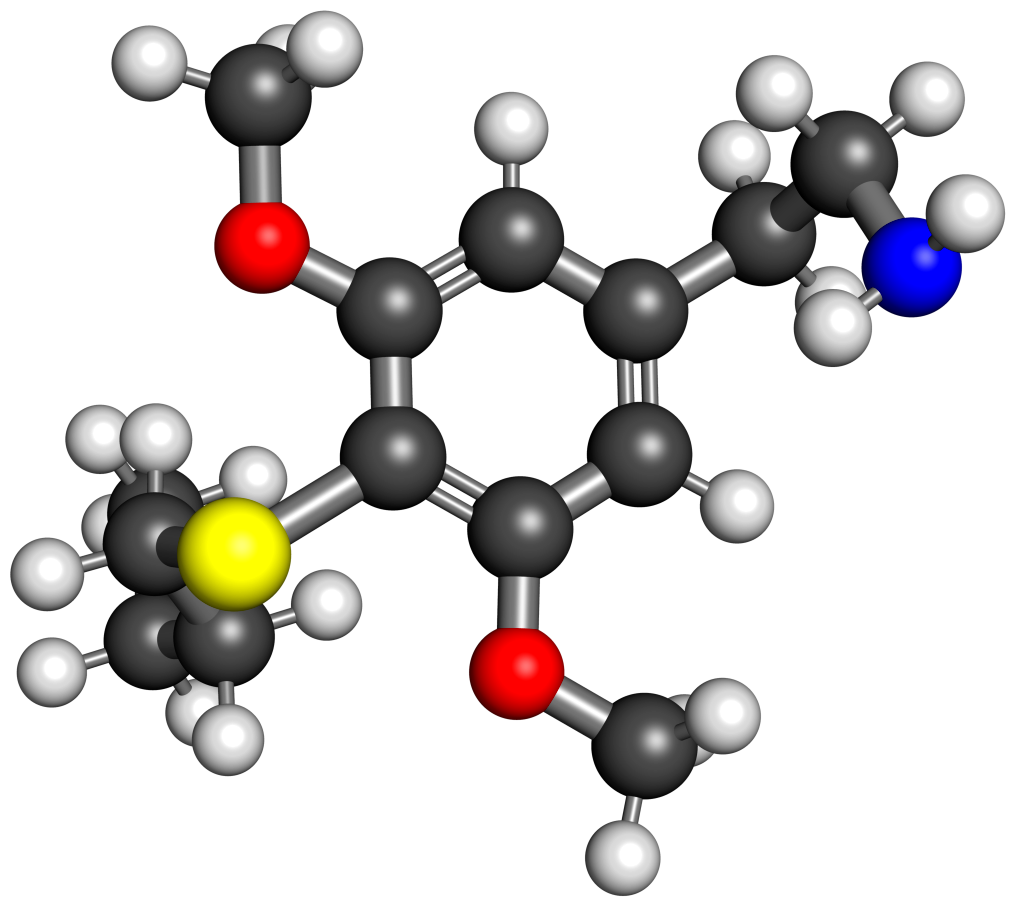

Clinical data
- Other names: TB; 4-Thiobuscaline; 4-TB; 4-Butylthio-3,5-dimethoxyphenethylamine; 3,5-Dimethoxy-4-butylthiophenethylamine
- Routes of administration: Oral
- Drug class: Non-hallucinogenic serotonin 5-HT_{2A} and 5-HT_{2C} receptor agonist; Psychoactive drug; Antidepressant
- ATC code: None

Pharmacokinetic data
- Onset of action: ~1 hour
- Duration of action: ~8 hours

Identifiers
- IUPAC name: 2-[4-(butylsulfanyl)-3,5-dimethoxyphenyl]ethan-1-amine
- CAS Number: 90109-57-2
- PubChem CID: 44349865
- ChemSpider: 21106390
- UNII: 45ZTS7GX2F
- ChEMBL: ChEMBL123840
- CompTox Dashboard (EPA): DTXSID80658366

Chemical and physical data
- Formula: C_{14}H_{23}NO_{2}S
- Molar mass: 269.40 g·mol^{−1}
- 3D model (JSmol): Interactive image
- SMILES: COc1cc(cc(OC)c1SCCCC)CCN
- InChI: InChI=1S/C14H23NO2S/c1-4-5-8-18-14-12(16-2)9-11(6-7-15)10-13(14)17-3/h9-10H,4-8,15H2,1-3H3; Key:CPNWMHCBHUXITO-UHFFFAOYSA-N

Thiobuscaline (TB), or 4-thiobuscaline (4-TB), also known as 3,5-dimethoxy-4-butylthiophenethylamine, is a psychoactive drug of the phenethylamine and scaline families related to the psychedelic drug mescaline. It is the analogue of buscaline in which the butoxy group at the 4 position has been replaced with a butylthio group. The drug is a non-hallucinogenic serotonin 5-HT_{2A} receptor agonist with similar effects and potential uses to those of Ariadne.

== Use and effects ==
In his book PiHKAL (Phenethylamines I Have Known And Loved) and other publications, Alexander Shulgin lists thiobuscaline's dose range as 60 to 120 mg orally and its duration as about 8 hours. Its onset is about 1 hour. The effects of thiobuscaline have been reported to include a "benign and beautiful experience which never quite popped into anything psychedelic", subtle threshold effects, a vague awareness of something, being in a "wonderful place spiritually" but with "some dark edges", it being "pleasant, but certainly not psychedelic", and body discomfort. No clear hallucinogenic effects were described. Thiobuscaline is listed as being 4 times more potent as a psychoactive drug than mescaline.

Thiobuscaline produced perpetual threshold psychoactive effects that did not further increase across a wide dose range of 35 to 120 mg orally. Shulgin described it as "always the simple and ephemeral catalyst of euphoria without substance and without body". In addition, he said that it could not easily be classified, for instance as a psychedelic or stimulant. Instead, Shulgin likened thiobuscaline to Ariadne (4C-D), which he noted had been called an "antidepressant". He hypothesized that thiobuscaline might be beneficial for treatment of depression in certain people in the exact same way as Ariadne.

== Pharmacology ==
=== Pharmacodynamics ===
Thiobuscaline shows affinity for the serotonin 5-HT_{2A} receptor (K_{i} = 602 nM). It is a potent near-full agonist of the serotonin 5-HT_{2A} and 5-HT_{2C} receptors and to a much lesser extent a moderate-efficacy partial agonist of the serotonin 5-HT_{2B} receptor, with EC_{50} (E_{max}) values of 3.86 nM (114%) at the serotonin 5-HT_{2A} receptor, 89.6 nM (55.7%) at the serotonin 5-HT_{2B} receptor, and 8.86 nM (95.9%) at the serotonin 5-HT_{2C} receptor. Conversely, it was inactive as an agonist of the serotonin 5-HT_{1A} receptor. The drug produces the head-twitch response, a behavioral proxy of psychedelic effects, in rodents.

=== Pharmacokinetics ===
The in-vitro metabolism of thiobuscaline has been studied.

== Chemistry ==
=== Synthesis ===
The chemical synthesis of thiobuscaline has been described.

=== Analogues ===
Analogues of thiobuscaline include 4-thiomescaline, 4-thioescaline, and thioproscaline (4-thioproscaline), among others.

== History ==
Thiobuscaline was first described in the scientific literature by Alexander Shulgin and Peyton Jacob III in 1984. Subsequently, it was described in greater detail by Shulgin in his book PiHKAL (Phenethylamines I Have Known and Loved) in 1991.

== Society and culture ==
=== Legal status ===
==== Canada ====
Thiobuscaline is not a controlled substance in Canada as of 2025.

==== United States ====
Thiobuscaline is not an explicitly controlled substance in the United States. However, it could be considered a controlled substance under the Federal Analogue Act if intended for human consumption.

== See also ==
- Scaline
- Ariadne
- ASR-2001 (2CB-5PrO)
- AB-300
