= MAPEA =

Clinical data
- Other names: 3-Methoxy-4-allyloxyphenethylamine; 4-Allyloxy-3-methoxyphenethylamine; ALLOMPEA; 3-Desmethoxyallylescaline
- Routes of administration: Oral
- Drug class: Psychoactive drug; "Mood elevator"
- ATC code: None

Identifiers
- IUPAC name: 2-(3-methoxy-4-prop-2-enoxyphenyl)ethanamine
- CAS Number: 39201-81-5
- PubChem CID: 14622431
- ChemSpider: 15382929

Chemical and physical data
- Formula: C_{12}H_{17}NO_{2}
- Molar mass: 207.273 g·mol^{−1}
- 3D model (JSmol): Interactive image
- SMILES: COC1=C(C=CC(=C1)CCN)OCC=C
- InChI: InChI=1S/C12H17NO2/c1-3-8-15-11-5-4-10(6-7-13)9-12(11)14-2/h3-5,9H,1,6-8,13H2,2H3; Key:DVMQMRGYKZBKKX-UHFFFAOYSA-N

MAPEA, also known as 3-methoxy-4-allyloxyphenethylamine or as 3-desmethoxyallylescaline, is a psychoactive drug of the phenethylamine family related to the psychedelic drug and scaline allylescaline. It is the 3-desmethoxy analogue of allylescaline. The drug is said to be a "mood elevator" at doses of 100 to 300 mg orally, in contrast to related drugs like allylescaline which are psychedelic hallucinogens. The chemical synthesis of MAPEA has been described. MAPEA was first described in the scientific literature by Otakar Leminger in 1972. Subsequent, it was further described by Alexander Shulgin in his book PiHKAL (Phenethylamines I Have Known and Loved) in 1991.

== See also ==
- Substituted methoxyphenethylamine
- Scaline § Related compounds
- 3-Methoxy-4-ethoxyphenethylamine (MEPEA; 3-desmethoxyescaline)
- 3,4-Dimethoxyphenethylamine (DMPEA; 3-desmethoxymescaline)
