= Otakar Leminger =

Czech chemist

- Occupation: Chemist
- Known for: Synthesis of phenelzine, scaline psychedelics and related drugs, and other contributions

Otakar Leminger was a Czech chemist known for work in the area of psychopharmacology. He is more specifically known for the synthesis of the monoamine oxidase inhibitor (MAOI) antidepressant phenelzine (phenethylhydrazine) with Emil Votoček in 1932 and for the synthesis and testing of several scaline psychedelics and related drugs including escaline, proscaline, allylescaline, 3C-P, 3-methoxy-4-ethoxyphenethylamine (MEPEA), and 3-methoxy-4-allyloxyphenethylamine (MAPEA) in 1972. He worked in Prague and lived in Ústí nad Labem in northern Czechoslovakia. Leminger worked in industry for years before publishing on psychedelics in his retirement. Alexander Shulgin reviewed Leminger's work on psychedelics in his 1991 book PiHKAL (Phenethylamines I Have Known and Loved), by which point Leminger had passed away.

== See also ==
- List of psychedelic chemists
