= Metaproscaline =

Clinical data
- Other names: MP; 3,4-Dimethoxy-5-propoxyphenethylamine; 3-Propoxy-4,5-dimethoxyphenethylamine
- Routes of administration: Oral
- ATC code: None

Pharmacokinetic data
- Duration of action: Unknown

Identifiers
- IUPAC name: 2-(3,4-dimethoxy-5-propoxyphenyl)ethanamine
- CAS Number: 90132-33-5
- PubChem CID: 44375097
- ChemSpider: 21106345
- UNII: BE9PTC7J7P
- ChEMBL: ChEMBL161588
- CompTox Dashboard (EPA): DTXSID10658556

Chemical and physical data
- Formula: C_{13}H_{21}NO_{3}
- Molar mass: 239.315 g·mol^{−1}
- 3D model (JSmol): Interactive image
- SMILES: COc1c(cc(cc1OCCC)CCN)OC
- InChI: InChI=1S/C13H21NO3/c1-4-7-17-12-9-10(5-6-14)8-11(15-2)13(12)16-3/h8-9H,4-7,14H2,1-3H3; Key:LRMHEQAATQTVRI-UHFFFAOYSA-N

Metaproscaline (MP), also known as 3,4-dimethoxy-5-propoxyphenethylamine, is a chemical compound of the phenethylamine and scaline families related to mescaline. It is the derivative of mescaline in which the methoxy group at the 3 position has been replaced with a propoxy group. In addition, it is a positional isomer of proscaline.

In his book PiHKAL (Phenethylamines I Have Known and Loved) and other publications, Alexander Shulgin lists metaproscaline's dose as greater than 240 mg orally and its duration as unknown. The drug produced no clear effects at tested doses of up to 240 mg orally.

The chemical synthesis of metaproscaline has been described. Analogues of metaproscaline include mescaline, proscaline, and metaescaline, among others.

Metaproscaline was first described in the scientific literature by Shulgin and Peyton Jacob III in 1984. Subsequently, it was described in greater detail by Shulgin in PiHKAL in 1991. The drug is not a controlled substance in Canada as of 2025.

== See also ==
- Scaline
- TWEETIO § Scalines
- Metaescaline
- Proscaline
