= Trifluoroproscaline =

Clinical data
- Other names: TFP; 3,3,3-Trifluoroproscaline; 3,3,3-TFP; 4-(3,3,3-Trifluoropropoxy)-3,5-dimethoxyphenethylamine; 3,5-Dimethoxy-4-(3,3,3-trifluoropropoxy)phenethylamine
- Routes of administration: Oral
- Drug class: Serotonin receptor modulator; Serotonin 5-HT_{2A} receptor agonist; Serotonergic psychedelic; Hallucinogen
- ATC code: None

Pharmacokinetic data
- Duration of action: Unknown

Identifiers
- IUPAC name: 2-[3,5-dimethoxy-4-(3,3,3-trifluoropropoxy)phenyl]ethanamine
- CAS Number: 1465677-94-4
- PubChem CID: 64565107
- ChemSpider: 46326946

Chemical and physical data
- Formula: C_{13}H_{18}F_{3}NO_{3}
- Molar mass: 293.286 g·mol^{−1}
- 3D model (JSmol): Interactive image
- SMILES: COC1=CC(=CC(=C1OCCC(F)(F)F)OC)CCN
- InChI: InChI=1S/C13H18F3NO3/c1-18-10-7-9(3-5-17)8-11(19-2)12(10)20-6-4-13(14,15)16/h7-8H,3-6,17H2,1-2H3; Key:SANRTCNYSAUXOQ-UHFFFAOYSA-N

Trifluoroproscaline (TFP), also known as 4-(3,3,3-trifluoropropoxy)-3,5-dimethoxyphenethylamine, is a psychedelic drug of the phenethylamine and scaline families related to mescaline. It is a trifluorinated derivative of proscaline. Based on limited trials, trifluoroproscaline is active at a dose of 33 to 66 mg or more orally and its duration is unknown. Initial trials provided evidence of effects including good fantasy and slight color intensification. The drug might be less potent than proscaline similarly to fluoroproscaline. It acts as a low-potency serotonin 5-HT_{2A} receptor partial agonist and also interacts with other serotonin receptors and targets. Trifluoroproscaline was first described in the scientific literature by Daniel Trachsel in 2012. Its pharmacology was subsequently studied in greater detail in 2021. It is not a controlled substance in Canada as of 2025.

== See also ==
- Scaline
- Fluoroproscaline
- Trifluoromescaline
- Trifluoroescaline
- Difluoromescaline
- Difluoroescaline
