= Difluoroescaline =

Clinical data
- Other names: DFE; 2,2-DFE; F_{2}EM; 4-(2,2-Difluoroethoxy)-3,5-dimethoxyphenethylamine; 3,5-Dimethoxy-4-(2,2-difluoroethoxy)phenethylamine
- Routes of administration: Oral
- Drug class: Serotonin receptor modulator; Serotonin 5-HT_{2A} receptor agonist; Serotonergic psychedelic; Hallucinogen
- ATC code: None

Pharmacokinetic data
- Duration of action: 6–12 hours

Identifiers
- IUPAC name: 2-[4-(2,2-difluoroethoxy)-3,5-dimethoxyphenyl]ethanamine
- CAS Number: 501700-02-3
- PubChem CID: 54939674
- ChemSpider: 33260782

Chemical and physical data
- Formula: C_{12}H_{17}F_{2}NO_{3}
- Molar mass: 261.269 g·mol^{−1}
- 3D model (JSmol): Interactive image
- SMILES: COC1=CC(=CC(=C1OCC(F)F)OC)CCN
- InChI: InChI=1S/C12H17F2NO3/c1-16-9-5-8(3-4-15)6-10(17-2)12(9)18-7-11(13)14/h5-6,11H,3-4,7,15H2,1-2H3; Key:PCAYHBWBNGPKII-UHFFFAOYSA-N

Difluoroescaline (DFE), also known as 4-(2,2-difluoroethoxy)-3,5-dimethoxyphenethylamine, is a psychedelic drug of the phenethylamine and scaline families related to mescaline. It is a difluorinated derivative of escaline.

Its dose range is 40 to 80 mg and its duration is 6 to 12 hours. The drug's effects include color enhancement, some closed-eye and open-eye visuals, emotional changes, and some physical discomfort.

It acts as a low-potency partial agonist of the serotonin 5-HT_{2A} receptor and also interacts with other serotonin receptors and targets.

The chemical synthesis of difluoroescaline has been described.

Difluoroescaline was first described in the scientific literature by Daniel Trachsel in 2002. Its pharmacology was studied in more detail in 2021. It is not a controlled substance in Canada as of 2025.

== See also ==
- Scaline
- Trifluoroescaline
- Difluoromescaline
- Metadifluoromescaline
- Fluoroescaline
- Trifluoromescaline
- Fluoroproscaline
- Trifluoroproscaline
