= Cyclopropylmescaline =

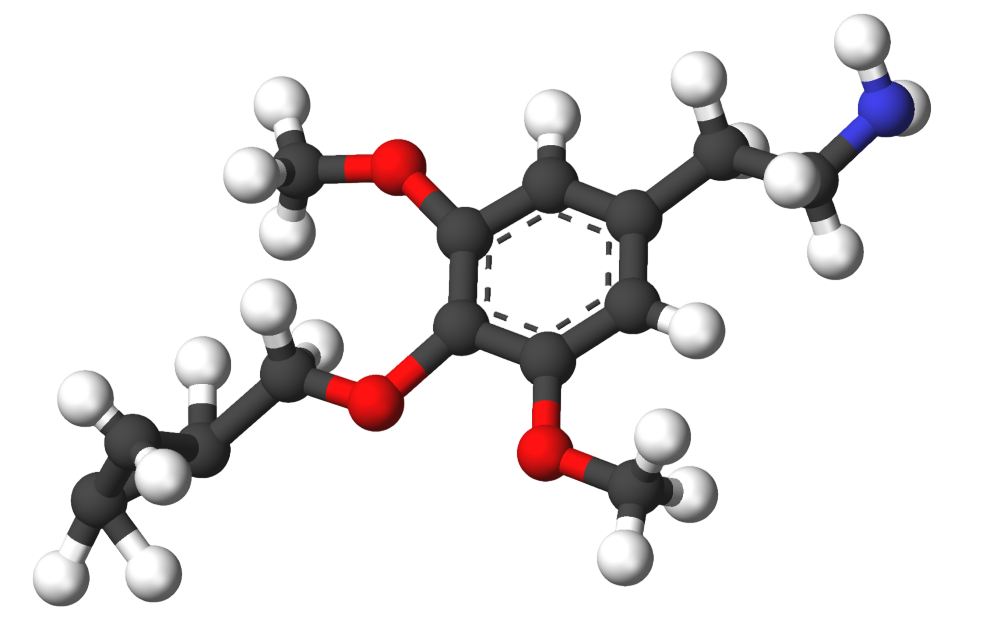

Clinical data
- Other names: CPM; 4-Cyclopropylmethoxy-3,5-methoxyphenethylamine
- Routes of administration: Oral
- Drug class: Serotonin 5-HT_{2} receptor agonist; Serotonin 5-HT_{2A} receptor agonist; Serotonergic psychedelic; Hallucinogen
- ATC code: None

Pharmacokinetic data
- Onset of action: ≤20 minutes
- Duration of action: 12–18 hours

Identifiers
- IUPAC name: 2-[4-(cyclopropylmethoxy)-3,5-dimethoxyphenyl]ethan-1-amine
- CAS Number: 207740-23-6
- PubChem CID: 44350143
- ChemSpider: 21106288
- UNII: D9268U4GS8
- ChEMBL: ChEMBL421458
- CompTox Dashboard (EPA): DTXSID60658384

Chemical and physical data
- Formula: C_{14}H_{21}NO_{3}
- Molar mass: 251.326 g·mol^{−1}
- 3D model (JSmol): Interactive image
- SMILES: COc2cc(cc(OC)c2OCC1CC1)CCN
- InChI: InChI=1S/C14H21NO3/c1-16-12-7-11(5-6-15)8-13(17-2)14(12)18-9-10-3-4-10/h7-8,10H,3-6,9,15H2,1-2H3; Key:LNTBHKZMYJTHTH-UHFFFAOYSA-N

Cyclopropylmescaline (CPM), also known as 4-cyclopropylmethoxy-3,5-dimethoxyphenethylamine, is a psychedelic drug of the phenethylamine and scaline families related to mescaline. It is taken orally and has a very long duration of 12 to 18 hours.

== Use and effects ==
In his book PiHKAL (Phenethylamines I Have Known and Loved) and other publications, Alexander Shulgin lists CPM's dose as 60 to 80 mg orally and its duration as 12 to 18 hours. Its onset is within 20 minutes and peak effects occurred at around 1.5 hours. The drug is approximately 5 times as potent as mescaline and is longer-lasting in comparison.

The effects of CPM have been reported to include remarkable closed-eye visuals and fantasy, mental imagery synchronized with music, not much in terms of open-eye visuals, heightened tactile awareness, not much insight, daydreaming about eroticism, feeling exposed and vulnerable, sounds including voices and even music feeling intrusive and irritating, and interference with sleep and feeling tired due to its very long duration.

== Pharmacology ==
=== Pharmacodynamics ===
CPM acts as a serotonin 5-HT_{2} receptor full agonist, including of the serotonin 5-HT_{2A}, 5-HT_{2B}, and 5-HT_{2C} receptors.

== Chemistry ==
=== Synthesis ===
The chemical synthesis of CPM has been described.

=== Analogues ===
Analogues of CPM include mescaline, escaline, proscaline, allylescaline, methallylescaline, and cycloproscaline, among others.

== History ==
CPM was described in the scientific literature by Alexander Shulgin by 1994. Subsequently, it was further described by Shulgin in his 1991 book PiHKAL (Phenethylamines I Have Known and Loved).

== Society and culture ==
=== Legal status ===
==== Canada ====
CPM is not a controlled substance in Canada as of 2025.

== See also ==
- Scaline
