= Fluoroproscaline =

Clinical data
- Other names: FP; 3-Fluoroproscaline; 3-FP; 4-(3-Fluoropropoxy)-3,5-dimethoxyphenethylamine
- Routes of administration: Oral
- Drug class: Serotonin receptor modulator; Serotonin 5-HT_{2A} receptor agonist; Serotonergic psychedelic; Hallucinogen
- ATC code: None

Pharmacokinetic data
- Duration of action: 3–5 hours

Identifiers
- IUPAC name: 2-[4-(3-fluoropropoxy)-3,5-dimethoxyphenyl]ethanamine
- CAS Number: 501700-04-5
- PubChem CID: 57478627
- ChemSpider: 36606254

Chemical and physical data
- Formula: C_{13}H_{20}FNO_{3}
- Molar mass: 257.305 g·mol^{−1}
- 3D model (JSmol): Interactive image
- SMILES: COC1=CC(=CC(=C1OCCCF)OC)CCN
- InChI: InChI=1S/C13H20FNO3/c1-16-11-8-10(4-6-15)9-12(17-2)13(11)18-7-3-5-14/h8-9H,3-7,15H2,1-2H3; Key:FMAGEKSBHIYXPF-UHFFFAOYSA-N

Fluoroproscaline (FP), also known as 4-(3-fluoropropoxy)-3,5-dimethoxyphenethylamine, is a psychedelic drug of the phenethylamine and scaline families related to mescaline. It is a fluorinated derivative of proscaline. The drug has a dose range of 60 to 150 mg and a duration of 3 to 5 hours. It is less potent than proscaline but more potent than mescaline and is much shorter-acting than proscaline or mescaline. The receptor interactions of fluoroproscaline have been studied. It is a low-affinity and low-potency agonist of the serotonin 5-HT_{2A} receptor. The chemical synthesis of fluoroproscaline has been described. The drug was first described in the scientific literature by Daniel Trachsel in 2002. The pharmacology of fluoroproscaline was studied in greater detail in 2021. It is not a controlled substance in Canada as of 2025.

== See also ==
- Scaline
- Trifluoroproscaline
- Fluoroescaline
- Difluoroescaline
- Trifluoroescaline
- Difluoromescaline
- Trifluoromescaline
