= 3-Thioisomescaline =

Clinical data
- Other names: 3-TIM; 2,4-Dimethoxy-3-methylthiophenethylamine; 3-Methylthio-2,4-dimethoxyphenethylamine
- Routes of administration: Oral
- ATC code: None

Pharmacokinetic data
- Duration of action: Unknown

Identifiers
- IUPAC name: 2-(2,4-dimethoxy-3-methylsulfanylphenyl)ethanamine
- CAS Number: 78335-86-1
- PubChem CID: 44276770
- ChemSpider: 23124675
- UNII: AVT7A8UN26
- ChEMBL: ChEMBL27293

Chemical and physical data
- Formula: C_{11}H_{17}NO_{2}S
- Molar mass: 227.32 g·mol^{−1}
- 3D model (JSmol): Interactive image
- SMILES: COC1=C(C(=C(C=C1)CCN)OC)SC
- InChI: InChI=1S/C11H17NO2S/c1-13-9-5-4-8(6-7-12)10(14-2)11(9)15-3/h4-5H,6-7,12H2,1-3H3; Key:LEELWLKZRKDMAS-UHFFFAOYSA-N

3-Thioisomescaline (3-TIM), also known as 2,4-dimethoxy-3-methylthiophenethylamine, is a chemical compound of the phenethylamine and scaline families related to mescaline. It is the analogue of isomescaline in which the methoxy group at the 3 position has been replaced with a methylthio group. The compound is one of two possible thioisomescaline (TIM) positional isomers, the others being 3-thioisomescaline (3-TIM) and 4-thioisomescaline (4-TIM).

In his book PiHKAL (Phenethylamines I Have Known and Loved) and other publications, Alexander Shulgin lists 3-TIM's dose as greater than 240 mg orally and its duration as unknown. The effects of 3-TIM have been reported to include possible brief alert and mild stomach upset, with no other effects observed. However, it is unclear that the preceding effects were actually caused by 3-TIM. Shulgin concluded that 3-TIM is inactive.

The chemical synthesis of 3-TIM has been described.

3-TIM was first described in the scientific literature by Shulgin and Peyton Jacob III in 1981. Subsequently, it was described in greater detail by Shulgin in PiHKAL in 1991.

== See also ==
- Scaline
- 2-Thioisomescaline
- 4-Thioisomescaline
