= Thiotrisescaline =

Thiotrisescaline (T-TRIS), also known as thiotrescaline, may refer to the following:

- 3-Thiotrisescaline (3-T-TRIS; 3-thiotrescaline)
- 4-Thiotrisescaline (4-T-TRIS; 4-thiotrescaline)

== See also ==
- Scaline
- Thiomescaline
- Thioescaline
- Thiometaescaline
- Thiosymbescaline
- Thioasymbescaline
