= Isoproscaline =

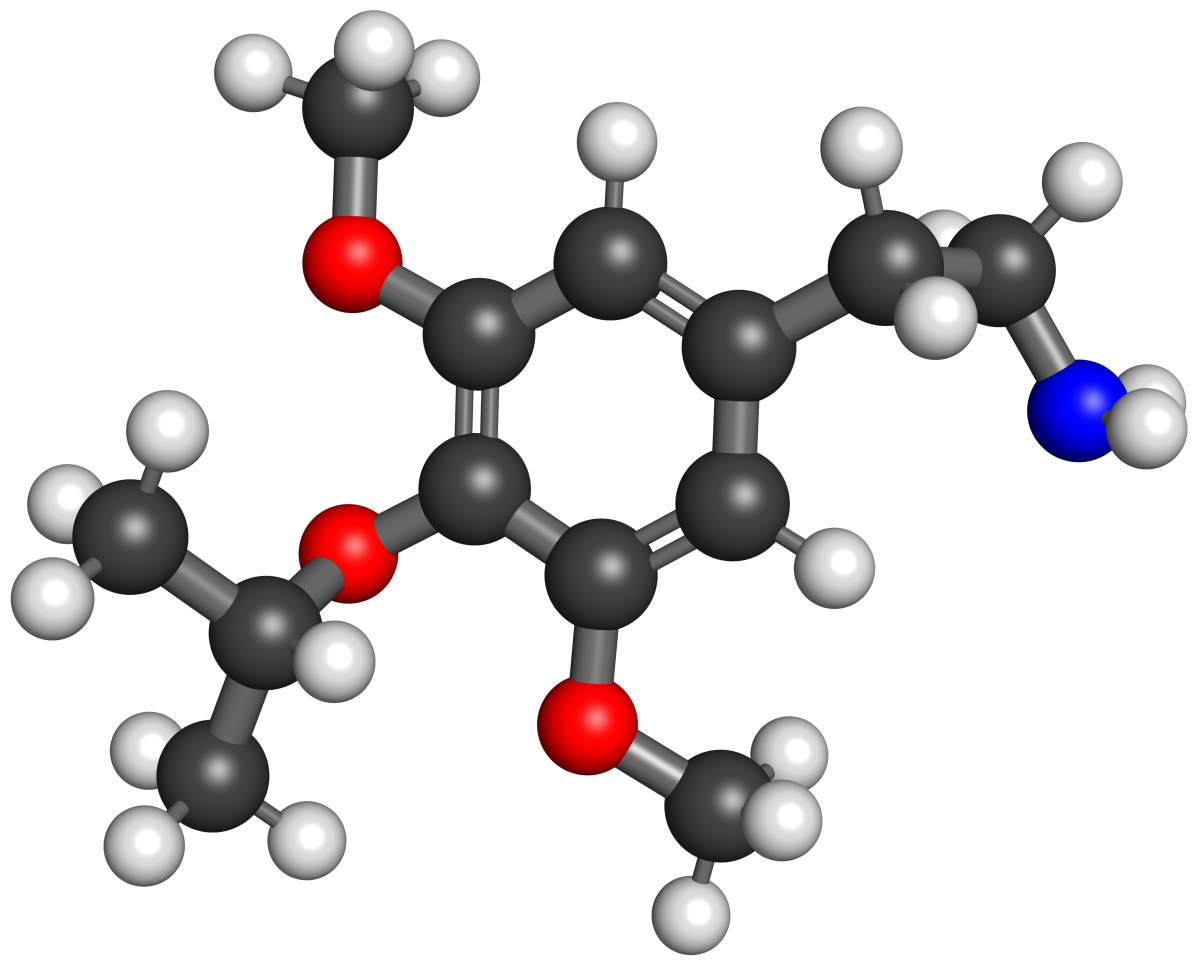

Clinical data
- Other names: IP; 4-Isopropoxy-3,5-dimethoxyphenethylamine; 3,5-Dimethoxy-4-isopropoxyphenethylamine
- Routes of administration: Oral
- Drug class: Serotonin receptor modulator; Serotonin 5-HT_{2A} receptor agonist; Serotonergic psychedelic; Hallucinogen
- ATC code: None

Pharmacokinetic data
- Onset of action: 2 hours
- Duration of action: 10–16 hours

Identifiers
- IUPAC name: 2-{3,5-dimethoxy-4-[(propan-2-yl)oxy]phenyl}ethan-1-amine
- CAS Number: 64778-72-9
- PubChem CID: 15102787
- ChemSpider: 10439597
- UNII: 7W67II88GC
- ChEMBL: ChEMBL126203
- CompTox Dashboard (EPA): DTXSID70215088

Chemical and physical data
- Formula: C_{13}H_{21}NO_{3}
- Molar mass: 239.315 g·mol^{−1}
- 3D model (JSmol): Interactive image
- Melting point: 163 to 164 °C (325 to 327 °F) (hydrochloride)
- SMILES: CC(C)Oc1c(cc(cc1OC)CCN)OC
- InChI: InChI=1S/C13H21NO3/c1-9(2)17-13-11(15-3)7-10(5-6-14)8-12(13)16-4/h7-9H,5-6,14H2,1-4H3; Key:UBNHYNYMUORHAM-UHFFFAOYSA-N

Isoproscaline, also known as 4-isopropoxy-3,5-dimethoxyphenethylamine, is a psychedelic drug of the phenethylamine and scaline families related to mescaline. It is closely related to proscaline and was first synthesized by David E. Nichols and colleagues. The drug is taken orally.

== Use and effects ==
In his book PiHKAL (Phenethylamines I Have Known and Loved), Alexander Shulgin lists isoproscaline's dose as 40 to 80 mg orally and its duration as 10 to 16 hours. The onset was described as slow and about 2 hours and the descent very slow and gradual and starting at about 6 or 7 hours. The effects of isoproscaline included enhanced emotions, desire to move and dance, feelings of energy flow and freedom in the body, feelings of ecstasy, euphoria, meaningfulness, mental rejuvenation, enhanced sociability and conversation, body load, queasiness, nausea, discomfort, insomnia, and slight next-day irritability. No visual changes or other sensory effects were mentioned. Shulgin described isoproscaline as a "completely fascinating phenethylamine".

== Pharmacology ==
=== Pharmacodynamics ===
Isoproscaline shows affinity for the serotonin 5-HT_{2} receptors and acts as an agonist of the serotonin 5-HT_{2A} receptor.

== Chemistry ==
Isoproscaline is in a class of compounds commonly known as phenethylamines, and the full chemical name is 2-(4-isopropoxy-3,5-dimethoxyphenyl)ethanamine.

=== Synthesis ===
The chemical synthesis of isoproscaline has been described.

=== Analogues ===
Analogues of isoproscaline include mescaline, escaline, proscaline, allylescaline, and methallylescaline, among others.

== Society and culture ==
=== Legal status ===
==== Canada ====
Isoproscaline is not a controlled substance in Canada as of 2025.

==== United Kingdom ====
In the UK, its highly likely that this compound would be covered by the "phenylethylamine amendment" to the misuse of drugs act likely rendering it a Class A controlled drug.

==== United States ====
Isoproscaline is unscheduled in the United States; however, because of its close similarity in structure and effects to mescaline, possession and sale of isoproscaline may be subject to prosecution under the Federal Analog Act.

== See also ==
- Scaline
