= 4-Thioisomescaline =

Clinical data
- Other names: 4-TIM; 2,3-Dimethoxy-4-methylthiophenethylamine; 4-Methylthio-2,3-dimethoxyphenethylamine
- Routes of administration: Oral
- ATC code: None

Pharmacokinetic data
- Duration of action: Unknown

Identifiers
- IUPAC name: 2-(2,3-dimethoxy-4-methylsulfanylphenyl)ethanamine
- CAS Number: 78335-87-2
- PubChem CID: 44276763
- ChemSpider: 23124670
- UNII: JR3FA4T8CJ
- ChEMBL: ChEMBL27183

Chemical and physical data
- Formula: C_{11}H_{17}NO_{2}S
- Molar mass: 227.32 g·mol^{−1}
- 3D model (JSmol): Interactive image
- SMILES: COC1=C(C=CC(=C1OC)SC)CCN
- InChI: InChI=1S/C11H17NO2S/c1-13-10-8(6-7-12)4-5-9(15-3)11(10)14-2/h4-5H,6-7,12H2,1-3H3; Key:RLGNNNSZZAWLAY-UHFFFAOYSA-N

4-Thioisomescaline (4-TIM), also known as 2,3-dimethoxy-4-methylthiophenethylamine, is a chemical compound of the phenethylamine and scaline families related to mescaline. It is the analogue of isomescaline in which the methoxy group at the 4 position has been replaced with a methylthio group. The compound is one of two possible thioisomescaline (TIM) positional isomers, the others being 3-thioisomescaline (3-TIM) and 4-thioisomescaline (4-TIM).

In his book PiHKAL (Phenethylamines I Have Known and Loved) and other publications, Alexander Shulgin lists 4-TIM's dose as greater than 160 or 240 mg orally and its duration as unknown. The compound was completely inactive at tested doses. Shulgin concluded that 4-TIM is inactive.

The chemical synthesis of 4-TIM has been described.

4-TIM was first described in the scientific literature by Shulgin and Peyton Jacob III in 1981. Subsequently, it was described in greater detail by Shulgin in PiHKAL in 1991.

== See also ==
- Scaline
- 2-Thioisomescaline
- 3-Thioisomescaline
