= Mescaloxylic acid =

Clinical data
- Other names: N-Carboxymethylmescaline; N-Carboxymethyl-3,4,5-trimethoxyphenethylamine; N-[2-(3,4,5-Trimethoxyphenyl)ethyl]glycine
- ATC code: None

Identifiers
- IUPAC name: 2-[2-(3,4,5-trimethoxyphenyl)ethylamino]acetic acid
- CAS Number: 7738-40-1
- PubChem CID: 57478618
- ChemSpider: 74204288

Chemical and physical data
- Formula: C_{13}H_{19}NO_{5}
- Molar mass: 269.297 g·mol^{−1}
- 3D model (JSmol): Interactive image
- SMILES: COC1=CC(=CC(=C1OC)OC)CCNCC(=O)O
- InChI: InChI=1S/C13H19NO5/c1-17-10-6-9(4-5-14-8-12(15)16)7-11(18-2)13(10)19-3/h6-7,14H,4-5,8H2,1-3H3,(H,15,16); Key:OUKOSEIHBSLNGJ-UHFFFAOYSA-N

Mescaloxylic acid, also known as N-carboxymethylmescaline or as N-carboxymethyl-3,4,5-trimethoxyphenethylamine, is an alkaloid of the phenethylamine and scaline families related to the psychedelic drug mescaline. It is the N-carboxymethyl derivative of mescaline. The alkaloid has been reported to be a trace constituent of peyote (Lophophora williamsii), though findings appear conflicting. It was first described in the scientific literature by 1972.

== See also ==
- Scaline § N-Substituted
- Mescaloruvic acid
