= Thioisomescaline =

Thioisomescaline (TIM) may refer to the following:

- 2-Thioisomescaline (2-TIM)
- 3-Thioisomescaline (3-TIM)
- 4-Thioisomescaline (4-TIM)

== See also ==
- Scaline
- Thiomescaline
