= 2-Thioisomescaline =

Clinical data
- Other names: 2-TIM; 2-Methylthio-3,4-dimethoxyphenethylamine; 3,4-Dimethoxy-2-methylthiophenethylamine
- Routes of administration: Oral
- Drug class: Psychoactive drug
- ATC code: None

Pharmacokinetic data
- Duration of action: Unknown

Identifiers
- IUPAC name: 2-(3,4-dimethoxy-2-methylsulfanylphenyl)ethanamine
- CAS Number: 75510-74-6
- PubChem CID: 20337296
- ChemSpider: 15283967
- UNII: L9542D99QQ
- ChEMBL: ChEMBL281325

Chemical and physical data
- Formula: C_{11}H_{17}NO_{2}S
- Molar mass: 227.32 g·mol^{−1}
- 3D model (JSmol): Interactive image
- SMILES: COC1=C(C(=C(C=C1)CCN)SC)OC
- InChI: InChI=1S/C11H17NO2S/c1-13-9-5-4-8(6-7-12)11(15-3)10(9)14-2/h4-5H,6-7,12H2,1-3H3; Key:NJNFCDQQEIAOIF-UHFFFAOYSA-N

2-Thioisomescaline (2-TIM), also known as 2-methylthio-3,4-dimethoxyphenethylamine, is a chemical compound of the phenethylamine and scaline families related to mescaline. It is the analogue of isomescaline in which the methoxy group at the 2 position has been replaced with a methylthio group. The compound is one of two possible thioisomescaline (TIM) positional isomers, the others being 3-thioisomescaline (3-TIM) and 4-thioisomescaline (4-TIM).

In his book PiHKAL (Phenethylamines I Have Known and Loved) and other publications, Alexander Shulgin lists 2-TIM's dose as greater than 240 mg orally and its duration as unknown. At a dose of 160 mg orally, there was some brief possible awareness. In addition, a small amount of alcohol later that day was quite intoxicating. On the other hand, there were no effects whatsoever at a higher dose of 240 mg orally. Shulgin concluded that 2-TIM is inactive.

The chemical synthesis of 2-TIM has been described.

2-TIM was first described in the scientific literature by Shulgin and Peyton Jacob III in 1981. Subsequently, it was described in greater detail by Shulgin in PiHKAL in 1991.

== See also ==
- Scaline
- 3-Thioisomescaline
- 4-Thioisomescaline
