= Mescaloruvic acid =

Clinical data
- Other names: N-(1-Carboxyethyl)mescaline; N-(1-Carboxyethyl)-3,4,5-trimethoxyphenethylamine; N-[2-(3,4,5-Trimethoxyphenyl)ethyl]alanine
- ATC code: None

Identifiers
- IUPAC name: 2-[2-(3,4,5-trimethoxyphenyl)ethylamino]propanoic acid
- CAS Number: 7738-43-4
- PubChem CID: 57478619

Chemical and physical data
- Formula: C_{14}H_{21}NO_{5}
- Molar mass: 283.324 g·mol^{−1}
- 3D model (JSmol): Interactive image
- SMILES: CC(C(=O)O)NCCC1=CC(=C(C(=C1)OC)OC)OC
- InChI: InChI=1S/C14H21NO5/c1-9(14(16)17)15-6-5-10-7-11(18-2)13(20-4)12(8-10)19-3/h7-9,15H,5-6H2,1-4H3,(H,16,17); Key:FNJLIRQMUUTSGR-UHFFFAOYSA-N

Mescaloruvic acid, also known as N-(1-carboxyethyl)mescaline or as N-(1-carboxyethyl)-3,4,5-trimethoxyphenethylamine, is an alkaloid of the phenethylamine and scaline families related to the psychedelic drug mescaline. It is the N-(1-carboxyethyl) derivative of mescaline. The alkaloid has been reported to be a trace constituent of peyote (Lophophora williamsii), though findings appear conflicting. It was first described in the scientific literature by 1972.

== See also ==
- Scaline § N-Substituted
- Mescaloxylic acid
