= 3-Methoxy-4-ethoxyphenethylamine =

MEPEA

Clinical data
- Other names: MEPEA; 3-Desmethoxyescaline
- Routes of administration: Oral
- Drug class: Psychoactive drug; "Mood elevator"
- ATC code: None

Pharmacokinetic data
- Onset of action: ≤1 hour
- Duration of action: "Short"

Identifiers
- IUPAC name: 2-(4-ethoxy-3-methoxyphenyl)ethan-1-amine
- CAS Number: 36377-59-0
- PubChem CID: 142076
- ChemSpider: 125332
- UNII: P4MS942R6J
- CompTox Dashboard (EPA): DTXSID40189904
- ECHA InfoCard: 100.199.597

Chemical and physical data
- Formula: C_{11}H_{17}NO_{2}
- Molar mass: 195.262 g·mol^{−1}
- 3D model (JSmol): Interactive image
- SMILES: COc1cc(ccc1OCC)CCN
- InChI: InChI=1S/C11H17NO2/c1-3-14-10-5-4-9(6-7-12)8-11(10)13-2/h4-5,8H,3,6-7,12H2,1-2H3; Key:AFMUTJRFLRYILG-UHFFFAOYSA-N

MEPEA, also known as 3-methoxy-4-ethoxyphenethylamine or as 3-desmethoxyescaline, is a psychoactive drug of the phenethylamine family related to the psychedelic drug mescaline. It is the analogue of escaline in which the methoxy group at the 5 position has been removed.

== Use and effects ==
In his book PiHKAL (Phenethylamines I Have Known and Loved) and other publications, Alexander Shulgin lists MEPEA's dose as 300 mg or more orally and its duration as "short". An earlier author listed its dose as 100 to 300 mg orally.

The effects of MEPEA have been reported to include very slight lightness, no body awareness, gentle lifting of spirits or mood enhancement, and no psychedelic effects, sensory enhancement, or other related changes. Its effects were described as "very quiet, very pleasant, and very light", with it producing a "plus-one" rating on the Shulgin Rating Scale in one report. In other publications, Shulgin said that MEPEA has little if any activity. The drug is one of the only known phenethylamines with only two substituents on the phenyl ring to show even a hint of central activity.

== Chemistry ==
=== Synthesis ===
The chemical synthesis of MEPEA has been described.

=== Analogues ===
A couple of closely related compounds include 3-methoxy-4-allyloxyphenethylamine (MAPEA; 3-desmethoxyallylescaline) and 3-methoxy-4-propoxyamphetamine (POMA; 3-desmethoxyproscaline).

== History ==
MEPEA was first described in the scientific literature by Otakar Leminger in 1972. Subsequently, it was described in greater detail by Shulgin in PiHKAL in 1991 as well as in later publications.

== See also ==
- Substituted methoxyphenethylamine
- Scaline § Related compounds
- 3-Methoxy-4-allyloxyphenethylamine (MAPEA; 3-desmethoxyallylescaline)
- 3,4-Dimethoxyphenethylamine (DMPEA; 3-desmethoxymescaline)
- 3-Methoxy-4-methylamphetamine (MMA)
