= Moprolol =

Names
- IUPAC name 1-(2-Methoxyphenoxy)-3-(propan-2-ylamino)propan-2-ol
- Other names (±)-Moprolol

Identifiers
CAS Number	5741-22-0
3D model (JSmol)	Interactive image
ChemSpider	64348
ECHA InfoCard	100.024.777
EC Number	248-195-3
MeSH	C009976
PubChem CID	71213
UNII	A94HCH4225
CompTox Dashboard (EPA)	DTXSID00863612
- InChI: InChI=1S/C13H21NO3/c1-10(2)14-8-11(15)9-17-13-7-5-4-6-12(13)16-3/h4-7,10-11,14-15H,8-9H2,1-3H3 Key: LFTFGCDECFPSQD-UHFFFAOYSA-N; InChI=1/C13H21NO3/c1-10(2)14-8-11(15)9-17-13-7-5-4-6-12(13)16-3/h4-7,10-11,14-15H,8-9H2,1-3H3 Key: LFTFGCDECFPSQD-UHFFFAOYAX
- SMILES: CC(C)NCC(COC1=CC=CC=C1OC)O

Properties
Chemical formula	C_{13}H_{21}NO_{3}
Molar mass	239.315 g·mol^{−1}
- Except where otherwise noted, data are given for materials in their standard state (at 25 °C [77 °F], 100 kPa). Infobox references

Moprolol is a beta-adrenergic antagonist, or beta blocker. It is typically prescribed to treat hypertension, high blood pressure, angina pectoris, arrhythmias, anxiety, and glaucoma.

Moprolol is currently off the market, most likely due to the manufacturer being in violation of US good manufacturing practices.

== See also ==
- Levomoprolol, the (S)-enantiomer of moprolol
