= Levomoprolol =

Names
- Preferred IUPAC name (2S)-1-(2-Methoxyphenoxy)-3-[(propan-2-yl)amino]propan-2-ol
- Other names (−)-Moprolol; l-Moprolol

Identifiers
| CAS Number | 77164-20-6 |
| 3D model (JSmol) | Interactive image |
| ChemSpider | 2298561 |
| PubChem CID | 3034006 |
| UNII | K4NON6FSON |
| CompTox Dashboard (EPA) | DTXSID301016500 |
- InChI: InChI=1S/C13H21NO3/c1-10(2)14-8-11(15)9-17-13-7-5-4-6-12(13)16-3/h4-7,10-11,14-15H,8-9H2,1-3H3/t11-/m0/s1 Key: LFTFGCDECFPSQD-NSHDSACASA-N; InChI=1/C13H21NO3/c1-10(2)14-8-11(15)9-17-13-7-5-4-6-12(13)16-3/h4-7,10-11,14-15H,8-9H2,1-3H3/t11-/m0/s1 Key: LFTFGCDECFPSQD-NSHDSACABP
- SMILES: CC(C)NC[C@@H](COC1=CC=CC=C1OC)O

Properties
| Chemical formula | C_{13}H_{21}NO_{3} |
| Molar mass | 239.315 g·mol^{−1} |
- Except where otherwise noted, data are given for materials in their standard state (at 25 °C [77 °F], 100 kPa). Infobox references

Levomoprolol is a beta adrenergic antagonist. It is the (S)-enantiomer of moprolol.
