= Cryptic shock =

Pre-shock is also known as compensated shock, or cryptic shock describes the state in which the human body is still capable of offsetting the abnormally reduced tissue perfusion by exerting compensatory mechanism.

For instance, in a solely hypovolemia without formally entering shock state, the body is able to constrict peripheral vessels, accelerate heart rate, and boost myocardial contractility to compensate for the negative impacts out of a certain percentage reduction in total effective arterial blood volume. Thus, the person, particularly for those non-elderly who have higher physical reserve, might not be symptomatic of such blood loss accounted for certain amount of total blood volume in the body and might even manifest a normal systolic pressure as well as diastolic pressure. Taken together, tachycardia, a modest change in overall blood pressure in either trend—increase or decrease—or hyperlactatemia that is not deemed to be moderate to severe, are the likely only early signs of clinical shock.

Clinical shock a.k.a. uncompensated shock is termed overt shock.
