= Symbescaline =

Clinical data
- Other names: SB; 3,5-Diethoxy-4-methoxyphenethylamine
- Routes of administration: Oral
- ATC code: None

Pharmacokinetic data
- Duration of action: Unknown

Identifiers
- IUPAC name: 2-(3,5-diethoxy-4-methoxyphenyl)ethan-1-amine
- CAS Number: 90109-61-8
- PubChem CID: 44374890
- ChemSpider: 21106384
- UNII: UP8DY84WAK
- ChEMBL: ChEMBL159684
- CompTox Dashboard (EPA): DTXSID10658551

Chemical and physical data
- Formula: C_{13}H_{21}NO_{3}
- Molar mass: 239.315 g·mol^{−1}
- 3D model (JSmol): Interactive image
- SMILES: COc1c(cc(cc1OCC)CCN)OCC
- InChI: InChI=1S/C13H21NO3/c1-4-16-11-8-10(6-7-14)9-12(17-5-2)13(11)15-3/h8-9H,4-7,14H2,1-3H3; Key:ROKMKYBLAPLLER-UHFFFAOYSA-N

Symbescaline (SB), also known as 3,5-diethoxy-4-methoxyphenethylamine, is a psychoactive drug of the phenethylamine and scaline families related to mescaline. It is the analogue of mescaline in which the methoxy groups at the 3 and 5 positions have been replaced with ethoxy groups. In addition, symbescaline is a positional isomer of asymbescaline.

In his book PiHKAL (Phenethylamines I Have Known and Loved) and other publications, Alexander Shulgin lists symbescaline's dose as above 240 mg orally and its duration as unknown. The effects of symbescaline have been reported to include no effects, a vague threshold, a slight chill, and strange and disrupted sleep. It is said to have a very unpleasant taste. Shulgin concluded that symbescaline is "probably not active".

The chemical synthesis of symbescaline has been described.

Symbescaline was first described in the scientific literature by Alexander Shulgin and Peyton Jacob III in 1984. Subsequently, it was described in greater detail by Shulgin in PiHKAL in 1991.

== See also ==
- Scaline
- TWEETIO § Scalines
- Thiosymbescaline
