= Cycloproscaline =

Clinical data
- Other names: CP; 4-Cyclopropoxy-3,5-dimethoxyphenethylamine; 4-cPrO-3,5-DMPEA
- Routes of administration: Oral
- Drug class: Serotonin receptor modulator; Serotonin 5-HT_{2A} receptor agonist; Serotonergic psychedelic; Hallucinogen
- ATC code: None

Pharmacokinetic data
- Duration of action: ≥6 hours

Identifiers
- IUPAC name: 2-(4-cyclopropyloxy-3,5-dimethoxyphenyl)ethanamine
- CAS Number: 2375260-81-2
- PubChem CID: 145874427
- ChemSpider: 77003461

Chemical and physical data
- Formula: C_{13}H_{19}NO_{3}
- Molar mass: 237.299 g·mol^{−1}
- 3D model (JSmol): Interactive image
- SMILES: COC1=CC(=CC(=C1OC2CC2)OC)CCN
- InChI: InChI=1S/C13H19NO3/c1-15-11-7-9(5-6-14)8-12(16-2)13(11)17-10-3-4-10/h7-8,10H,3-6,14H2,1-2H3; Key:VRTSLAVKWTZKIT-UHFFFAOYSA-N

Cycloproscaline (CP), also known as 4-cyclopropoxy-3,5-dimethoxyphenethylamine (4-cPrO-3,5-DMPEA), is a psychedelic drug of the phenethylamine and scaline families related to mescaline. It is the homologue of mescaline in which the 4-methoxy group has been replaced with a 4-cyclopropoxy group. The drug has a dose of 60 mg or more orally and a duration of 6 hours or more, but has not been fully evaluated. It is a low-potency full agonist of the serotonin 5-HT_{2A} receptor and also interacts with other serotonin receptors such as the serotonin 5-HT_{1A} and 5-HT_{2C} receptors. The drug's chemical synthesis has been described. Cycloproscaline was first described in the scientific literature by Daniel Trachsel and colleagues in 2013. Its pharmacology was studied in greater detail in 2021. The drug is not a controlled substance in Canada as of 2025.

== See also ==
- Scaline
- Cyclopropylmescaline
