= Cold feet =

Apprehension or doubt preventing planned action

Cold feet is a phrase that refers to a person not going through with an action, particularly one which requires long-term commitment, due to fear, uncertainty, and doubt. A person is said to be "getting cold feet" when, after previously committing to a plan, they ultimately do not carry out the planned course of action.

== Definitions (psychological) ==
- Apprehension or doubt strong enough to prevent a planned course of action.
- A loss or lack of courage or confidence; an onset of uncertainty or fear.
- Timidity that prevents the continuation of a course of action.

== Etymology ==
The origin of the term itself has been largely attributed to American author Stephen Crane, who added the phrase, in 1896, to the second edition of his short novel Maggie: A Girl of the Streets. Crane writes, "I knew this was the way it would be. They got cold feet." The term is present in "Seed Time and Harvest" by Fritz Reuter, published in 1862. Kenneth McKenzie, a former professor of Italian at Princeton University attributed the first use of the phrase to the play Volpone, produced by Ben Jonson in 1605. The true origin and first usage of the phrase remains debated and unconfirmed as exemplified above.

== Common uses ==
=== Marriage ===
A common use of the phrase is when people fear the commitment of marriage and get "cold feet" before a wedding ceremony. This premarital doubt or fear may manifest for a variety of reasons and sometimes cause the bride or groom to back out of a planned marriage. Original research on the "cold feet" phenomenon is very limited, but a four-year study conducted by UCLA researchers found feelings of premarital doubt or uncertainty about an impending marriage were associated with future marital problems and a viable predictor of divorce.
