= Methallylescaline =

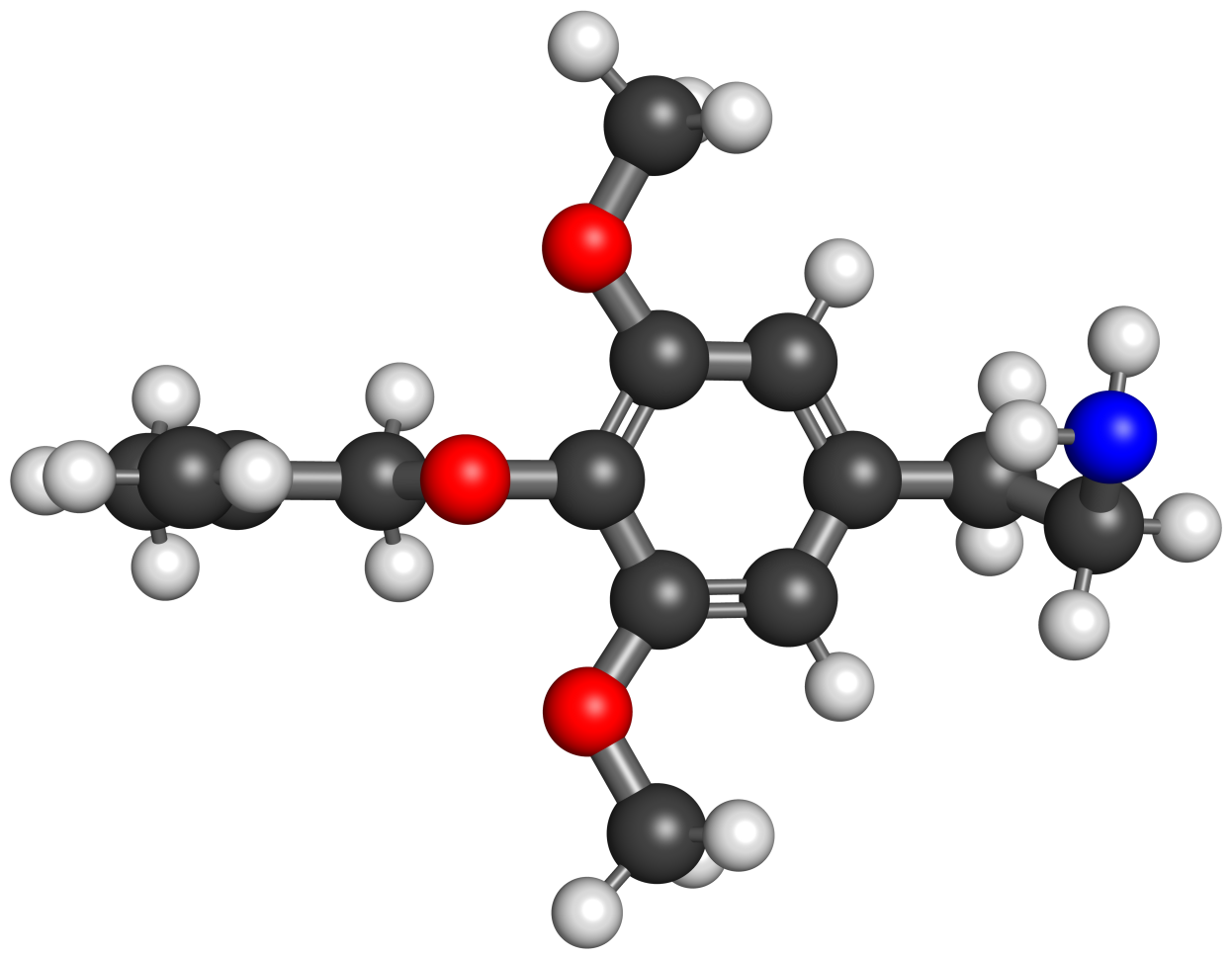

Clinical data
- Other names: MAL; 4-Methylallyloxy-3,5-dimethoxyphenethylamine; 3,5-Dimethoxy-4-methylallyloxyphenethylamine; 4-Methylallyl-desmethylmescaline; MAD
- Routes of administration: Oral
- Drug class: Serotonin receptor modulator; Serotonin 5-HT_{2A} receptor agonist; Serotonergic psychedelic; Hallucinogen
- ATC code: None

Legal status
- Legal status: BR: Class F2 (Prohibited psychotropics)

Pharmacokinetic data
- Onset of action: ≤1 hour
- Duration of action: 12–16 hours

Identifiers
- IUPAC name: 2-{3,5-Dimethoxy-4-[(2-methylprop-2-en-1-yl)oxy]phenyl}ethan-1-amine
- CAS Number: 207740-41-8
- PubChem CID: 44350127
- ChemSpider: 21106346
- UNII: CVN0S9V910
- ChEMBL: ChEMBL126803
- CompTox Dashboard (EPA): DTXSID20658380

Chemical and physical data
- Formula: C_{14}H_{21}NO_{3}
- Molar mass: 251.326 g·mol^{−1}
- 3D model (JSmol): Interactive image
- SMILES: CC(=C)COc1c(cc(cc1OC)CCN)OC
- InChI: InChI=1S/C14H21NO3/c1-10(2)9-18-14-12(16-3)7-11(5-6-15)8-13(14)17-4/h7-8H,1,5-6,9,15H2,2-4H3; Key:FOXJFBFFGULACD-UHFFFAOYSA-N

Methallylescaline (MAL), also known as 4-methylallyloxy-3,5-dimethoxyphenethylamine, is a psychedelic drug of the phenethylamine and scaline families related to mescaline. It is taken orally.

The drug acts as a serotonin 5-HT_{2} receptor agonist, including of the serotonin 5-HT_{2A} receptor. It is closely structurally related to mescaline and to other scalines like escaline and allylescaline.

Methallylescaline was first described by Alexander Shulgin in his 1991 book PiHKAL (Phenethylamines I Have Known and Loved). It was encountered as a novel designer drug by 2013.

== Use and effects ==
In his book PiHKAL (Phenethylamines I Have Known and Loved), Alexander Shulgin lists the dose range of methallylescaline as 40 to 65 mg and its duration as 12 to 16 hours. As such, its dose range is relatively narrow. Moreover, the drug has been reported to have an unusually steep dose–response curve, such that a small increase in dose can result in an unexpectedly large increase in effects. Methallylescaline has about 6 times the potency of mescaline, which has a much higher listed dose range of 200 to 400 mg. Its onset is within 1 hour and peak effects occur within 2 hours.

Shulgin has described methallylescaline as a "mixed bag" in terms of experience reports. Its effects have been reported to include closed-eye visuals or mental imagery, "visual theater", open-eye visuals, visual distortions, visual depth and movement effects, kaleidoscopic neon colors, watercolors, fantasy, feelings of unreality, easy childhood memory recall, self-connectedness, eroticism, initial discomfort, overload, feeling overwhelmed, shades of possible amnesia, loss of contact, extreme restlessness, trouble sleeping, and enhanced dreams. It was also reported to produce quite strong body effects, diuretic effects, and slightly reduced heart rate. Some found it unpleasant and said that they would not repeat the experience, whereas others were impressed by it, found it enjoyable, and called it "beautiful". Many expressed that the dose they tried was too strong for them and that a lower dose would be better. Methallylescaline has been described as having relatively more visual imagery than other scalines like cyclopropylmescaline and allylescaline.

Others have noted that methallylescaline has strong visual effects, as well as prominent nausea, vomiting, and body load, including feeling "overstimulated. The drug is frequently compared to mescaline.

== Pharmacology ==
=== Pharmacodynamics ===
Methallylescaline activities
Target	Affinity (K_{i}, nM)
5-HT_{1A}	5,100–>10,000 (K_{i}); 12–389 (EC_{50}); 27–28% (E_{max})
5-HT_{1B}	>10,000 (K_{i}); 96–209 (EC_{50}); 68–87% (E_{max})
5-HT_{1D}	2,754 (K_{i}); 724–1,150 (EC_{50}); 63–75% (E_{max})
5-HT_{1E}	>10,000 (K_{i}); 1,550–4,680 (EC_{50}); 64–103% (E_{max})
5-HT_{1F}	ND (K_{i}); 1,510–2,570 (EC_{50}); 46–92% (E_{max})
5-HT_{2A}	72–955 (K_{i}); 8.5–891 (EC_{50}); 19–110% (E_{max})
5-HT_{2B}	110 (K_{i}); 4.9–>10,000 (EC_{50}); 32–103% (E_{max})
5-HT_{2C}	5.1–520 (K_{i}); 1.8–331 (EC_{50}); 75–102% (E_{max})
5-HT_{3}	>10,000
5-HT_{4}	ND
5-HT_{5A}	>10,000 (K_{i}); 219 (EC_{50}); 21% (E_{max})
5-HT_{6}	>10,000
5-HT_{7}	>10,000
α_{1A}–α_{1D}	>10,000
α_{2A}	550–1,500
α_{2B}, α_{2C}	>10,000
β_{1}–β_{3}	>10,000
D_{1}, D_{2}	>10,000
D_{3}	>10,000 (K_{i}); 2,450 (EC_{50}); 86% (E_{max})
D_{4}, D_{5}	>10,000
H_{1}–H_{4}	>10,000
M_{1}–M_{5}	>10,000
TAAR_{1}	1,000 (K_{i}) (rat); 3,900 (K_{i}) (mouse) (EC_{50}) (rodent) >10,000 (EC_{50}) (human)
I_{1}	ND
σ_{1}	>10,000
σ_{2}	5,248
SERT	>10,000 (K_{i}); ND (IC_{50})
NET	>10,000 (K_{i}); ND (IC_{50})
DAT	>10,000 (K_{i}); ND (IC_{50})
Notes: The smaller the value, the more avidly the drug binds to the site. All proteins are human unless otherwise specified. Refs:

Methallylescaline acts as a potent agonist of the serotonin 5-HT_{2A}, 5-HT_{2B}, and 5-HT_{2C} receptors, among other actions. It was inactive serotonin 5-HT_{2B} receptor agonist in one study, but was a potent agonist in another study. The drug is also a potent agonist of the serotonin 5-HT_{1} receptors and of the serotonin 5-HT_{5A} receptor, as well as an agonist of the dopamine D_{3} receptor. The comprehensive receptor interactions of methallylescaline have been studied.

The drug produces the head-twitch response (HTR), a behavioral proxy of psychedelic effects, in rodents. Surprisingly, the HTR induced by methallylescaline was blocked by the selective serotonin 5-HT_{2C} receptor antagonist SB-242084 but not by the serotonin 5-HT_{2A} receptor antagonist ketanserin.

In addition to its psychedelic-like effects, methallylescaline produces hyperlocomotion (a stimulant-like effect), conditioned place preference (CPP; a rewarding effect), and modest self-administration (a reinforcing effect) in rodents, among other effects.

Methallylescaline, along with BOD and DOI, has been reported to produce serotonergic neurotoxicity in rodents at high doses given repeatedly. Other psychedelics have also been found to produce neurotoxicity in preclinical research.

=== Pharmacokinetics ===
The metabolism of methallylescaline has been studied.

== Chemistry ==
Methallylescaline, also known as 4-methylallyloxy-3,5-dimethoxyphenethylamine, is a substituted phenethylamine and scaline. It is a synthetic derivative of mescaline (3,4,5-trimethoxyphenethylamine) with a methallyloxy group instead of methoxy group at the 4 position.

=== Synthesis ===
The chemical synthesis of methallylescaline has been described.

=== Analogues ===
Analogues of methallylescaline include mescaline, escaline, allylescaline, propynyl, and cyclopropylmescaline, among others. Some other analogues include 3C-MAL, 2C-T-3, 2C-O-3, and MMALM.

== History ==
Methallylescaline was first described in the literature by Alexander Shulgin in his 1991 book PiHKAL (Phenethylamines I Have Known and Loved). It was first tried by Shulgin in 1981 and its hallucinogenic effects were discovered by him in 1982. The drug has an entry in PiHKAL, but not in Shulgin's 2011 book The Shulgin Index, Volume One: Psychedelic Phenethylamines and Related Compounds. It was encountered as a novel designer drug in Europe by 2013. Methallylescaline's pharmacology was described by Matthias Liechti and Daniel Trachsel and colleagues in 2021. Discussion of methallylescaline online began increasing in late 2023.

== Society and culture ==
=== Names ===
Alexander Shulgin described the name of methallylescaline (MAL) as "completely unsound". This was because there was no union of a methallyl group with escaline. Instead, methallylescaline is mescaline with a 2-propene group attached to the methyl of the methoxy group at the 4 position. However, Shulgin expressed that there is no way of naming the compound in that manner. The only corresponding proper name would be 4-methylallyldesmethylmescaline (MAD). But Shulgin found the acronym MAD to be disagreeable and ultimately preferred MAL.

=== Legal status ===
==== Canada ====
Methallylescaline is not a controlled substance in Canada as of 2025.

==== Sweden ====
Methallylescaline is illegal in Sweden as of 26 January 2016.

==== United States ====
Methallylescaline is not explicitly scheduled under the Controlled Substances Act. However, due to its structural similarities with mescaline, it could potentially be prosecuted under the Federal Analogue Act if sold for human consumption.

== See also ==
- Scaline
