= Trisescaline =

Clinical data
- Other names: TRIS; Trescaline; 3,4,5-Triethoxyphenethylamine
- Routes of administration: Oral
- ATC code: None

Pharmacokinetic data
- Duration of action: Unknown

Identifiers
- IUPAC name: 2-(3,4,5-triethoxyphenyl)ethan-1-amine
- CAS Number: 90109-63-0
- PubChem CID: 44375115
- ChemSpider: 21106399
- UNII: CY38QQ97L2
- ChEMBL: ChEMBL355146
- CompTox Dashboard (EPA): DTXSID70658557

Chemical and physical data
- Formula: C_{14}H_{23}NO_{3}
- Molar mass: 253.342 g·mol^{−1}
- 3D model (JSmol): Interactive image
- SMILES: CCOc1c(cc(cc1OCC)CCN)OCC
- InChI: InChI=1S/C14H23NO3/c1-4-16-12-9-11(7-8-15)10-13(17-5-2)14(12)18-6-3/h9-10H,4-8,15H2,1-3H3; Key:ZIZQSXJSBRQJEB-UHFFFAOYSA-N

Trisescaline (TRIS), also known as trescaline or as 3,4,5-triethoxyphenethylamine, is a chemical compound of the phenethylamine and scaline families related to mescaline. It is the derivative of mescaline in which the three methoxy groups on the phenyl ring have been replaced with ethoxy groups.

In his book PiHKAL (Phenethylamines I Have Known and Loved) and other publications, Alexander Shulgin lists trisescaline's dose as greater than 240 mg orally and its duration as unknown. The drug produced no effects at tested doses of up to 240 mg orally.

Trisescaline produced no psychedelic-like behavioral effects in cats even at very high doses.

The chemical synthesis of trisescaline has been described.

Trisescaline was first described in the scientific literature by Shulgin and Peyton Jacob III in 1984. Subsequently, it was described in greater detail by Shulgin in PiHKAL in 1991.

== See also ==
- Scaline
- TWEETIO § Scalines
- Thiotrisescaline
