= Scaline =

Class of chemical compounds

Mescaline, the most well-known scaline psychedelic.

A scaline, also known as a substituted mescaline analogue and typically but not always a 4-substituted 3,5-dimethoxyphenethylamine, is an analogue of the phenethylamine serotonergic psychedelic mescaline (3,4,5-trimethoxyphenethylamine).

Other related compounds include the 2C (4-substituted 2,5-dimethoxyphenethylamine) and DOx (4-substituted 2,5-dimethoxyamphetamine) compounds as well as 3,4,5-trimethoxyamphetamine (TMA) and other 4-substituted 3,5-dimethoxyamphetamines (3C drugs). They are also mescaline analogues, but the 2C and DOx drugs have a methoxy group at the 2 position instead of the 3 position of the phenyl ring, while TMA is an amphetamine rather than a phenethylamine.

The pharmacology of mescaline analogues has been studied. Mescaline analogues, or 4-substituted 3,5-dimethoxyphenethylamines specifically, tend to be much less potent than the 2C and DOx drugs. This relates to the fact that the 2,4,5-substitution pattern tends to be optimal in terms of receptor affinity and potency. However, mescaline analogues are frequently much more potent than mescaline.

Substituted mescaline analogues have been extensively characterized by Alexander Shulgin and described in his books such as PiHKAL (Phenethylamines I Have Known and Loved) and The Shulgin Index, Volume One: Psychedelic Phenethylamines and Related Compounds as well as in his literature reviews. They have also been studied by David E. Nichols and Daniel Trachsel, among other researchers.

A closely related group is thioscalines, which are compounds in which one or more of the methoxy groups of mescaline are replaced with alkylthio groups.

== Use and effects ==
Doses and durations of scalines
Compound	Chemical name	Dose	Duration
α,α-Dideuteromescaline (α-D)	3,4,5-Trimethoxy-α,α-dideuterophenethylamine	230 mg	Unknown
α,β-Dideuteromescaline (α,β-D)	3,4,5-Trimethoxy-α,β-dideuterophenethylamine	250 mg	Unknown
β,β-Dideuteromescaline (β-D)	3,4,5-Trimethoxy-β,β-dideuterophenethylamine	200–400 mg	12 hours
4-Desoxymescaline (DESOXY)	4-Methyl-3,5-dimethoxyphenethylamine	40–120 mg	6–8 hours
4-O-Desmethylmescaline (DESMETHYL)	4-Hydroxy-3,5-dimethoxyphenethylamine	Unknown	Unknown
4-Trideuteromescaline (4-D)	4-Trideuteromethoxy-3,5-dimethoxyphenethylamine	200–400 mg	12 hours
Allylescaline (AL)	4-Allyloxy-3,5-dimethoxyphenethylamine	20–35 mg	8–12 hours
Asymbescaline (ASB)	3,4-Diethoxy-5-methoxyphenethylamine	200–280 mg	10–15 hours
Benzscaline (BZ)	4-Benzyloxy-3,5-dimethoxyphenethylamine	Unknown	Unknown
Biscaline (BI)	4-Phenyl-3,5-dimethoxyphenethylamine	Unknown	Unknown
Buscaline (B)	4-Butoxy-3,5-dimethoxyphenethylamine	>150 mg	Several hours
Cyclopropylmescaline (CPM)	4-Cyclopropylmethoxy-3,5-dimethoxyphenethylamine	60–80 mg	12–18 hours
Cycloproscaline (CP)	4-Cyclopropoxy-3,5-dimethoxyphenethylamine	≥60 mg	≥6 hours
Difluoroescaline (DFE)	4-(2,2-Difluoroethoxy)-3,5-dimethoxyphenethylamine	40–80 mg	6–12 hours
Difluoroisoproscaline (DFIP)	4-(1,3-Difluoroisopropoxy)-3,5-dimethoxyphenethylamine	Unknown	Unknown
Difluoromescaline (DFM)	4-Difluoromethoxy-3,5-dimethoxyphenethylamine	50–100 mg	12–18 hours
Escaline (E)	4-Ethoxy-3,5-dimethoxyphenethylamine	40–60 mg	8–12 hours
Fluoroescaline (FE)	4-(2-Fluoroethoxy)-3,5-dimethoxyphenethylamine	≥75 mg	~6 hours
Fluoroisoproscaline (FIP)	4-(1-Fluoroisopropoxy)-3,5-dimethoxyphenethylamine	Unknown	Unknown
Fluoromescaline (FM)	4-Fluoromethoxy-3,5-dimethoxyphenethylamine	Unknown	Unknown
Fluoroproscaline (FP)	4-(3-Fluoropropoxy)-3,5-dimethoxyphenethylamine	60–150 mg	3–5 hours
Isobuscaline (IB)	4-Isobutoxy-3,5-dimethoxyphenethylamine	60–100 mg	10–14 hours
Isomescaline (IM)	2,3,4-Trimethoxyphenethylamine	>400 mg	Unknown
Isoproscaline (IP)	4-Isopropoxy-3,5-dimethoxyphenethylamine	40–80 mg	10–16 hours
Mescaline (M)	3,4,5-Trimethoxyphenethylamine	200–400 (50–800) mg	10–12 (6–14) hours
Metadifluoromescaline (MDFM)	3-(Difluoromethoxy)-4,5-dimethoxyphenylethylamine	≥85 mg	~8 hours
Metatrifluoromescaline (MTFM)	3,4-Dimethoxy-5-(trifluoromethoxy)phenethylamine	Unknown	Unknown
Metaescaline (ME)	3-Ethoxy-4,5-dimethoxyphenethylamine	200–350 mg	8–12 hours
Metaproscaline (MP)	3,4-Dimethoxy-5-propoxyphenethylamine	>240 mg	Unknown
Methallylescaline (MAL)	4-Methallyloxy-3,5-dimethoxyphenethylamine	40–65 mg	12–16 hours
Phenescaline (PE)	4-Phenethyloxy-3,5-dimethoxyphenethylamine	>150 mg	Unknown
Phescaline (PH)	4-Phenoxy-3,5-dimethoxyphenethylamine	Unknown	Unknown
Propynylscaline	4-Propynyloxy-3,5-dimethoxyphenethylamine	≥80 mg	8–12 hours
Proscaline (P)	4-Propoxy-3,5-dimethoxyphenethylamine	30–60 mg	8–12 hours
sec-Buscaline (SBU)	4-sec-Butoxy-3,5-dimethoxyphenethylamine	Unknown	Unknown
Symbescaline (SB)	4-Methoxy-3,5-diethoxyphenethylamine	>240 mg	Unknown
tert-Buscaline (TBU)	4-tert-Butoxy-3,5-dimethoxyphenethylamine	Unknown	Unknown
Trescaline (TRIS)	3,4,5-Triethoxyphenethylamine	>240 mg	Unknown
Trifluoroescaline (TFE)	4-(2,2,2-Trifluoroethoxy)-3,5-dimethoxyphenethylamine	35–65 mg	12–18 hours
Trifluoroisoproscaline (TFIP)	4-(1,1,1-Trifluoroisopropoxy)-3,5-dimethoxyphenethylamine	Unknown	Unknown
Trifluoromescaline (TFM)	4-(Trifluoromethoxy)-3,5-dimethoxyphenethylamine	15–40 mg	14–24 hours
Trifluoroproscaline (TFP)	4-(3,3,3-Trifluoropropoxy)-3,5-dimethoxyphenethylamine	≥60 mg	Unknown
Viscaline (V)	4-Vinyl-3,5-dimethoxyphenethylamine	Unknown	Unknown
Refs:

Doses and durations of thioscalines
Compound	Chemical name	Dose	Duration
3-Thioasymbescaline (3-TASB)	3-Ethylthio-4-ethoxy-5-methoxyphenethylamine	~160 mg	10–18 hours
4-Thioasymbescaline (4-TASB)	3-Ethoxy-4-ethylthio-5-methoxyphenethylamine	60–100 mg	10–15 hours
5-Thioasymbescaline (5-TASB)	3,4-Diethoxy-5-methylthiophenethylamine	~160 mg	~8 hours
4-Thiobuscaline (4-TB)	4-Butylthio-3,5-dimethoxyphenethylamine	60–120 mg	~8 hours
3-Thioescaline (3-TE)	3-Methylthio-4-ethoxy-5-methoxyphenethylamine	60–80 mg	8–12 hours
4-Thioescaline (4-TE)	4-Ethylthio-3,5-dimethoxyphenethylamine	20–30 mg	9–12 hours
2-Thioisomescaline (2-TIM)	2-Methylthio-3,4-dimethoxyphenethylamine	>240 mg	Unknown
3-Thioisomescaline (3-TIM)	3-Methylthio-2,4-dimethoxyphenethylamine	>240 mg	Unknown
4-Thioisomescaline (4-TIM)	4-Methylthio-2,3-dimethoxyphenethylamine	>240 mg	Unknown
3-Thiomescaline (3-TM)	3-Methylthio-4,5-dimethoxyphenethylamine	60–100 mg	8–12 hours
4-Thiomescaline (4-TM)	4-Methylthio-3,5-dimethoxyphenethylamine	20–40 mg	10–15 hours
3-Thiometaescaline (3-TME)	3-ethylthio-4,5-dimethoxyphenethylamine	60–100 mg	10–15 hours
4-Thiometaescaline (4-TME)	3-Ethoxy-4-methylthio-5-methoxyphenethylamine	60–100 mg	10–15 hours
5-Thiometaescaline (5-TME)	3-Ethoxy-4-methoxy-5-methylthiophenethylamine	>200 mg	Unknown
4-Thioproscaline (4-TP)	4-Propylthio-3,5-dimethoxyphenethylamine	20–25 mg	10–15 hours
3-Thiosymbescaline (3-TSB)	3-Ethoxy-5-ethylthio-4-methoxyphenethylamine	>200 mg	Unknown
4-Thiosymbescaline (4-TSB)	4-Methylthio-3,5-diethoxyphenethylamine	>240 mg	Unknown
3-Thiotrescaline (3-T-TRIS)	3-Ethylthio-4,5-Diethoxyphenethylamine	>160 mg	Unknown
4-Thiotrescaline (4-T-TRIS)	4-Ethylthio-3,5-diethoxyphenethylamine	>200 mg	Unknown
Refs:

== Pharmacology ==
=== Pharmacodynamics ===
Serotonin receptor affinities (K_{i}, nM) of selected scalines (Jain et al., 2025)
Compound	5-HT_{1A}	5-HT_{1B}	5-HT_{1D}	5-HT_{1E}	5-HT_{2A}	5-HT_{2B}	5-HT_{2C}	5-HT_{3}	5-HT_{5A}	5-HT_{6}	5-HT_{7}
Mescaline	–	–	794	–	1,950	398	–	–	–	–	–
Escaline	–	–	724	–	–	148	1,950	–	–	–	–
Isoproscaline	–	–	4,790	–	2,750	263	2,510	–	–	–	–
Cyclopropylmescaline	–	–	–	–	–	234	955	–	–	–	–
Allylescaline	–	–	–	490	2,450	245	1,320	–	–	–	–
Methallylescaline	–	–	2,750	–	955	110	324	–	–	–	–

== Society and culture ==
=== Legal status ===
==== Canada ====
Mescaline and 3,4,5-trimethoxyamphetamine (TMA) are the only scalines (and derivatives) that are controlled substances in Canada as of 2025.

== List of scalines ==
=== 4-Substituted ===
==== 4-Alkoxy-substituted ====
- 4-Methoxyescaline (4-MeO-E; MeOEtO) (3,5-dimethoxy-4-(2-methoxyethoxy)phenethylamine)
- Allylescaline (AL) (4-allyloxy-3,5-dimethoxyphenethylamine)
- Amylescaline (4-n-amyloxy-3,5-dimethoxyphenethylamine)
- Benzscaline (BZ) (4-benzyloxy-3,5-dimethoxyphenethylamine)
- Buscaline (B) (4-butoxy-3,5-dimethoxyphenethylamine)
- Cyclopropylmescaline (CPM) (4-cyclopropylmethoxy-3,5-dimethoxyphenethylamine)
- Cycloproscaline (CP) (4-cyclopropoxy-3,5-dimethoxyphenethylamine)
- Difluoroescaline (DFE) (multiple forms)
- Difluoroisoproscaline (DFIP) (multiple forms)
- Difluoromescaline (DFM) (4-difluoromethoxy-3,5-dimethoxyphenethylamine)
- Escaline (E) (4-ethoxy-3,5-dimethoxyphenethylamine)
- Fluoroescaline (FE) (multiple forms)
- Fluoromescaline (FM) (4-fluoromethoxy-3,5-dimethoxyphenethylamine)
- Fluoroproscaline (FP) (multiple forms)
- Hexylescaline (4-n-hexyloxy-3,5-dimethoxyphenethylamine)
- Isobuscaline (IB) (4-isobutoxy-3,5-dimethoxyphenethylamine)
- Isoproscaline (IP) (4-isopropoxy-3,5-dimethoxyphenethylamine)
- Methallylescaline (MAL) (4-methylallyloxy-3,5-dimethoxyphenethylamine)
- Phenescaline (4-phenylethoxy-3,5-dimethoxyphenethylamine)
- Phescaline (4-phenoxy-3,5-dimethoxyphenethylamine)
- Propynylscaline (4-propynyloxy-3,5-dimethoxyphenethylamine)
- Proscaline (P) (4-propoxy-3,5-dimethoxyphenethylamine)
- Septylescaline (4-n-heptyloxy-3,5-dimethoxyphenethylamine)
- Trifluoroescaline (TFE) (multiple forms)
- Trifluoromescaline (TFM) (4-trifluoromethoxy-3,5-dimethoxyphenethylamine)
- Trifluoroproscaline (TFP) (multiple forms)
- Viscaline (4-vinyl-3,5-dimethoxyphenethylamine)

==== 4-Alkylthio-substituted ====
- 4-Thiobuscaline (4-TB) (4-butylthio-3,5-dimethoxyphenethylamine)
- 4-Thioescaline (4-TE) (4-ethylthio-3,5-dimethoxyphenethylamine)
- 4-Thiomescaline (4-TM) (4-methylthio-3,5-dimethoxyphenethylamine)
- 4-Thioproscaline (4-TP) (4-propylthio-3,5-dimethoxyphenethylamine)

==== Others ====
- Biscaline (4-phenyl-3,5-dimethoxyphenethylamine)
- 4-Bromomescaline (4-Br-3,5-DMPEA) (4-bromo-3,5-dimethoxyphenethylamine)
- 4-Desmethylmescaline (desmethyl) (4-hydroxy-3,5-dimethoxyphenethylamine)
- 4-Desoxymescaline (desoxy) (4-methyl-3,5-dimethoxyphenethylamine)

=== 3- or 5-Extended ===
- Asymbescaline (ASB) (3,4-diethoxy-5-methoxyphenethylamine)
- Metadifluoromescaline (MDFM) (3,4-dimethoxy-5-difluoromethoxyphenethylamine)
- Metaescaline (ME) (3-ethoxy-4,5-dimethoxyphenethylamine)
- Metaproscaline (MP) (3,4-dimethoxy-5-propoxyphenethylamine)
- Symbescaline (SB) (4-methoxy-3,5-diethoxyphenethylamine)
- 4-Thioasymbescaline (4-TASB) (4-ethylthio-3-ethoxy-5-methoxyphenethylamine)
- 4-Thiometaescaline (4-TME) (4-methylthio-3-ethoxy-5-methoxyphenethylamine)
- 4-Thiosymbescaline (4-TSB) (4-methylthio-3,5-diethoxyphenethylamine)
- 4-Thiotrescaline (4-T-TRIS; 4-thiotrisescaline) (4-ethylthio-3,5-diethoxyphenethylamine)
- Trescaline (TRIS; trisescaline) (3,4,5-triethoxyphenethylamine)

=== 3- or 5-Replaced ===
- 3-Desmethylmescaline (3-DESMETHYL) (3,4-dimethoxy-5-hydroxyphenethylamine)
- 3-Thioasymbescaline (3-TASB) (3-ethylthio-4-ethoxy-5-methoxyphenethylamine)
- 5-Thioasymbescaline (5-TASB) (3,4-diethoxy-5-methylthiophenethylamine)
- 3-Thioescaline (3-TE) (3-methoxy-4-ethoxy-5-methylthiophenethylamine)
- 3-Thiomescaline (3-TM) (3,4-dimethoxy-5-methylthiophenethylamine)
- 3-Thiometaescaline (3-TME) (3-ethylthio-4,5-dimethoxyphenethylamine)
- 5-Thiometaescaline (5-TME) (3-ethoxy-4-methoxy-5-methylthiophenethylamine)
- 3-Thiosymbescaline (3-TSB) (3-ethoxy-4-methoxy-5-ethylthiophenethylamine)
- 3-Thiotrescaline (3-T-TRIS; 3-thiotrisescaline) (3,4-diethoxy-5-ethylthiophenethylamine)
- 3,4,5-Trideoxymescaline (TMePEA) (3,4,5-trimethylphenethylamine)

=== 2- or 6-Substituted ===
- 2-Bromo-6-chloromescaline (2-bromo-6-chloro-3,4,5-trimethoxyphenethylamine)
- 2-Bromo-6-methylmescaline (2-bromo-6-methyl-3,4,5-trimethoxyphenethylamine)
- 2-Bromomescaline (2-bromo-3,4,5-trimethoxyphenethylamine)
- 2-Chloromescaline (2-chloro-3,4,5-trimethoxyphenethylamine)
- 2-Iodomescaline (2-iodo-3,4,5-trimethoxyphenethylamine)
- 2-Methylmescaline (2-methyl-3,4,5-trimethoxyphenethylamine)
- 2,6-Dibromomescaline (2,6-dibromo-3,4,5-trimethoxyphenethylamine)
- 2,6-Dichloromescaline (2,6-dichloro-3,4,5-trimethoxyphenethylamine)
- 2,6-Dimethylmescaline (2,6-dimethyl-3,4,5-trimethoxyphenethylamine)
- 2,3,4,5,6-Pentamethoxyphenethylamine (PeMPEA; 2,6-dimethoxymescaline)
- 2,3,4,5-Tetramethoxyphenethylamine (TeMPEA; TeMPEA-1; 2-methoxymescaline)

=== N-Substituted ===
- N-Acetylmescaline (N-acetyl-3,4,5-trimethoxyphenethylamine)
- N-Formylmescaline (N-formyl-3,4,5-trimethoxyphenethylamine)
- N,N-Diformylmescaline (N,N-diformyl-3,4,5-trimethoxyphenethylamine)
- Mescaloruvic acid (N-(1-carboxyethyl)mescaline; N-(1-carboxyethyl)-3,4,5-trimethoxyphenethylamine)
- Mescaloxylic acid (N-carboxymethylmescaline; N-carboxymethyl-3,4,5-trimethoxyphenethylamine)
- N-Methylmescaline (M-M) (N-methyl-3,4,5-trimethoxyphenethylamine)
- M-NDEPA (N-diethylaminocarbonylethyl-3,4,5-trimethoxyamphetamine)
- NBOMe-escaline (N-(2-methoxybenzyl)-4-ethoxy-3,5-dimethoxyphenethylamine)
- NBOMe-mescaline (N-(2-methoxybenzyl)-3,4,5-trimethoxyphenethylamine)
- Trichocereine (MM-M) (N,N-dimethylmescaline; N,N-dimethyl-3,4,5-trimethoxyphenethylamine)

=== α- or β-Substituted ===
- α-Ethylmescaline (AEM) (α-ethyl-3,4,5-trimethoxyphenethylamine)
- β-Hydroxymescaline (β-HOM; mescalol) (3,4,5-trimethoxy-β-hydroxyphenethylamine)
- β-Methoxymescaline (BOM) (β,3,4,5-tetramethoxyphenethylamine)
- 3,4,5-Trimethoxyamphetamine (3,4,5-TMA; TMA; TMA-1; α-methylmescaline)

=== Cyclized ===
- Bromojimscaline (1-(7-bromo-4,5,6-trimethoxy-2,3-dihydro-1H-inden-1-yl)methanamine)
- Bromotomscaline (1-(5-bromo-2,3,4-trimethoxybicyclo[4.2.0]octa-1,3,5-trien-7-yl)methanamine)
- Flyscaline (mescaline-FLY)
- Hemi-flyscaline (mescaline-hemiFLY)
- Jimscaline (1-(4,5,6-trimethoxy-2,3-dihydro-1H-inden-1-yl)methylamine)
- Tomscaline (1-(2,3,4-trimethoxybicyclo[4.2.0]octa-1,3,5-trien-7-yl)methylamine)
- UCD0120-M (UCD0120-mescaline; N,N-diethyl-1-methyl-5-(3,4,5-trimethoxyphenyl)-1,2,3,6-tetrahydropyridine-3-carboxamide)

=== Deuterated ===
- 2,6-D (2,6-dideuteromescaline; 2,6-dideutero-3,4,5-trimethoxyphenethylamine)
- 3,5-D (3,5-di(trideutero)mescaline; 4-methoxy-3,5-di(trideuteromethoxy)phenethylamine)
- 4-D (4-trideuteromescaline; 4-trideuteromethoxy-3,5-methoxyphenethylamine)
- Alpha-D (α-D; 3,4,5-trimethoxy-α,α-dideuterophenethylamine; α,α-dideuteromescaline)
- Alpha,Beta-D (α,β-D; 3,4,5-trimethoxy-α,β-dideuterophenethylamine; α,β-dideuteromescaline)
- Beta-D (β-D; 3,4,5-trimethoxy-β,β-dideuterophenethylamine; β,β-dideuteromescaline)

=== Other compounds ===
- 3-Methoxy-4,5-dihydroxyphenethylamine (4-O-,5-O-didesmethylmescaline)
- 3,5-Dimethoxyphenethylamine (3,5-DMPEA; 4-desmethoxymescaline)
- Dimetofrine (3,5-dimethoxy-4,β-dihydroxy-N-methylphenethylamine; β-hydroxy-N-methyl-4-O-desmethylmescaline)
- Isomescaline (IM) (2,3,4-trimethoxyphenethylamine)
- Lophophine (2C-MMDA; 5-methoxy-MDPEA; MMDPEA; 3-methoxy-4,5-methylenedioxyphenethylamine)
- 2-Thioisomescaline (2-TIM) (2-methylthio-3,4-dimethoxyphenethylamine)
- 3-Thioisomescaline (3-TIM) (3-methylthio-2,4-dimethoxyphenethylamine)
- 4-Thioisomescaline (4-TIM) (4-methylthio-2,4-dimethoxyphenethylamine)

== Related compounds ==
- 3,4-Dimethoxyphenethylamine (DMPEA; 3,4-DMPEA; homoveratrylamine; 3-desmethoxymescaline)
- 3-Methoxy-4-ethoxyphenethylamine (MEPEA; 3-desmethoxyescaline)
- 3-Methoxy-4-allyloxyphenethylamine (MAPEA; 3-desmethoxyallylescaline)
- 3-Methoxy-4-propoxyamphetamine (POMA; 3-desmethoxyproscaline)
- 6-Br-DMPEA (2-bromo-4,5-dimethoxyphenethylamine; o-2C-B)

== See also ==
- Substituted methoxyphenethylamine
- 3C (psychedelics) (4-substituted 3,5-dimethoxyamphetamines)
- Desoxyscaline
- PiHKAL (Phenethylamines I Have Known and Loved)
- The Shulgin Index, Volume One: Psychedelic Phenethylamines and Related Compounds
