= Allylescaline =

Psychedelic drug

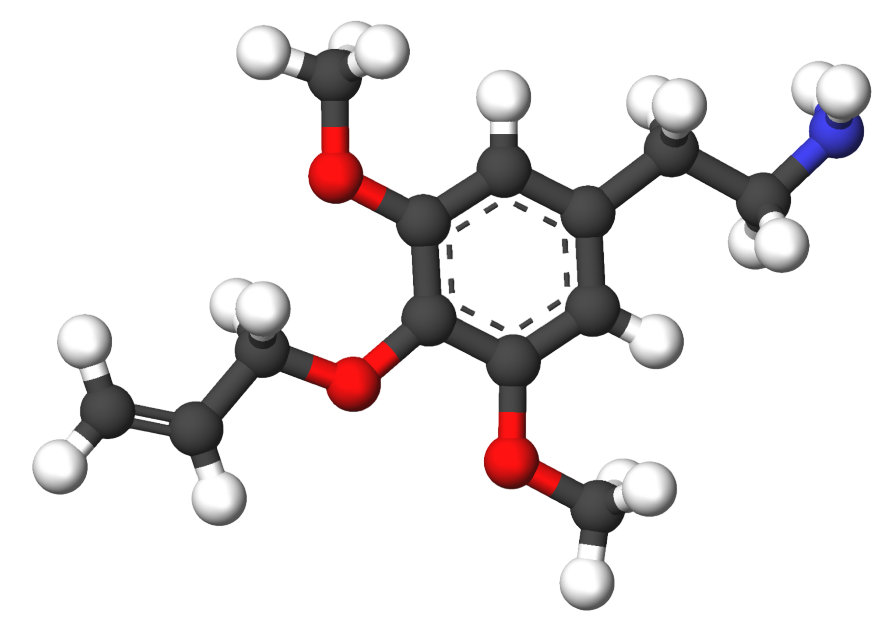

Clinical data
- Other names: AL; Allylmescaline; 4-Allyloxy-3,5-dimethoxyphenethylamine; 3,5-Dimethoxy-4-allyloxyphenethylamine
- Routes of administration: Oral
- Drug class: Serotonin 5-HT_{2} receptor agonist; Serotonin 5-HT_{2A} receptor agonist; Serotonergic psychedelic; Hallucinogen
- ATC code: None

Pharmacokinetic data
- Onset of action: 10–50 minutes
- Duration of action: 8–12 hours

Identifiers
- IUPAC name: {3,5-dimethoxy-4-[(prop-2-en-1-yl)oxy]phenyl}ethan-1-amine
- CAS Number: 39201-75-7
- PubChem CID: 44719469
- ChemSpider: 21106254
- UNII: J39IWS08EN
- ChEMBL: ChEMBL126803
- CompTox Dashboard (EPA): DTXSID80660348

Chemical and physical data
- Formula: C_{13}H_{19}NO_{3}
- Molar mass: 237.299 g·mol^{−1}
- 3D model (JSmol): Interactive image
- SMILES: COc1cc(cc(OC)c1OCC=C)CCN
- InChI: InChI=1S/C13H19NO3/c1-4-7-17-13-11(15-2)8-10(5-6-14)9-12(13)16-3/h4,8-9H,1,5-7,14H2,2-3H3; Key:JNUAYHHGCXYBHX-UHFFFAOYSA-N

Allylescaline (AL), or allylmescaline, also known as 4-allyloxy-3,5-dimethoxyphenethylamine, is a psychedelic drug of the phenethylamine and scaline families related to mescaline. It is taken orally.

The drug acts as an agonist of the serotonin 5-HT_{2} receptors, including the serotonin 5-HT_{2A} receptor. It is closely related to other scalines including mescaline, escaline, and proscaline, among others.

Allylescaline was first described in the scientific literature by Otakar Leminger in 1972. Subsequently, it was further described by Alexander Shulgin in his 1991 book PiHKAL (Phenethylamines I Have Known and Loved). It was encountered as a novel designer drug in 2013.

== Use and effects ==
According to Alexander Shulgin in his book PiHKAL (Phenethylamines I Have Known and Loved) and other publications, the dose range of allylescaline is 20 to 35 mg and its duration is 8 to 12 hours. Its onset ranged from 10 minutes to 50 minutes, with peak effects occurring at around 1 to 1.25 hours. The drug has been described as having a very gradual onset, an unusually long plateau of effects, a very gradual descent, and some effects persisting past 12 hours or even into the middle of the next day. Allylescaline is about 10 times as potent as mescaline, which has a listed dose range of 200 to 400 mg. It was the most potent scaline (mescaline analogue) of all those described.

The effects of allylescaline have been reported to include perceptual changes, warmer and enhanced colors, objects looking different or more "plastic", colorful hallucinations in the dark, surroundings being much more interesting than usual, no sharpening of the senses including visual, auditory, or olfactory, pleasantly and abundantly increased energy, creative and free-flowing thoughts, clearheadedness, unusual ease of free association, everything feeling funny and laughter, feelings of inner excitement and enjoyment, desire to move, simultaneous positive and negative feelings, working through and being freed of depression, feelings of dissociation and being disconnected from one's thoughts, wholly social and no requirement of withdrawal, religious feelings and connection, slight vertigo, light drunkenness, restless sleep and unusual and difficult dreams during sleep, and next-day hangover such as lethargy.

== Pharmacology ==
=== Pharmacodynamics ===
Allylescaline acts as a potent agonist of the serotonin 5-HT_{2} receptors, including the serotonin 5-HT_{2A}, 5-HT_{2B}, and 5-HT_{2C} receptors. It also possesses other activities, such as weak interactions with dopamine D_{2}-like receptors. A 2021 study evaluated the pharmacodynamics of many scalines, but did not include allylescaline. However, a subsequent 2025 study comprehensively assessed and reported the drug's pharmacodynamics.

== Chemistry ==
=== Synthesis ===
The chemical synthesis of allylescaline has been described.

=== Analogues ===
Analogues of allylescaline include mescaline, escaline, proscaline, propynyl, methallylescaline, cyclopropylmescaline, and 3C-AL, among others.

== History ==
Allylescaline was first synthesized and studied by Otakar Leminger in 1972. The drug was later synthesized by Alexander Shulgin and further described in his 1991 book PiHKAL (Phenethylamines I Have Known and Loved). It was encountered as a novel designer drug in Europe in 2013.

== Society and culture ==
=== Legal status ===
==== Canada ====
Allylescaline is not a controlled substance in Canada as of 2025.

==== Sweden ====
Allylescaline is illegal in Sweden as of January 2016.

==== United States ====
Allylescaline is not an explicitly controlled substance in the United States. However, it could be considered a controlled substance under the Federal Analogue Act if intended for human consumption.

== See also ==
- Scaline
- Elemicin
