= Proscaline =

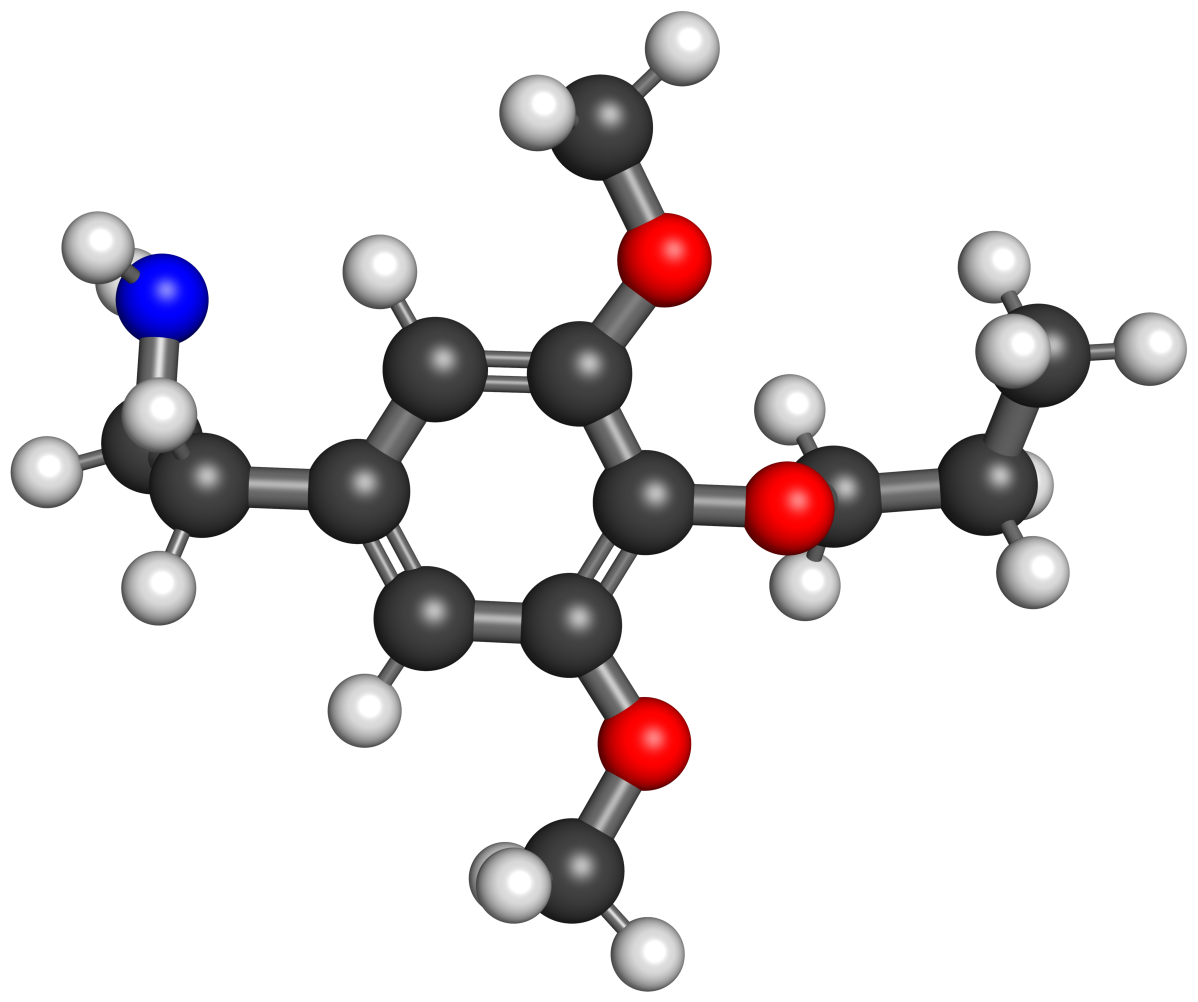

Clinical data
- Other names: 4-Propoxy-3,5-dimethoxyphenethylamine; 4-Propoxy-3,5-DMPEA
- Routes of administration: Oral
- Drug class: Serotonin 5-HT_{2} receptor agonist; Serotonergic psychedelic; Hallucinogen
- ATC code: None

Pharmacokinetic data
- Duration of action: 8–12 hours

Identifiers
- IUPAC name: 2-(3,5-dimethoxy-4-propoxyphenyl)ethan-1-amine
- CAS Number: 39201-78-0
- PubChem CID: 15102790
- ChemSpider: 10439596
- UNII: 99G781N5IO
- ChEMBL: ChEMBL340765
- CompTox Dashboard (EPA): DTXSID00192454

Chemical and physical data
- Formula: C_{13}H_{21}NO_{3}
- Molar mass: 239.315 g·mol^{−1}
- 3D model (JSmol): Interactive image
- SMILES: COc1cc(cc(OC)c1OCCC)CCN
- InChI: InChI=1S/C13H21NO3/c1-4-7-17-13-11(15-2)8-10(5-6-14)9-12(13)16-3/h8-9H,4-7,14H2,1-3H3; Key:HYWLMSUAZVDUFW-UHFFFAOYSA-N

Proscaline, also known as 4-propoxy-3,5-dimethoxyphenethylamine, is a psychedelic drug of the phenethylamine and scaline families related to mescaline. It is taken orally.

== Use and effects ==
In his book PiHKAL (Phenethylamines I Have Known and Loved) and other publications, Alexander Shulgin reports that a dose of 30 to 60 mg orally produces effects lasting 8 to 12 hours. The onset was not described, but peak effects occurred after about 2 hours. A typical dose estimate is 45 mg. Doses as high as 80 mg have also been explored. The drug is about six times the potency of mescaline, which itself has a listed dose range of 200 to 400 mg.

The effects of proscaline have been reported to include insignificant closed-eye visuals, sharpening of the senses, hyperawareness, relaxation and feeling at ease, deep feelings of peace and contentment, euphoria, no enhanced clarity or deep realizations, feelings of uninhibited eroticism, pain relief, drowsiness, intoxication and feeling drunk, irritability, restlessness, tremors, insomnia, difficulty with dreams, long-lasting residual effects, and no next-day hangover.

== Pharmacology ==
=== Pharmacodynamics ===
Proscaline is a serotonin 5-HT_{2} receptor agonist, including of the serotonin 5-HT_{2A}, 5-HT_{2B}, and 5-HT_{2C} receptors. Activation of the serotonin 5-HT_{2A} receptor is thought to be responsible for its psychedelic effects. The drug is much more potent as an agonist of the serotonin 5-HT_{2C} receptor than as an agonist of the serotonin 5-HT_{2A} or 5-HT_{2B} receptors.

It produces the head-twitch response, a behavioral proxy of psychedelic effects, in rodents.

== Chemistry ==
Proscaline, also known as 4-propoxy-3,5-dimethoxyphenethylamine, is a substituted phenethylamine and scaline (4-substituted 3,5-dimethoxyphenethylamine) derivative related to mescaline (3,4,5-trimethoxyphenethylamine). It is the 4-propoxy homologue of mescaline.

=== Properties ===
Proscaline is much more lipophilic than mescaline or escaline (log P = 1.70, 0.78, and 1.11, respectively), which is expected to be more optimal and advantageous in terms of drug-like properties such as blood–brain barrier permeability.

=== Synthesis ===
The chemical synthesis of proscaline has been described.

=== Analogues ===
Analogues of proscaline include mescaline, escaline, isoproscaline, allylescaline, methallylescaline, propynyl, cyclopropylmescaline, cycloproscaline, fluoroproscaline, and 3C-P, among others.

== History ==
Proscaline was first synthesized and studied by Otakar Leminger in 1972. The drug was later synthesized by Alexander Shulgin and further described in his 1991 book PiHKAL (Phenethylamines I Have Known and Loved). It was encountered as a novel designer drug in Europe in 2013.

== Society and culture ==
=== Legal status ===
==== Canada ====
Proscaline is not a controlled substance in Canada as of 2025.

==== United Kingdom ====
Proscaline is a Class A controlled substance in the United Kingdom.

==== United States ====
Proscaline is not an explicitly controlled substance in the United States. However, it could be considered a controlled substance under the Federal Analogue Act if intended for human consumption.

== See also ==
- Scaline
