= Body load =

Physical sensations caused by psychoactive drugs

Body load is the specific physical or tactile sensations brought on by psychoactive drugs, especially psychedelics. Generally, body load is an unpleasant physical sensation that is difficult to describe objectively either in terms of other sensations or in its specific location. However, it could be likened to an instinct of the body sensing it is about to be placed under exceptional stress, a state of pre-shock. Common symptoms include stomach ache, nausea, dizziness, feelings of being over-stimulated or "wired," shivering, feelings of excessive tension in the torso, or, in more severe cases, shortness of breath or a feeling of suffocation. Different drugs may cause different body load sensations which vary in intensity and duration.

In contrast, many drug users, and particularly users of cannabis, entactogens like MDMA or of certain synthetic phenethylamines (most notably the popular 2C-B) and tryptamines, also often report a "body high" or "body rush", which is similar to body load in many respects but is usually considered pleasant.

== Causes ==
The causes of the experience of body load are unknown. However, one proposed mechanism is the stimulation of serotonergic 5-HT receptors, particularly those involved in tactile sensation and, equally importantly in many cases where nausea is experienced, those located along the lining of the digestive tract. Serotonin is heavily involved in appetite control, and over-stimulation of serotonergic receptors has been shown to cause nausea in overdoses of SSRIs or MDMA. Many psychedelics which can cause body load are partial serotonin agonists, which work by mimicking the structure of serotonin to varying degrees.
