= Escaline =

Psychedelic phenthylamine drug

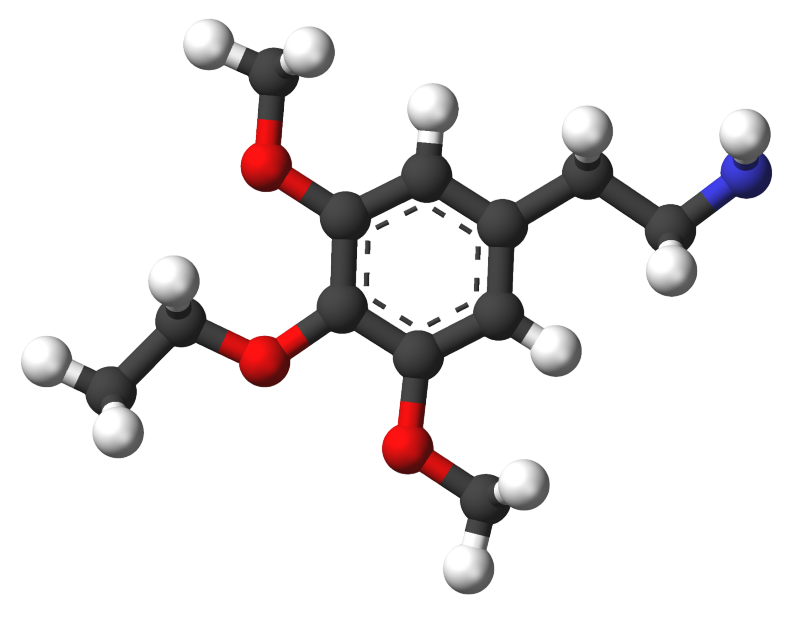

Clinical data
- Other names: E; 3,5-Dimethoxy-4-ethoxyphenethylamine; 4-Ethoxy-3,5-dimethoxyphenethylamine
- Routes of administration: Oral
- Drug class: Serotonin receptor modulator; Serotonin 5-HT_{2A} receptor agonist; Serotonergic psychedelic; Hallucinogen
- ATC code: None

Pharmacokinetic data
- Duration of action: 8–12 hours

Identifiers
- IUPAC name: 2-(4-ethoxy-3,5-dimethoxyphenyl)ethan-1-amine
- CAS Number: 39201-82-6
- PubChem CID: 38240
- ChemSpider: 35053
- UNII: Q13F1C1N8I
- ChEMBL: ChEMBL319415
- CompTox Dashboard (EPA): DTXSID60192455

Chemical and physical data
- Formula: C_{12}H_{19}NO_{3}
- Molar mass: 225.288 g·mol^{−1}
- 3D model (JSmol): Interactive image
- Melting point: 165 to 166 °C (329 to 331 °F) (hydrochloride)
- SMILES: NCCC1=CC(OC)=C(OCC)C(OC)=C1
- InChI: InChI=1S/C12H19NO3/c1-4-16-12-10(14-2)7-9(5-6-13)8-11(12)15-3/h7-8H,4-6,13H2,1-3H3; Key:RHOGRSKNWDNCDN-UHFFFAOYSA-N

Escaline (E), also known as 3,5-dimethoxy-4-ethoxyphenethylamine, is a psychedelic drug of the phenethylamine and scaline families related to mescaline. It is the 4-ethoxy analogue of mescaline (3,4,5-trimethoxyphenethylamine) and the phenethylamine (non-α-methyl) analogue of 3C-E (3,5-dimethoxy-4-ethoxyamphetamine). The drug has been encountered as a novel designer drug.

== Use and effects ==
In his book PiHKAL (Phenethylamines I Have Known and Loved), Alexander Shulgin lists escaline's dose range as 40 to 60 mg orally. The duration is stated to be 8 to 12 hours, whereas the onset is not described. Escaline is approximately 5- to 8-fold more potent than mescaline.

The effects of escaline have been described relatively limitedly but have been reported to include sensory enhancement without an intellectual component, little synthesis of external sensory inputs like music or visual stimuli, easy fantasy, rational thinking and insight, pleasantness, powerful and complex intoxication, pain relief, muscle tension, motor incoordination to the extent of not being able to walk or tie one's shoelaces, body tension that outweighed the desired psychoactive effects, tachycardia, dehydration, nightmares, and next-day hangover symptoms such as tiredness and low energy.

== Pharmacology ==
=== Pharmacodynamics ===
Escaline activities
Target	Affinity (K_{i}, nM)
5-HT_{1A}	>10,000 (K_{i}); 372–724 (EC_{50}); 23–40% (E_{max})
5-HT_{1B}	>10,000 (K_{i}); 513–1,410 (EC_{50}); 62–98% (E_{max})
5-HT_{1D}	724 (K_{i}); 117–2,690 (EC_{50}); 56–100% (E_{max})
5-HT_{1E}	>10,000 (K_{i}); 4,370–7,590 (EC_{50}); 73–113% (E_{max})
5-HT_{1F}	ND (K_{i}); 182–3,470 (EC_{50}); 20–72% (E_{max})
5-HT_{2A}	216–>10,000 (K_{i}); 107–2,140 (EC_{50}); 62–108% (E_{max})
5-HT_{2B}	148–551 (K_{i}); 257–708 (EC_{50}); 53–105% (E_{max})
5-HT_{2C}	177–4,366 (K_{i}); 741–2,450 (EC_{50}); 68–112% (E_{max})
5-HT_{3}	>10,000
5-HT_{4}	ND
5-HT_{5A}	>10,000
5-HT_{6}	>10,000
5-HT_{7}	>10,000
α_{1A}–α_{1D}	>10,000
α_{2A}	2,450
α_{2B}	>10,000
α_{2C}	4,790
β_{1}–β_{3}	>10,000
D_{1}, D_{2}	>10,000
D_{3}	380
D_{4}	525 (K_{i}); 1,290–6,610 (EC_{50}); 24–88% (E_{max})
D_{5}	>10,000
H_{1}–H_{4}	>10,000
M_{1}–M_{5}	>10,000
TAAR_{1}	ND
I_{1}	ND
σ_{1}, σ_{2}	>10,000
SERT	>10,000 (K_{i}); ND (IC_{50})
NET	>10,000 (K_{i}); ND (IC_{50})
DAT	>10,000 (K_{i}); ND (IC_{50})
Notes: The smaller the value, the more avidly the drug binds to the site. All proteins are human unless otherwise specified. Refs:

The comprehensive receptor interactions of escaline have been described. It acts as an agonist of the serotonin 5-HT_{1A}, 5-HT_{1B}, 5-HT_{1D}, 5-HT_{2A}, 5-HT_{2B}, and 5-HT_{2C} receptors, among other actions. The drug is also an agonist of the dopamine D_{4} receptor, though not of any other dopamine receptors. Besides escaline, the receptor interactions of various escaline analogues and derivatives have been described.

Escaline produces the head-twitch response, a behavioral proxy of psychedelic-like effects, in rodents. It partially substitutes for LSD in rodent drug discrimination tests. The drug is unusual among serotonergic psychedelics in only partially rather than fully substituting for LSD.

== Chemistry ==
=== Synthesis ===
The chemical synthesis of escaline has been described.

=== Analogues ===
Analogues of escaline include mescaline, proscaline, allylescaline, methallylescaline, 3C-E, and 3-methoxy-4-ethoxyphenethylamine (MEPEA; 3-desmethoxyescaline), among others.

== History ==
Escaline was first described in the scientific literature by George S. Grace in 1934. Subsequently, it was also described by F. Benington and colleagues in 1954. It was later further described by Otakar Leminger in 1972. Then, it was studied by David E. Nichols and colleagues, who prepared a series of mescaline analogues that included escaline, proscaline, and isoproscaline and published their work in 1977.

== Society and culture ==
=== Legal status ===
==== Canada ====
Escaline is not a controlled substance in Canada as of 2025.

==== Sweden ====
Escaline is illegal in Sweden as of 26 January 2016.

==== United States ====
Escaline is a Schedule I controlled substance (DEA #7930) in the United States with the reason cited being that it is a positional isomer of 3,4,5-trimethoxyamphetamine (TMA).

== See also ==
- Scaline
