= Peyton Jacob III =

American researcher

- Other names: Peyton Jacob the Third; Peyton Jacob the 3rd
- Education: University of California, Davis (B.S.); Purdue University (Ph.D.)
- Occupations: Chemist; Pharmacologist
- Years active: 1972–present
- Organization: University of California, San Francisco
- Website: https://tobaccoresearchcenter.ucsf.edu/peyton-jacob-iii-phd https://cancer.ucsf.edu/people/jacob.peyton

Peyton Jacob III is an American chemist and pharmacologist who has studied nicotine, methamphetamine, hallucinogens, entactogens, and other psychoactive drugs. He is a researcher at the University of California, San Francisco (UCSF). Jacob extensively collaborated with and was close friends with Alexander Shulgin, including being part of his research group self-testing new psychedelic compounds. Among many other contributions, they developed the Shulgin Rating Scale together and methylone was first synthesized and described by the pair in the mid-1990s.

== Selected publications ==
- Braun U, Braun G, Jacob P, Nichols DE, Shulgin AT (1978). "Mescaline analogs: substitutions at the 4-position" (PDF). NIDA Res Monogr (22): 27–37. PMID 101882. Archived from the original (PDF) on August 5, 2023.
- Shulgin AT, Shulgin LA, Jacob P (May 1986). "A protocol for the evaluation of new psychoactive drugs in man". Methods Find Exp Clin Pharmacol. 8 (5): 313–320. PMID 3724306.
- Nichols DE, Hoffman AJ, Oberlender RA, Jacob P, Shulgin AT (October 1986). "Derivatives of 1-(1,3-benzodioxol-5-yl)-2-butanamine: representatives of a novel therapeutic class" (PDF). J Med Chem. 29 (10): 2009–2015. doi:10.1021/jm00160a035. PMID 3761319.
- Benowitz NL, Porchet H, Sheiner L, Jacob P (July 1988). "Nicotine absorption and cardiovascular effects with smokeless tobacco use: comparison with cigarettes and nicotine gum". Clin Pharmacol Ther. 44 (1): 23–8. doi:10.1038/clpt.1988.107. PMID 3391001.
- Jacob P, Shulgin AT (1994). "Structure-activity relationships of the classic hallucinogens and their analogs" (PDF). NIDA Res Monogr. 146: 74–91. PMID 8742795. Archived from the original (PDF) on August 5, 2023.
- Mendelson J, Jones RT, Upton R, Jacob P (May 1995). "Methamphetamine and ethanol interactions in humans". Clin Pharmacol Ther. 57 (5): 559–568. doi:10.1016/0009-9236(95)90041-1. PMID 7768079.
- Pérez-Stable EJ, Herrera B, Jacob P, Benowitz NL (July 1998). "Nicotine metabolism and intake in black and white smokers". JAMA. 280 (2): 152–156. doi:10.1001/jama.280.2.152. PMID 9669788.
- Cozzi NV, Sievert MK, Shulgin AT, Jacob P, Ruoho AE (September 1999). "Inhibition of plasma membrane monoamine transporters by beta-ketoamphetamines". Eur J Pharmacol. 381 (1): 63–69. doi:10.1016/s0014-2999(99)00538-5. PMID 10528135.
- Mendelson J, Uemura N, Harris D, Nath RP, Fernandez E, Jacob P, Everhart ET, Jones RT (October 2006). "Human pharmacology of the methamphetamine stereoisomers" (PDF). Clin Pharmacol Ther. 80 (4): 403–420. doi:10.1016/j.clpt.2006.06.013. PMID 17015058.
- Benowitz NL, Hukkanen J, Jacob P (2009). "Nicotine Chemistry, Metabolism, Kinetics and Biomarkers". Nicotine Psychopharmacology. Handbook of Experimental Pharmacology. Vol. 192. pp. 29–60. doi:10.1007/978-3-540-69248-5_2. ISBN 978-3-540-69246-1. PMC 2953858. PMID 19184645.
- Goniewicz ML, Knysak J, Gawron M, Kosmider L, Sobczak A, Kurek J, Prokopowicz A, Jablonska-Czapla M, Rosik-Dulewska C, Havel C, Jacob P, Benowitz N (March 2014). "Levels of selected carcinogens and toxicants in vapour from electronic cigarettes" (PDF). Tob Control. 23 (2): 133–139. doi:10.1136/tobaccocontrol-2012-050859. PMC 4154473. PMID 23467656.

== See also ==
- List of psychedelic chemists
