= C12H19NOS =

The molecular formula C_{12}H_{19}NOS (molar mass: 225.35 g/mol) may refer to:

- TOM (drug)
  - 2-TOM
  - 5-TOM
- 2C-5-TOET
