= Aleph-2 =

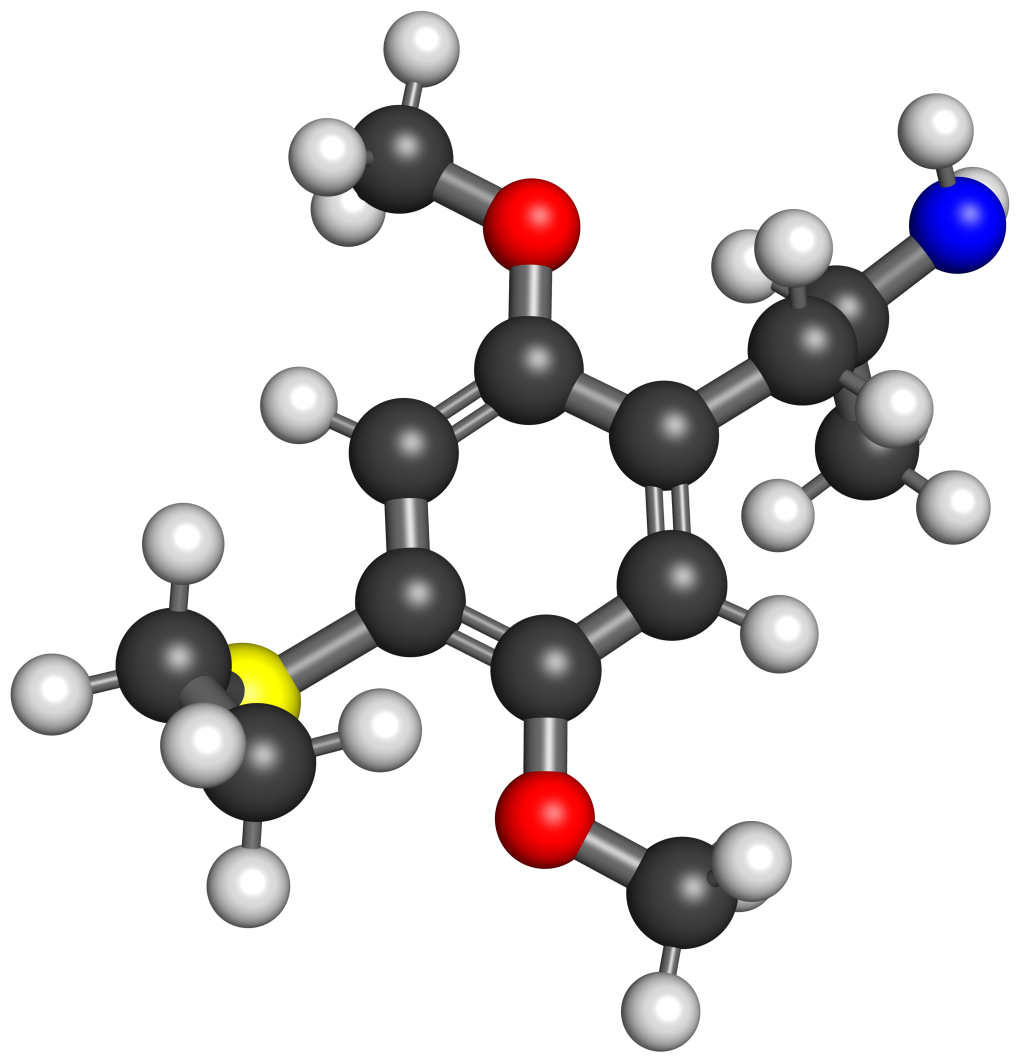

Clinical data
- Other names: ALEPH-2; DOT-2; 4-Ethylthio-2,5-dimethoxyamphetamine; 2,5-Dimethoxy-4-ethylthioamphetamine; 4-EtS-DMA
- Routes of administration: Oral
- Drug class: Serotonergic psychedelic; Hallucinogen; Serotonin 5-HT_{2} receptor agonist
- ATC code: None

Pharmacokinetic data
- Duration of action: 8–16 hours

Identifiers
- IUPAC name: 1-(4-ethylsulfanyl-2,5-dimethoxyphenyl)propan-2-amine
- CAS Number: 185562-00-9
- PubChem CID: 10264356
- DrugBank: DB13940
- ChemSpider: 8439835
- UNII: Z1I419DRZZ
- ChEMBL: ChEMBL339611
- CompTox Dashboard (EPA): DTXSID401043188

Chemical and physical data
- Formula: C_{13}H_{21}NO_{2}S
- Molar mass: 255.38 g·mol^{−1}
- 3D model (JSmol): Interactive image
- SMILES: CCSC1=C(C=C(C(=C1)OC)CC(C)N)OC
- InChI: InChI=1S/C13H21NO2S/c1-5-17-13-8-11(15-3)10(6-9(2)14)7-12(13)16-4/h7-9H,5-6,14H2,1-4H3; Key:MCYCODJKXUJSAT-UHFFFAOYSA-N

Aleph-2, or ALEPH-2, also known as 4-ethylthio-2,5-dimethoxyamphetamine, is a psychedelic drug of the phenethylamine, amphetamine, and DOx families. It is one of the Aleph series of compounds. The drug was encountered as a novel designer drug in Europe in 2023.

== Use and effects ==
In his book PiHKAL (Phenethylamines I Have Known and Loved), Alexander Shulgin lists Aleph-2's dose as 4 to 8 mg orally and its duration as 8 to 16 hours. The effects of Aleph-2 have been reported to include "almost no visual phenomena" to "extraordinary visuals and interpretations", visual distortion and movement, enhanced auditory and tactile perception, and a sensation of physical warmth, and residual shakiness and muscle tremors, among others. There is an unpredictability with the dosing and effects of Aleph-2, such that one person who took 4 mg had strong effects including ending up in a fetal position, in relative hibernation for several hours, and with substantial amnesia, whereas another person who took 8 mg experienced only a bare threshold including slight lightheadedness.

== Pharmacology ==
=== Pharmacodynamics ===
Aleph-2 activities
Target	Affinity (K_{i}, nM)
5-HT_{1A}	1,674
5-HT_{1B}	2,037
5-HT_{1D}	1,532
5-HT_{1E}	3,088
5-HT_{1F}	ND
5-HT_{2A}	60.4 (K_{i}); 0.489–0.898 (EC_{50}); 104–108% (E_{max})
5-HT_{2B}	1.6
5-HT_{2C}	50.3 (K_{i}); 0.0912–0.401 (EC_{50}); 105–114% (E_{max})
5-HT_{3}	>10,000
5-HT_{4}	ND
5-HT_{5A}	>10,000
5-HT_{6}	3,020
5-HT_{7}	1,322
α_{1A}	>10,000
α_{1B}	>10,000
α_{1D}	ND
α_{2A}	5,803
α_{2B}	2,934
α_{2C}	1,388
β_{1}	6,792
β_{2}	26.1
β_{3}	ND
D_{1}, D_{2}	>10,000
D_{3}	618.3
D_{4}, D_{5}	>10,000
H_{1}–H_{4}	>10,000
M_{1}, M_{2}	>10,000
M_{3}	1,907
M_{4}	>10,000
M_{5}	8,018
I_{1}	319.8
σ_{1}	238.9
σ_{2}	>10,000
TAAR1	ND
SERT	1,318 (K_{i})
NET	>10,000 (K_{i})
DAT	>10,000 (K_{i})
MAO-A	3,200–3,800 (IC_{50}) (rat)
MAO-B	>100,000 (IC_{50}) (rat)
Notes: The smaller the value, the more avidly the drug binds to the site. All proteins are human unless otherwise specified. Refs:

Aleph-2 acts as a serotonin 5-HT_{2} receptor agonist. The drug is also a weak monoamine oxidase inhibitor (MAOI), with IC_{50} values of 3,200 nM for monoamine oxidase A (MAO-A) and >100,000 nM for monoamine oxidase B (MAO-B). Aleph-2 produces anxiolytic effects in rodents.

== Chemistry ==
=== Synthesis ===
The chemical synthesis of Aleph-2 has been described.

=== Analogues ===
Analogues of Aleph-2 include Aleph, Aleph-4, Aleph-6, Aleph-7, and 2C-T-2, among others.

== History ==
Aleph-2 was first described in the scientific literature by Alexander Shulgin in 1978. Subsequently, it was described in greater detail by Shulgin in his 1991 book PiHKAL (Phenethylamines I Have Known and Loved). Aleph-2 was encountered as a novel designer drug in Europe in 2023.

== Society and culture ==
=== Legal status ===
==== Canada ====
Aleph-2 is a controlled substance in Canada under phenethylamine blanket-ban language.

==== United States ====
Aleph-2 is not an explicitly controlled substance in the United States. However, it is a Schedule I controlled substance in this country as an isomer of 2C-T-4.

== See also ==
- DOx (psychedelics)
- Aleph (psychedelics)
- 2C-T-2
