= 2C-BI-8 =

Clinical data
- Other names: 2,5-Dimethoxy-4-(4-methoxyphenyl)phenethylamine; 2C-(4-MeO-Ph); 4′-Methoxy-2C-Ph
- Drug class: Serotonin receptor modulator
- ATC code: None

Identifiers
- IUPAC name: 2-(2,4′,5-trimethoxy[1,1′-biphenyl]-4-yl)ethan-1-amine

Chemical and physical data
- Formula: C_{17}H_{21}NO_{3}
- Molar mass: 287.359 g·mol^{−1}
- 3D model (JSmol): Interactive image
- SMILES: NCCc1cc(OC)c(cc1OC)c1ccc(cc1)OC
- InChI: InChI=1S/C17H21NO3/c1-19-14-6-4-12(5-7-14)15-11-16(20-2)13(8-9-18)10-17(15)21-3/h4-7,10-11H,8-9,18H2,1-3H3; Key:ZALWHJKGZWNFNR-UHFFFAOYSA-N

2C-BI-8, also known as 2,5-dimethoxy-4-(4-methoxyphenyl)phenethylamine or as 4′-methoxy-2C-Ph, is a serotonin receptor agonist of the phenethylamine and 2C families. It is the derivative of 2C-Ph (2C-BI-1) with a methoxy group at the 4 position of the added phenyl ring.

The drug binds to and/or activates the serotonin 5-HT_{2} receptors. At the human serotonin 5-HT_{2A} receptor, its affinity (K_{i}) is 19 nM, activational potency (EC_{50}) is 37 nM, and intrinsic activity (E_{max}) is 40%. These were among the most potent and efficacious in a series of evaluated 2C-Ph derivatives (2C-BI compounds) that included 2C-BI-8. However, 2C-BI-8's activational potency was about 18-fold lower than that of 2C-B and its efficacy was less than half of that of 2C-B. The drug also interacts with certain other monoamine receptors and has been assessed at the monoamine transporters. It may have the potential to produce psychedelic effects in humans.

2C-BI-8 was first described in the scientific literature by Daniel Trachsel and David E. Nichols and colleagues in 2009. It is a controlled substance in Canada under phenethylamine blanket-ban language.

== See also ==
- 2C (psychedelics)
- Biscaline
- 2C-T-27
- 2C-T-33
- 4-PhPr-2,5-DMA (DOPP/DOPhPr)
- 2,5-Dimethoxy-4-benzylamphetamine (DOBz)
