= C16H19NO2 =

The molecular formula C_{16}H_{19}NO_{2} may refer to:

- 2C-Ph
- 4-Allyl-6-oxa-noribogainalog
- Biscaline
- Medifoxamine
