= C17H21NO3 =

The molecular formula C_{17}H_{21}NO_{3} (molar mass: 287.35 g/mol) may refer to:

- Benzscaline
- 2C-BI-8
- Dihydromorphine
- Etodolac
- Galantamine
- Mesembrenone
- Ritodrine
- Thesinine
