= 2C-T-33 =

Clinical data
- Other names: 4-(3-Methoxybenzylthio)-2,5-dimethoxyphenethylamine; 2,5-Dimethoxy-4-(3-methoxybenzylthio)phenethylamine; 4-(3-Methoxy)benzylthio-2C
- Routes of administration: Unknown
- Drug class: Serotonin receptor agonist; Serotonin 5-HT_{2A} receptor partial agonist
- ATC code: None

Pharmacokinetic data
- Duration of action: Unknown

Identifiers
- IUPAC name: 2-[2,5-dimethoxy-4-[(3-methoxyphenyl)methylsulfanyl]phenyl]ethanamine
- PubChem CID: 12063266

Chemical and physical data
- Formula: C_{18}H_{23}NO_{3}S
- Molar mass: 333.45 g·mol^{−1}
- 3D model (JSmol): Interactive image
- SMILES: COC1=CC=CC(=C1)CSC2=C(C=C(C(=C2)OC)CCN)OC
- InChI: InChI=1S/C18H23NO3S/c1-20-15-6-4-5-13(9-15)12-23-18-11-16(21-2)14(7-8-19)10-17(18)22-3/h4-6,9-11H,7-8,12,19H2,1-3H3; Key:ADENDGINQJWQOK-UHFFFAOYSA-N

2C-T-33, also known as 4-(3-methoxybenzylthio)-2,5-dimethoxyphenethylamine, is a serotonin receptor agonist of the phenethylamine and 2C families.

== Use and effects ==
2C-T-33 is not known to have ever been tested in humans and its active human doses have not been reported.

== Pharmacology ==
=== Pharmacodynamics ===
2C-T-33 shows high affinity for the serotonin 5-HT_{2A} receptor (K_{i} = 1.7 nM) and to a much lesser extent for the serotonin 5-HT_{2C} receptor (K_{i} = 75 nM; 44-fold lower than for 5-HT_{2A}). In terms of serotonin 5-HT_{2A} receptor activation, its EC_{50} is 26 nM and its E_{max} is 40%. Hence, 2C-T-33 acts as a low-efficacy partial agonist of the serotonin 5-HT_{2A} receptor. The drug shows higher affinity for the serotonin 5-HT_{2A} receptor but much lower potency and efficacy in activating the receptor compared to 2C-T or 2C-B (which had values of K_{i} = 6.9–49 nM, EC_{50} = 2.0–2.1 nM, and E_{max} = 75–92%). In contrast to most other 2C drugs and serotonergic psychedelics, 2C-T-33 appears to be completely inactive as an agonist of the serotonin 5-HT_{2B} receptor (EC_{50} > 10,000 nM). The drug has also been assessed at a number of other targets.

The drug did not significantly produce the head-twitch response (HTR), a behavioral proxy of psychedelic effects, in rodents, and hence may not have hallucinogenic effects in humans. Its analogue 2C-T-27 (which lacks the methoxy group on the added benzyl ring) significantly and potently induces the HTR in rodents. However, the HTR induced by 2C-T-27 is far weaker in magnitude than that induced by other 2C-T-X drugs and other serotonergic psychedelics. For example, 2C-T (or 2C-T-1) induced about 7-fold more HTR events than 2C-T-33. In contrast to the lack of assessment of 2C-T-33 in humans, 2C-T-27 has been evaluated and found to be active as a psychedelic in humans with a dose range of 80 to 130 mg.

The lack of HTR with 2C-T-33 may be due to its low-efficacy partial agonism of the serotonin 5-HT_{2A} receptor and the receptor not being activated strongly enoughly. The potencies of psychedelics in inducing the HTR are positively correlated with their efficacies in activating the serotonin 5-HT_{2A} receptor. The bulky 4 substitution of 2C-T-33 may be too large to accommodate the binding pocket of the serotonin 5-HT_{2A} receptor in terms of maintaining robust receptor activation. Similar findings have been observed for other phenethylamines with bulky 4-position substitutions, such as DOHx, DOBz, and 4-PhPr-3,5-DMA.

In addition to its potential psychoactive effects, 2C-T-33 has shown anti-inflammatory effects in animal studies similarly to other serotonin 5-HT_{2A} receptor agonists and serotonergic psychedelics. However, 2C-T-33 was the least effective assessed phenethylamine and was far less effective than other phenethylamines such as 2C-I, DOIB, 2C-B, (R)-DOI, and 2,5-DMA, among others.

== History ==
2C-T-33 was first synthesized and described by Daniel Trachsel in 2003.

== Society and culture ==
=== Legal status ===
==== Canada ====
2C-T-33 is a controlled substance in Canada under phenethylamine blanket-ban language.

== See also ==
- 2C (psychedelics)
- 2C-T-8
- 2C-T-31
- Aleph-6
- 3C-BZ
- 2C-Ph
- 2C-BI-8
