= TOET =

TOET, also known as thio-DOET or as methylthio-DOET, may refer to the following:

- 2-TOET (2-thio-DOET)
- 5-TOET (5-thio-DOET)

== See also ==
- Substituted methoxyphenethylamine
- DOx (psychedelics)
- TOM (psychedelic)
