= 2T-2CTFM-3PIP =

Clinical data
- Other names: 2T-2C-TFM-3PIP; 2-Thio-LPH-5; 2-Thio-2C-TFM-3PIP; 2C-2-TOTFM-3PIP; 3-(5-Methoxy-2-methylthio-4-(trifluoromethyl)phenyl)piperidine
- Drug class: Serotonin receptor modulator; Serotonin 5-HT_{2A} receptor agonist
- ATC code: None

Identifiers
- IUPAC name: 3-[5-methoxy-2-(methylsulfanyl)-4-(trifluoromethyl)phenyl]piperidine

Chemical and physical data
- Formula: C_{14}H_{18}F_{3}NOS
- Molar mass: 305.36 g·mol^{−1}
- 3D model (JSmol): Interactive image
- SMILES: CSc1cc(c(cc1C1CCCNC1)OC)C(F)(F)F
- InChI: InChI=1S/C14H18F3NOS/c1-19-12-6-10(9-4-3-5-18-8-9)13(20-2)7-11(12)14(15,16)17/h6-7,9,18H,3-5,8H2,1-2H3; Key:RMTQZJORMPTXEF-UHFFFAOYSA-N

2T-2CTFM-3PIP, also known as 3-(5-methoxy-2-methylthio-4-(trifluoromethyl)phenyl)piperidine or as 2-thio-LPH-5, is a serotonin receptor modulator of the phenethylamine, thio-2C, and 3-phenylpiperidine (3PIP) families related to 2C-TFM and LPH-5 ((S)-2C-TFM-3PIP). It is a cyclized phenethylamine and is the analogue of 2C-TFM in which the methoxy group at the 2 position has been replaced with a methylthio group and in which the β position has been connected to the amine to form a piperidine ring. The drug is also the analogue of LPH-5 in which the 2-methoxy group has been replaced with a 2-methylthio group.

2T-2CTFM-3PIP is a racemic mixture of (R)- and (S)- enantiomers. Both enantiomers are potent and high-efficacy serotonin 5-HT_{2A} receptor agonists. They also show less-potent serotonin 5-HT_{2B} and 5-HT_{2C} receptor agonism. The (S)- enantiomer, (S)-2T-2CTFM-3PIP, was the most potent serotonin 5-HT_{2A} receptor agonist of a large series of evaluated 3PIP derivatives. It had about 1.4- to 2.3-fold higher activational potency at the serotonin 5-HT_{2A} receptor than LPH-5. Unlike LPH-5, 2T-2CTFM-3PIP was not assessed in the head-twitch response test nor in other animal studies.

2T-2CTFM-3PIP was patented and first described in the literature by Emil Märcher-Rørsted and colleagues in association with Lophora in 2021. It is one of only a handful of thio-2Cs (as in 2- and/or 5-thio-substituted 2Cs) to have been described, with other examples including Alexander Shulgin's 2C-2-TOM (2-thio-2C-D) and 2C-5-TOET (5-thio-2C-E), which were mentioned in his 1991 book PiHKAL (Phenethylamines I Have Known and Loved) and other publications.

== See also ==
- Substituted methoxyphenethylamine
- 2C-5-TOET (5-thio-2C-E)
- 2-TOM (2-thio-DOM) and 2-TOET (2-thio-DOET)
