= 2,5-Dimethoxy-4-benzylamphetamine =

DOBz

Clinical data
- Other names: DOBz; DOBZ; DOBN; DOBn; 4-Benzyl-2,5-dimethoxyamphetamine; 2,5-Dimethoxy-4-benzylamphetamine
- Drug class: Serotonin 5-HT_{2} receptor modulator
- ATC code: None

Identifiers
- IUPAC name: 1-(4-benzyl-2,5-dimethoxyphenyl)propan-2-amine
- CAS Number: 125903-73-3
- PubChem CID: 24039384
- ChemSpider: 23108642
- ChEMBL: ChEMBL274589

Chemical and physical data
- Formula: C_{18}H_{23}NO_{2}
- Molar mass: 285.387 g·mol^{−1}
- 3D model (JSmol): Interactive image
- SMILES: CC(CC1=C(C=C(C(=C1)OC)CC2=CC=CC=C2)OC)N
- InChI: InChI=1S/C18H23NO2/c1-13(19)9-15-11-18(21-3)16(12-17(15)20-2)10-14-7-5-4-6-8-14/h4-8,11-13H,9-10,19H2,1-3H3; Key:FQARCNZVKSYIGI-UHFFFAOYSA-N

2,5-Dimethoxy-4-benzylamphetamine (DOBz or DOBN) is a serotonin 5-HT_{2} receptor modulator of the amphetamine and DOx families. It is the DOx derivative with a benzyl ring at the 4 position.

The drug's affinities (K_{i}) for the human serotonin 5-HT_{2} receptors have been found to be 0.40 nM for the serotonin 5-HT_{2A} receptor, 24.5 to 35.0 nM for the serotonin 5-HT_{2B} receptor, and 1.0 nM for the serotonin 5-HT_{2C} receptor. Its affinities for the serotonin 5-HT_{2} receptors are very similar to those of DOB. The drug has been assessed and found to act as a silent antagonist of the serotonin 5-HT_{2B} receptor (E_{max} = 0%). In rodent drug discrimination tests, DOBz neither antagonized nor generalized to the stimulus of DOM. Higher doses produced behavioral disruption however.

DOBz was first described in the scientific literature by Richard Glennon and colleagues in 1989. It is a controlled substance in Canada under phenethylamine blanket-ban language.

== See also ==
- DOx (psychedelics)
- 2C-Ph
- 4-PhPr-2,5-DMA
- 2C-T-27
- Benzscaline (BZ)
- 3C-BZ
- Phescaline
