= Desoxy (psychedelic) =

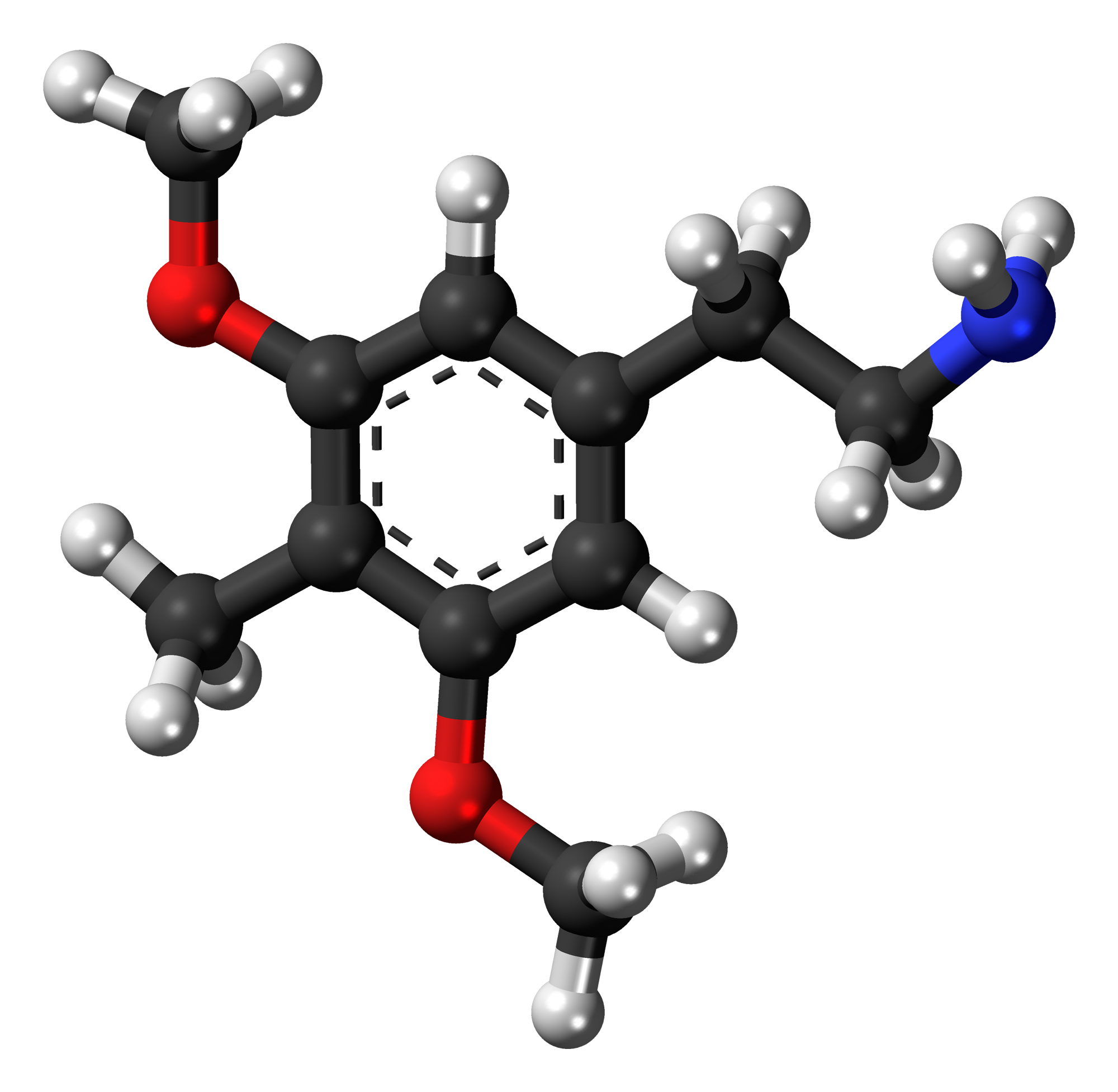

Clinical data
- Other names: DESOXY; 4-Desoxymescaline; 4-Deoxymescaline; 4-Methylmescaline; 4-Me-mescaline; 4-Methyl-3,5-dimethoxyphenethylamine; 3,5-Dimethoxy-4-methylphenethylamine; 4-Me-3,5-DMPEA
- Routes of administration: Oral
- Drug class: Serotonin receptor modulator; Serotonin 5-HT_{2A} receptor agonist; Serotonergic psychedelic; Hallucinogen
- ATC code: None

Pharmacokinetic data
- Duration of action: 6–8 hours

Identifiers
- IUPAC name: 2-(3,5-dimethoxy-4-methylphenyl)ethan-1-amine
- CAS Number: 63037-49-0
- PubChem CID: 44350128
- ChemSpider: 21106289
- UNII: 424LJJ87HT
- ChEMBL: ChEMBL127679
- CompTox Dashboard (EPA): DTXSID80658381

Chemical and physical data
- Formula: C_{11}H_{17}NO_{2}
- Molar mass: 195.262 g·mol^{−1}
- 3D model (JSmol): Interactive image
- SMILES: Cc1c(cc(cc1OC)CCN)OC
- InChI: InChI=1S/C11H17NO2/c1-8-10(13-2)6-9(4-5-12)7-11(8)14-3/h6-7H,4-5,12H2,1-3H3; Key:LLHRMWHYJGLIEV-UHFFFAOYSA-N

Desoxy, or DESOXY, also known as 4-desoxymescaline, 4-methylmescaline, or 4-methyl-3,5-dimethoxyphenethylamine (4-Me-3,5-DMPEA), is a psychedelic drug of the phenethylamine and desoxyscaline families related to mescaline (3,4,5-trimethoxyphenethylamine). It is the analogue of mescaline in which the methoxy group at the 4 position has been replaced with a methyl group, hence an oxygen has been removed and the name "desoxy". The drug is also a positional isomer of 2C-D (4-Me-2,5-DMPEA).

== Use and effects ==
In his book PiHKAL (Phenethylamines I Have Known and Loved) and other publications, Alexander Shulgin lists desoxy's dose as 40 to 120 mg orally and its duration as 6 to 8 hours. It is approximately 4-fold more potent than mescaline, which has a listed dose range of 178 to 356 mg orally as the hydrochloride salt.

The effects of desoxy have been reported to include very dream-like closed-eye imagery, noteworthy closed-eye imagery with music, no open-eye visual enhancements, auditory hallucinations, sense of strangeness and the world feeling unrecognizable and alien, feeling as if one has lost their center, sleep-like trance state while trying to sleep, preservation if not enhancement of thinking skills and conversation, very good feelings, and good and mellow mood. Other effects included chills or feeling cold, slight hints of neurological sensitivity, nausea, tachycardia, chest pressure, possible urinary retention, insomnia, and possible subsequent "spiritual crisis".

In one report, it was said that desoxy produced a "quite fascinating experience", while in another report, it was said that "there was none of the colorful psychedelic world of mescaline" but that this "might be just around the corner", "perhaps with a larger dose", with the assessed dose of 100 mg orally being a "comfortable in-between level". Higher doses than 100 mg orally were not tested. According to Shulgin, removal of an oxygen atom, as with desoxy, can radically change the nature of the effects compared to mescaline. In another publication, Shulgin stated that desoxy had an "activity that is difficult to classify".

== Pharmacology ==
=== Pharmacodynamics ===
Desoxy acts as a serotonin 5-HT_{2} receptor agonist, including of the serotonin 5-HT_{2A}, 5-HT_{2B}, and 5-HT_{2C} receptors. Its activity values (EC_{50} (E_{max})) were 513–550 nM (83–98%) at the serotonin 5-HT_{2A} receptor, 219 nM (100%) at the serotonin 5-HT_{2B} receptor, and 10.5 nM (118%) at the serotonin 5-HT_{2C} receptor. The drug has been found to possess 12-fold higher affinity for the serotonin 5-HT_{2A} receptor than mescaline (K_{0.5} = 67 nM and 801 nM, respectively). However, it had similar activational potency though higher efficacy at the receptor compared to mescaline. On the other hand, desoxy showed much greater activational potency at the serotonin 5-HT_{2B} and 5-HT_{2C} receptors than mescaline. The in-vitro pharmacodynamics of desoxy have also been further studied.

Desoxy produces the head-twitch response, a behavioral proxy of psychedelic effects, in rodents. It was about 4.4-fold more potent than mescaline in this assay and produced about 1.7-fold greater magnitude of maximal head twitches in comparison.

Desoxy has been found to induce a rage response in cats, whereas mescaline itself does not do this.

== Chemistry ==
=== Properties ===
Desoxy is said to have a sweet taste.

=== Synthesis ===
The chemical synthesis of desoxy has been described.

=== Analogues ===
Analogues of desoxy include mescaline, 4-O-desmethylmescaline (desmethyl), desoxybromoscaline (4-bromomescaline; 4-Br-3,5-DMPEA), 2C-D (4-Me-2,5-DMPEA), 4-Br-3,5-DMA, biscaline, and 3,4,5-trimethylphenethylamine (TMePEA; 3,4,5-tridesoxymescaline), among others. Daniel Trachsel has expressed great interest in desoxyscalines like desoxymescaline and desoxybromoscaline and has named and studied many of these compounds.

== History ==
Desoxy was first described in the scientific literature by F. Benington and colleagues in 1960. Subsequently, it was described in greater detail by Alexander Shulgin in his book PiHKAL (Phenethylamines I Have Known and Loved) in 1991 and other publications.

== Society and culture ==
=== Legal status ===
==== Canada ====
Desoxy is not a controlled substance in Canada as of 2025.

==== United States ====
Desoxy is not an explicitly controlled substance in the United States as of 2011. However, in 1970, the Controlled Substances Act placed mescaline into Schedule I in the United States. It is similarly controlled in other nations. Depending on whether or not it is intended for human consumption, 4-desoxymescaline could be considered an analogue of mescaline, under the Federal Analogue Act and similar bills in other countries, making it illegal to manufacture, buy, possess, or distribute without a DEA or related license. In addition, DESOXY is a positional isomer of 2C-D, which makes it a Schedule I controlled substance in the United States.

== See also ==
- Desoxyscaline
