= 2C-Ph =

Clinical data
- Other names: 2C-Phenyl; 2C-BI-1; 2,5-Dimethoxy-4-phenylphenethylamine; 4-Phenyl-2,5-dimethoxyphenethylamine
- Drug class: Serotonin receptor modulator

Identifiers
- IUPAC name: 2-(2,5-dimethoxy[1,1′-biphenyl]-4-yl)ethan-1-amine
- PubChem CID: 57474287

Chemical and physical data
- Formula: C_{16}H_{19}NO_{2}
- Molar mass: 257.333 g·mol^{−1}
- 3D model (JSmol): Interactive image
- SMILES: NCCc1cc(OC)c(cc1OC)c1ccccc1
- InChI: InChI=1S/C16H19NO2/c1-18-15-11-14(12-6-4-3-5-7-12)16(19-2)10-13(15)8-9-17/h3-7,10-11H,8-9,17H2,1-2H3; Key:RMMCNNHGPNUXOX-UHFFFAOYSA-N

2C-Ph, or 2C-Phenyl, also known as 2C-BI-1 or as 2,5-dimethoxy-4-phenylphenethylamine, is a serotonin receptor modulator of the phenethylamine and 2C families that was developed by Daniel Trachsel and David E. Nichols and colleagues.

The drug's affinity (K_{i}) for the rat serotonin 5-HT_{2A} receptor was 778 nM. It was said to be an antagonist of this receptor. In a subsequent study, 2C-Ph was a weak partial agonist of the human serotonin 5-HT_{2A} receptor (K_{i} = 630 nM, EC_{50} = 1,596 nM, E_{max} = 23%). The drug also shows affinity for the serotonin 5-HT_{1A}, 5-HT_{2B}, and 5-HT_{2C} receptors, but did not activate the serotonin 5-HT_{2B} receptor. In addition, it interacted with other monoamine receptors, with the monoamine transporters, and was a potent and high-efficacy partial agonist of the human trace amine-associated receptor 1 (TAAR1) (EC_{50} = 580 nM, E_{max} = 82%).

Besides 2C-Ph itself, a variety of derivatives of 2C-Ph with substituents on the 4-position phenyl ring have been synthesized and studied by Trachsel and colleagues. These drugs, inclusive of 2C-Ph, have been denoted 2C-BI-1 to 2C-BI-12. 2C-BI-4 (the 2′-trifluoromethyl derivative), 2C-BI-8 (the 4′-methoxy derivative), and 2C-BI-12 (the 3′,4′-dimethoxy derivative) are agonists of the human serotonin 5-HT_{2A} receptor with higher efficacy than 2C-Ph (EC_{50} = 37–2,408 nM, E_{max} = 38–44%). The effects of 2C-Ph and its derivatives in humans are unknown. However, 2C-BI-8 and 2C-BI-12 might have the potential for psychedelic effects.

2C-Ph was first described in the scientific literature, by Trachsel and Nichols and colleagues, in 2009. It is a controlled substance in Canada under phenethylamine blanket-ban language.

== See also ==
- 2C (psychedelics)
- Biscaline
- 2C-T-27
- 2C-T-33
- 4-PhPr-2,5-DMA (DOPP/DOPhPr)
- 2,5-Dimethoxy-4-benzylamphetamine (DOBz)
- Phenescaline
- Benzscaline (BZ)
- 3C-BZ
