= Benzscaline =

Clinical data
- Other names: BZ; 4-Benzyloxy-3,5-dimethoxyphenethylamine; 4-BzlO-3,5-DMPEA; 4-BnO-3,5-DMPEA
- Drug class: Serotonin receptor agonist; Possible serotonergic psychedelic

Identifiers
- IUPAC name: 2-(3,5-dimethoxy-4-phenylmethoxyphenyl)ethanamine
- CAS Number: 2176-16-1
- PubChem CID: 10613284
- ChemSpider: 8788650
- ChEMBL: ChEMBL3305858
- CompTox Dashboard (EPA): DTXSID60878207

Chemical and physical data
- Formula: C_{17}H_{21}NO_{3}
- Molar mass: 287.359 g·mol^{−1}
- 3D model (JSmol): Interactive image
- SMILES: COC1=CC(=CC(=C1OCC2=CC=CC=C2)OC)CCN
- InChI: InChI=1S/C17H21NO3/c1-19-15-10-14(8-9-18)11-16(20-2)17(15)21-12-13-6-4-3-5-7-13/h3-7,10-11H,8-9,12,18H2,1-2H3; Key:BUJBXOZJFOWVCR-UHFFFAOYSA-N

Benzscaline (BZ), also known as 4-benzyloxy-3,5-dimethoxyphenethylamine (4-BzlO-3,5-DMPEA or 4-BnO-3,5-DMPEA), is a serotonin receptor agonist and possible serotonergic psychedelic of the phenethylamine and scaline families.

== Use and effects ==
According to Alexander Shulgin in his book PiHKAL (Phenethylamines I Have Known and Loved) as well as Daniel Trachsel and colleagues, benzscaline is not known to have been tested in humans. However, it may be active as a psychedelic drug with predicted potency similar to that of proscaline (which is active at 30–60 mg orally). It is notable in this regard that the amphetamine (α-methyl) analogue of benzscaline, 3C-BZ, is active as a psychedelic with similar effects to LSD or TMA, and is said to be 9-fold more potent than mescaline but with marked interindividual variability (3C-BZ being active at 25–200 mg orally). The high interindividual variability of 3C-BZ is said to have discouraged further investigation into benzscaline. Benzscaline was reportedly eventually assayed in humans at Hyperlab and this was published in 2014.

== Pharmacology ==
=== Pharmacodynamics ===
Benzscaline is a potent serotonin 5-HT_{2A} receptor partial agonist, with an affinity (K_{i}) of 150 nM, an activational potency (EC_{50}) of 27 nM, and an efficacy (E_{max}) of 77%. Its affinity and activational potency were 63- and 370-fold more potent than those of mescaline, respectively, and it was the most potent assessed scaline. In addition, benzscaline was more efficacious in activating the receptor than mescaline (E_{max} = 56% vs. 77%, respectively). Benzscaline does not activate the serotonin 5-HT_{2B} receptor (EC_{50} = >10,000 nM), but does show affinity for the serotonin 5-HT_{2C} receptor (K_{i} = 440 nM). It also shows high affinity for the rat trace amine-associated receptor 1 (TAAR1) (K_{i} = 110 nM), but not for the mouse TAAR1 (K_{i} = 2,400 nM), and does not activate the human TAAR1 (EC_{50} = >10,000 nM). The drug does not appear to bind to the monoamine transporters (K_{i} = >7,500–9,700 nM).

== Chemistry ==
=== Synthesis ===
The chemical synthesis of benzscaline has been described.

=== Analogues ===
Analogues of benzscaline include 3C-BZ (α-methylbenzscaline), phenescaline, phescaline, 4-PhPr-3,5-DMA, 2C-T-27 (4-BnT-2,5-DMPEA), 2C-T-33, 2C-Ph, and DOBz, among others.

== History ==
Benzscaline was first patented in 1931 and was intended for therapeutic use. Subsequently, it was briefly described by Alexander Shulgin in his book PiHKAL (Phenethylamines I Have Known and Loved in 1991. The drug was detected as an analytical standard on the Cayman Chemical trading platform in March 2026, but has so far not been encountered as a novel recreational designer drug.

== Society and culture ==
=== Legal status ===
==== Canada ====
Benzscaline is not a controlled substance in Canada as of 2025.

== See also ==
- Scaline
