= Ortho-DOT =

Clinical data
- Other names: o-DOT; 4,5-Dimethoxy-2-methylthioamphetamine; 2-Methylthio-4,5-dimethoxyamphetamine; 2-Thio-TMA-2
- Routes of administration: Oral
- Drug class: Psychoactive drug
- ATC code: None

Pharmacokinetic data
- Duration of action: Unknown

Identifiers
- IUPAC name: 1-[4,5-dimethoxy-2-(methylsulfanyl)phenyl]propan-2-amine
- CAS Number: 79440-51-0
- PubChem CID: 144890
- ChemSpider: 127831
- UNII: FQL7H4OV45
- ChEMBL: ChEMBL31077
- CompTox Dashboard (EPA): DTXSID001000471

Chemical and physical data
- Formula: C_{12}H_{19}NO_{2}S
- Molar mass: 241.35 g·mol^{−1}
- 3D model (JSmol): Interactive image
- SMILES: S(c1cc(OC)c(OC)cc1CC(N)C)C
- InChI: InChI=1S/C12H19NO2S/c1-8(13)5-9-6-10(14-2)11(15-3)7-12(9)16-4/h6-8H,5,13H2,1-4H3; Key:GQUWSNDODZTHKC-UHFFFAOYSA-N

Ortho-DOT, also known as 4,5-dimethoxy-2-methylthioamphetamine or as 2-thio-TMA-2, is a psychoactive drug of the phenethylamine and amphetamine families related to TMA-2. It is the analogue of TMA-2 in which the methoxy group at the 2 position has been replaced with a methylthio group. In addition, the drug is a positional isomer of Aleph (DOT; para-DOT).

In his book PiHKAL (Phenethylamines I Have Known and Loved) and other publications, Alexander Shulgin lists ortho-DOT's dose as greater than 25 mg orally and its duration as unknown. The effects of ortho-DOT have been reported to include threshold effects, vague awareness, a feeling of an impending something, and gastrointestinal disturbance. No clear hallucinogenic effects were described. Shulgin concluded that ortho-DOT was inactive. Higher doses were not tested.

Ortho-DOT has been found to produce hyperthermia in rabbits, albeit with approximately 50-fold lower potency than DOM, though with somewhat greater potency than mescaline.

The chemical synthesis of ortho-DOT has been described. Analogues of ortho-DOT include TMA-2, Aleph (DOT; para-DOT; 4-thio-TMA-2), meta-DOT (5-thio-TMA-2), 2-TOM (2-thio-DOM), and 2-TOET (2-thio-DOET), among others.

Ortho-DOT was first described in the scientific literature by Shulgin and colleagues in 1977. Subsequently, it was described in greater detail by Shulgin in PiHKAL in 1991.

== See also ==
- Substituted methoxyphenethylamine
- DOx § Related compounds
