= TOM (drug) =

TOM, also known as thio-DOM or as methylthio-DOM, may refer to the following:

- 2-TOM (2-thio-DOM)
- 5-TOM (5-thio-DOM)

Other closely related compounds include:

- Bis-TOM (2,5-dithio-DOM)
- TOMSO (5-TOM-sulfoxide)

== See also ==
- Substituted methoxyphenethylamine
- DOx (psychedelics)
- TOET (psychedelic)
