= Meta-DOT =

Clinical data
- Other names: 5-Methylthio-2,4-dimethoxyamphetamine; 2,4-Dimethoxy-5-methylthioamphetamine; 5-Thio-TMA-2
- Routes of administration: Oral
- Drug class: Psychoactive drug
- ATC code: None

Pharmacokinetic data
- Duration of action: Unknown

Identifiers
- IUPAC name: 1-[2,4-dimethoxy-5-(methylsulfanyl)phenyl]propan-2-amine
- CAS Number: 79440-52-1
- PubChem CID: 144891
- ChemSpider: 127832
- UNII: 8A89CW1FXK
- ChEMBL: ChEMBL31787
- CompTox Dashboard (EPA): DTXSID701000472

Chemical and physical data
- Formula: C_{12}H_{19}NO_{2}S
- Molar mass: 241.35 g·mol^{−1}
- 3D model (JSmol): Interactive image
- SMILES: O(c1cc(OC)c(cc1SC)CC(N)C)C
- InChI: InChI=1S/C12H19NO2S/c1-8(13)5-9-6-12(16-4)11(15-3)7-10(9)14-2/h6-8H,5,13H2,1-4H3; Key:BEMIKIUJWHLJTP-UHFFFAOYSA-N

Meta-DOT, also known as 5-methylthio-2,4-dimethoxyamphetamine or as 5-thio-TMA-2, is a psychoactive drug of the phenethylamine and amphetamine families related to TMA-2. It is the analogue of TMA-2 in which the methoxy group at the 5 position has been replaced with a methylthio group. In addition, the drug is a positional isomer of Aleph (DOT; para-DOT).

In his book PiHKAL (Phenethylamines I Have Known and Loved) and other publications, Alexander Shulgin lists meta-DOT's dose as greater than 35 mg orally and its duration as unknown. The effects of meta-DOT have been reported to include threshold effects, a vague awareness of something or of a "thinness", and possibly some brief cardiovascular stimulation. However, the effects at tested doses were not said to be completely believable and Shulgin concluded that it was inactive. Higher doses were not tested.

Meta-DOT has been found to produce hyperthermia in rabbits, albeit with approximately 30-fold lower potency than DOM, though with somewhat greater potency than mescaline.

The chemical synthesis of meta-DOT has been described. Analogues of meta-DOT include TMA-2, Aleph (DOT; para-DOT; 4-thio-TMA-2), ortho-DOT (2-thio-TMA-2), 5-TOM (5-thio-DOM), and 5-TOET (5-thio-DOET), among others.

Meta-DOT was first described in the scientific literature by Shulgin and colleagues in 1977. Subsequently, it was described in greater detail by Shulgin in PiHKAL in 1991.

== See also ==
- Substituted methoxyphenethylamine
- DOx § Related compounds
- Meta-DOB (5-bromo-TMA-2)
