= TOMSO =

Clinical data
- Other names: 5-TOMSO; 5-TOM-sulfoxide; 2-Methoxy-4-methyl-5-methylsulfinylamphetamine
- Routes of administration: Oral
- Drug class: Serotonergic psychedelic; Hallucinogen
- ATC code: None

Pharmacokinetic data
- Duration of action: 10–16 hours

Identifiers
- IUPAC name: 1-[5-(methanesulfinyl)-2-methoxy-4-methylphenyl]propan-2-amine
- CAS Number: 757142-16-8
- PubChem CID: 15915373
- ChemSpider: 21106387
- UNII: 7SW3C48M3B
- CompTox Dashboard (EPA): DTXSID901027145

Chemical and physical data
- Formula: C_{12}H_{19}NO_{2}S
- Molar mass: 241.35 g·mol^{−1}
- 3D model (JSmol): Interactive image
- SMILES: COC1=C(C=C(C(=C1)C)S(=O)C)CC(C)N
- InChI: InChI=1S/C12H19NO2S/c1-8-5-11(15-3)10(6-9(2)13)7-12(8)16(4)14/h5,7,9H,6,13H2,1-4H3; Key:LMQLBXOYCGXTOM-UHFFFAOYSA-N

TOMSO, or 5-TOMSO, also known as 2-methoxy-4-methyl-5-methylsulfinylamphetamine, is a psychedelic drug of the phenethylamine and amphetamine families related to the DOx series. It is the analogue of DOM in which the methoxy group at the 5 position has been replaced with a sulfur-containing methylsulfinyl group.

In his book PiHKAL (Phenethylamines I Have Known and Loved), Alexander Shulgin lists TOMSO's dose as >150 mg orally alone or 100 to 150 mg orally in combination with alcohol and its duration as 10 to 16 hours. TOMSO was reported to produce no or only threshold effects by itself at the assessed doses, but when alcohol was concomitantly ingested, clear hallucinogenic effects occurred. These effects included facial distortion and remarkable time dilation, among others. When combined with alcohol, "plus-two" and "plus-three" experiences occurred on the Shulgin Rating Scale.

The chemical synthesis of TOMSO has been described.

TOMSO was first described in the scientific literature by Alexander Shulgin and Peyton Jacob III in 1983. Subsequently, it was described in greater detail by Shulgin in PiHKAL in 1991.

== See also ==
- Substituted methoxyphenethylamine
- 2-TOM, 5-TOM, and Bis-TOM
