= Desoxyscaline =

Desoxymescaline, a psychedelic drug of the desoxyscaline family.

3C-DBR (4-Br-3,5-DMA), an analgesic or tactile anesthetic of the 3C-desoxyscaline family.

A desoxyscaline, also known as a desoxygenated scaline and a type of 4-substituted 3,5-dimethoxyphenethylamine, is an analogue of the phenethylamine psychedelic drug mescaline in which the methoxy group at the 4 position has been replaced with a non-alkoxy substituent (e.g., an alkyl, halo, or other substituent). They are desoxygenated analogues of the scalines like mescaline and are also positional isomers of the 2C psychedelics. Major examples of desoxyscalines include desoxymescaline ("desoxy" or 4-methylmescaline), a positional isomer of 2C-D, and desoxybromoscaline (4-bromomescaline), a positional isomer of 2C-B. 3C-Desoxyscalines, for instance 3C-DBR (4-Br-3,5-DMA), which is a positional isomer of DOB, are the amphetamine (3C) derivatives of the desoxyscalines.

In contrast to the scalines and 2Cs, the desoxyscalines and 3C-desoxyscalines have been very little-explored. Alexander Shulgin reported in his 1991 book PiHKAL (Phenethylamines I Have Known and Loved) that desoxymescaline is active as a psychedelic drug in humans, with several-fold greater potency than mescaline, but with lighter as well as distinct hallucinogenic effects, at least at the doses tested. Desoxybromoscaline was also mentioned, but was not tested. However, its amphetamine analogue, 3C-DBR (4-Br-3,5-DMA), was found to produce unusual effects including analgesia and tactile anesthesia among others, but induced no clear hallucinogenic effects. These effects occurred at relatively low doses, with higher doses not being tested.

Other desoxyscalines and 3C-desoxyscalines besides the preceding compounds have largely not been explored. However, Daniel Trachsel and colleagues named many additional desoxyscalines in their 2013 book Phenethylamine: von der Struktur zur Funktion (Phenethylamines: From Structure to Function) and expressed that this structural scaffold would be an exciting area of investigation. Subsequently, Trachsel and Matthias Liechti and colleagues, in association with Mind Medicine (now Definium Therapeutics), defined more compounds of this family in a 2023 patent, and showed that many of them are potent serotonin 5-HT_{2A} receptor agonists with the potential for activity as psychedelic drugs. Andrew Kruegel in association with Gilgamesh Pharmaceuticals has also patented and described a few compounds of this group.

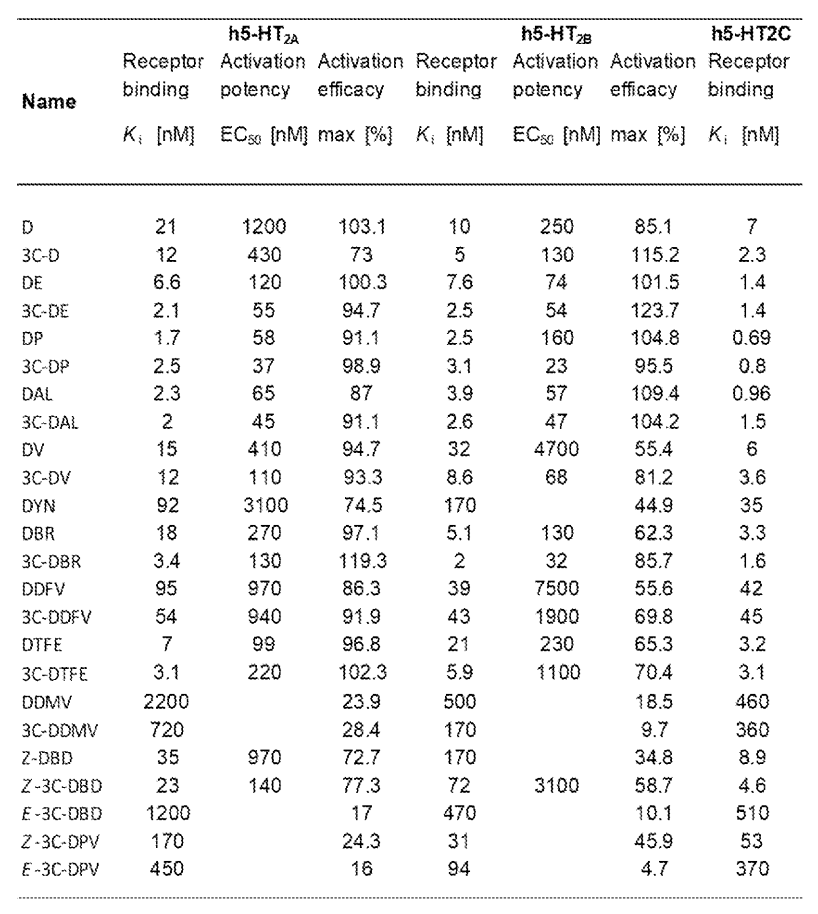
Serotonin 5-HT_{2} receptor interactions of desoxyscalines and 3C-desoxyscalines.

== List of desoxyscalines ==
=== Phenethylamines (desoxyscalines) ===
- Desoxymescaline (D; DESOXY; 4-methylmescaline; 4-methyl-3,5-dimethoxyphenethylamine)
- Desoxyescaline (DE; 4-ethylmescaline; 4-ethyl-3,5-dimethoxyphenethylamine)
- Desoxyproscaline (DP; 4-propylmescaline; 4-propyl-3,5-dimethoxyphenethylamine)
- Desoxyisoproscaline (DIP; 4-isopropylmescaline; 4-isopropyl-3,5-dimethoxyphenethylamine)
- Desoxyallylescaline (DAL; 4-allylmescaline; 4-allyl-3,5-dimethoxyphenethylamine)
- Desoxymethallylescaline (DMAL; 4-methallylmescaline; 4-methallyl-3,5-dimethoxyphenethylamine)
- Desoxyvinylscaline (DV; 4-vinylmescaline; 4-vinyl-3,5-dimethoxyphenethylamine)
- Desoxyethynylscaline (DYN; 4-ethynylmescaline; 4-ethynyl-3,5-dimethoxyphenethylamine)
- Desoxybromoscaline (DBR; 4-bromomescaline; 4-bromo-3,5-dimethoxyphenethylamine)
- Desoxydifluorovinylscaline (DDFV; 4-(2,2-difluorovinyl)mescaline; 4-(2,2-difluorovinyl)-3,5-dimethoxyphenethylamine)
- Desoxytrifluoromescaline (DTFM; 4-(trifluoromethyl)mescaline; 4-(trifluoromethyl)-3,5-dimethoxyphenethylamine)
- Desoxytrifluoroescaline (DTFE; 4-(2,2,2-trifluoroethyl)mescaline; 4-(2,2,2-trifluoroethyl)-3,5-dimethoxyphenethylamine)
- Desoxydimethylvinylscaline (DDMV; 4-(2,2-dimethylvinyl)mescaline; 4-(2,2-dimethylvinyl)-3,5-dimethoxyphenethylamine)
- Desoxybutadienylscaline (DBD; 4-(buta-1,3-dienyl)mescaline; 4-(buta-1,3-dienyl)-3,5-dimethoxyphenethylamine)
- Biscaline (4-phenylmescaline; 4-phenyl-3,5-dimethoxyphenethylamine)
Chemical structures of desoxyscalines
Desoxymescaline (D)

Desoxyescaline (DE)

Desoxyproscaline (DP)

Desoxyisoproscaline (DIP)

Desoxyallylescaline (DAL)

Desoxymethallylescaline (DMAL)

Desoxyvinylscaline (DV)

Desoxyethynylscaline (DYN)

Desoxybromoscaline (DBR)

Desoxydifluorovinylscaline (DDFV)

Desoxytrifluoromescaline (DTFM)

Desoxytrifluoroescaline (DTFE)

Desoxydimethylvinylscaline (DDMV)

E-Desoxybutadienylscaline (E-DBD)

Z-Desoxybutadienylscaline (Z-DBD)

Biscaline

=== Amphetamines (3C-desoxyscalines) ===
- 3C-D (3C-desoxymescaline; 4-methyl-3,5-dimethoxyamphetamine)
- 3C-DE (3C-desoxyescaline; 4-ethyl-3,5-dimethoxyamphetamine)
- 3C-DP (3C-desoxyproscaline; 4-propyl-3,5-dimethoxyamphetamine)
- 3C-DAL (3C-desoxyallylescaline; 4-allyl-3,5-dimethoxyamphetamine)
- 3C-DV (3C-desoxyvinylscaline; 4-vinyl-3,5-dimethoxyamphetamine)
- 3C-DBR (3C-desoxybromoscaline; 4-bromo-3,5-dimethoxyamphetamine)
- 4-I-3,5-DMA (3C-desoxyiodoscaline; 4-iodo-3,5-dimethoxyamphetamine)
- 3C-DDFV (3C-desoxydifluorovinylscaline; 4-(2,2-difluorovinyl)-3,5-dimethoxyamphetamine)
- 3C-DTFE (3C-desoxytrifluoroescaline; 4-(2,2,2-trifluoroethyl)-3,5-dimethoxyamphetamine)
- 3C-DDMV (3C-desoxydimethylvinylscaline; 4-(2,2-dimethylvinyl)-3,5-dimethoxyamphetamine)
- 3C-DBD (3C-desoxybutadienylscaline; 4-(buta-1,3-dienyl)-3,5-dimethoxyamphetamine)
- 3C-DPV (3C-desoxyphenylvinylscaline; 4-(2-phenylvinyl)-3,5-dimethoxyamphetamine)
- 4-PhPr-3,5-DMA (4-(3-phenylpropyl)-3,5-dimethoxyamphetamine)
Chemical structures of 3C-desoxyscalines
3C-D

3C-DE

3C-DP

3C-DAL

3C-DV

3C-DBR (4-Br-3,5-DMA)

4-I-3,5-DMA

3C-DDFV

3C-DTFE

3C-DDMV

E-3C-DBD

Z-3C-DBD

E-3C-DPV

Z-3C-DPV

4-PhPr-3,5-DMA

== See also ==
- Substituted methoxyphenethylamine
- Scaline, 3C, 2C, DOx
