= Phescaline =

Clinical data
- Other names: PH; 4-Phenoxy-3,5-dimethoxyphenethylamine; 3,5-Dimethoxy-4-phenoxyphenethylamine
- Routes of administration: Unknown
- ATC code: None

Identifiers
- IUPAC name: 2-(3,5-dimethoxy-4-phenoxyphenyl)ethan-1-amine

Chemical and physical data
- Formula: C_{16}H_{19}NO_{3}
- Molar mass: 273.332 g·mol^{−1}
- 3D model (JSmol): Interactive image
- SMILES: COC1=C(OC2=CC=CC=C2)C(OC)=CC(CCN)=C1
- InChI: InChI=1S/C16H19NO3/c1-18-14-10-12(8-9-17)11-15(19-2)16(14)20-13-6-4-3-5-7-13/h3-7,10-11H,8-9,17H2,1-2H3; Key:MAHNMYPOELXFNS-UHFFFAOYSA-N

Phescaline (PH), also known as 4-phenoxy-3,5-dimethoxyphenethylamine, is a chemical compound of the phenethylamine and scaline families related to the psychedelic drug mescaline. It is the derivative of mescaline in which the methoxy group at the 4 position has been replaced with a phenoxy group.

According to Daniel Trachsel and colleagues in their book Phenethylamine: von der Struktur zur Funktion, phescaline is not known to have been synthesized, studied, or tested in humans. However, analogues of phescaline like benzscaline (BZ) and 3C-BZ are known to be potent serotonin 5-HT_{2A} receptor agonists and/or psychedelics, and phescaline may be active as a psychedelic similarly. On the other hand, the longer-chain analogue phenescaline was found to have little activity in humans at tested doses.

Phescaline was first described in the literature by Trachsel and colleagues in Phenethylamine: von der Struktur zur Funktion in 2013.

== See also ==
- Scaline
