= Desoxybromoscaline =

Clinical data
- Other names: DBR; 4-Bromomescaline; 3,5-Dimethoxy-4-bromophenethylamine; 4-Bromo-3,5-dimethoxyphenethylamine; 4-Br-3,5-DMPEA; 3,4,5-MBM
- Routes of administration: Unknown
- Drug class: Serotonin receptor modulator; Serotonin 5-HT_{2A} receptor agonist
- ATC code: None

Pharmacokinetic data
- Duration of action: Unknown

Identifiers
- IUPAC name: 2-(4-bromo-3,5-dimethoxyphenyl)ethanamine
- CAS Number: 61367-72-4
- PubChem CID: 15102778
- ChemSpider: 10438341
- ChEMBL: ChEMBL3305574
- CompTox Dashboard (EPA): DTXSID50876055

Chemical and physical data
- Formula: C_{10}H_{14}BrNO_{2}
- Molar mass: 260.131 g·mol^{−1}
- 3D model (JSmol): Interactive image
- SMILES: COC1=CC(=CC(=C1Br)OC)CCN
- InChI: InChI=1S/C10H14BrNO2/c1-13-8-5-7(3-4-12)6-9(14-2)10(8)11/h5-6H,3-4,12H2,1-2H3; Key:DQTTUBZTFBEBCK-UHFFFAOYSA-N

Desoxybromoscaline (DBR), also known as 4-bromo-3,5-dimethoxyphenethylamine (4-Br-3,5-DMPEA) or as 4-bromomescaline, is a serotonin receptor modulator of the phenethylamine and desoxyscaline families related to the psychedelic drug mescaline. It is the analogue of mescaline in which the methoxy group at the 4 position has been replaced with a bromine atom. The drug is also the phenethylamine (α-desmethyl) analogue of 4-Br-3,5-DMA and a positional isomer of 2C-B (4-Br-2,5-DMPEA).

== Use and effects ==
In his book PiHKAL (Phenethylamines I Have Known and Loved), Alexander Shulgin briefly mentions desoxybromoscaline and states that it has never been tested in humans. As such, its properties and effects in humans are unknown.

== Pharmacology ==
=== Pharmacodynamics ===
Desoxybromoscaline has been found to be a potent serotonin receptor agonist in the sheep umbilical artery (EC_{50} = 185 nM). It was 7.6-fold more potent than mescaline in this assay. In a subsequent study, the drug showed high affinity for the serotonin 5-HT_{2A} receptor (K_{0.5} = 45 nM). Its affinity for this receptor was approximately 18-fold higher than that of mescaline. Later on, the activities of desoxybromoscaline have been further described, with it showing affinity for all three serotonin 5-HT_{2} receptors and acting as a full agonist of the serotonin 5-HT_{2A} receptor and as a partial agonist of the serotonin 5-HT_{2B} receptor.

== Chemistry ==
=== Synthesis ===
The chemical synthesis of desoxybromoscaline has been described.

=== Analogues ===
Analogues of desoxybromoscaline include mescaline, desoxy (desoxymescaline; 4-desoxymescaline; 4-methylmescaline; 4-Me-3,5-DMPEA), 4-O-desmethylmescaline (desmethyl; 4-hydroxymescaline; 4-OH-3,5-DMPEA), 2C-B (4-Br-2,5-DMPEA), and 4-Br-3,5-DMA, among others. 4-Br-3,5-DMA has been found to be a potent psychoactive drug in humans, though it did not produce clear hallucinogenic effects at tested doses of 3 to 10 mg orally and instead produced pronounced analgesic and tactile anesthetic effects among others. On the other hand, desoxy (4-methylmescaline), a positional isomer of 2C-D, is a psychedelic drug similarly to mescaline at doses of 40 to 120 mg orally, albeit with distinct effects. Daniel Trachsel has expressed great interest in desoxyscalines like desoxymescaline and desoxybromoscaline and has named and studied many of these compounds.

== History ==
Desoxybromoscaline was first described in the scientific literature by David E. Nichols and Alexander Shulgin and colleagues in 1977. Subsequently, it was described by Shulgin in his book PiHKAL (Phenethylamines I Have Known and Loved) in 1991.

== Society and culture ==
=== Legal status ===
==== Canada ====
Desoxybromoscaline is not a controlled substance in Canada as of 2025.

==== United States ====
Desoxybromoscaline is not an explicitly controlled substance in the United States. However, it could be considered a controlled substance under the Federal Analogue Act if intended for human consumption.

== See also ==
- Desoxyscaline
- 3C-DBR (4-Br-3,5-DMA)
