= 4-PhPr-2,5-DMA =

Clinical data
- Other names: 4-(3-Phenylpropyl)-2,5-dimethoxyamphetamine; 2,5-Dimethoxy-4-(3-phenylpropyl)amphetamine; 4-PP-2,5-DMA; DOPP; DOPhPr; DOPh3
- Routes of administration: Unknown
- Drug class: Serotonin receptor modulator; Serotonin 5-HT_{2A} receptor partial agonist
- ATC code: None

Pharmacokinetic data
- Duration of action: Unknown

Identifiers
- IUPAC name: 1-[2,5-dimethoxy-4-(3-phenylpropyl)phenyl]propan-2-amine
- PubChem CID: 44265227
- ChemSpider: 23108650
- ChEMBL: ChEMBL8334

Chemical and physical data
- Formula: C_{20}H_{27}NO_{2}
- Molar mass: 313.441 g·mol^{−1}
- 3D model (JSmol): Interactive image
- SMILES: CC(CC1=C(C=C(C(=C1)OC)CCCC2=CC=CC=C2)OC)N
- InChI: InChI=1S/C20H27NO2/c1-15(21)12-18-14-19(22-2)17(13-20(18)23-3)11-7-10-16-8-5-4-6-9-16/h4-6,8-9,13-15H,7,10-12,21H2,1-3H3; Key:XKCYCNKOOGOHIQ-UHFFFAOYSA-N

4-(3-Phenylpropyl)-2,5-dimethoxyamphetamine (DOPP or DOPhPr), also known as 4-PhPr-2,5-DMA, is a serotonin receptor modulator of the phenethylamine, amphetamine, and DOx families. The properties and effects of 4-PhPr-2,5-DMA in humans do not appear to be known. It shows high affinity for both the serotonin 5-HT_{2A} and 5-HT_{2C} receptors and acts as a weak partial agonist or antagonist of the serotonin 5-HT_{2A} receptor. The drug has lower affinity for the serotonin 5-HT_{2A} receptor than its closely related positional isomer 4-PhPr-3,5-DMA. This is an apparent reversal of the usual situation with DOx and related drugs, in which the 2,5-dimethoxy pattern is optimal for serotonin 5-HT_{2A} receptor interactions. 4-PhPhr-2,5-DMA was first described in the scientific literature by Richard Glennon and colleagues by 1989.

== See also ==
- DOx (psychedelics)
- DOBz
- 2C-T-27
- 2C-Ph
- DOHx
- 4-PhPr-PEA
