= 2C-5-TOET =

Clinical data
- Other names: 5-Thio-2C-E; 5T-2C-E; 4-Ethyl-2-methoxy-5-methylthiophenethylamine; 2-Methoxy-4-ethyl-5-methylthiophenethylamine
- ATC code: None

Identifiers
- IUPAC name: 2-(4-ethyl-2-methoxy-5-methylsulfanylphenyl)ethanamine
- PubChem CID: 15915366
- ChemSpider: 45598234

Chemical and physical data
- Formula: C_{12}H_{19}NOS
- Molar mass: 225.35 g·mol^{−1}
- 3D model (JSmol): Interactive image
- SMILES: CCC1=CC(=C(C=C1SC)CCN)OC
- InChI: InChI=1S/C12H19NOS/c1-4-9-7-11(14-2)10(5-6-13)8-12(9)15-3/h7-8H,4-6,13H2,1-3H3; Key:NMFLGCDBOWGERA-UHFFFAOYSA-N

2C-5-TOET, also known as 2-methoxy-4-ethyl-5-methylthiophenethylamine or as 5-thio-2C-E, is a chemical compound and possible psychedelic drug of the phenethylamine and thio-2C families related to the psychedelics 2C-E and 5-TOET (5-thio-DOET). It is the analogue of 2C-E in which the methoxy group at the 5 position has been replaced with a methylthio group. In addition, the compound is the phenethylamine (i.e., α-desmethyl) analogue of 5-TOET (the 5-methylthio analogue of DOET).

2C-5-TOET was first described in the scientific literature by Alexander Shulgin and Peyton Jacob III in 1983. Subsequently, it was also described by Shulgin in his 1991 book PiHKAL (Phenethylamines I Have Known and Loved). However, he only synthesized the compound and did not test it. As such, its properties and effects are unknown. The related drug 5-TOET is known to be robustly active as a psychedelic but to be about 5-fold less potent than DOET. The chemical synthesis of 2C-5-TOET has been described. Other related compounds include 2C-2-TOM (2-thio-DOM), 2C-5-TOM (5-thio-DOM), and 2C-2-TOET (2-thio-DOET).

2C-5-TOET and/or precursors or intermediates have reportedly been encountered as novel designer drugs. Similarly, 2C-2-TOM and 2C-2-TOET have reportedly been encountered as designer drugs. Thio-2Cs like 2C-5-TOET are not controlled substances in Canada as of 2025.

== See also ==
- Substituted methoxyphenethylamine
- 2-TOET (2-thio-DOET) and 5-TOET (5-thio-DOET)
- 2T-2CTFM-3PIP (2-thio-LPH-5)
