= 2C-T-31 =

Clinical data
- Other names: 2,5-Dimethoxy-4-(4-trifluoromethylbenzylthio)phenethylamine; 4-(4-Trifluoromethylbenzylthio)-2,5-dimethoxyphenethylamine
- Drug class: Serotonin receptor modulator; Serotonin 5-HT_{2A} receptor very weak partial agonist or antagonist
- ATC code: None

Identifiers
- IUPAC name: 2-[2,5-dimethoxy-4-({[4-(trifluoromethyl)phenyl]methyl}sulfanyl)phenyl]ethan-1-amine
- PubChem CID: 12063264

Chemical and physical data
- Formula: C_{18}H_{20}F_{3}NO_{2}S
- Molar mass: 371.42 g·mol^{−1}
- 3D model (JSmol): Interactive image
- SMILES: FC(F)(F)C1=CC=C(CSC(C(OC)=C2)=CC(OC)=C2CCN)C=C1
- InChI: InChI=1S/C18H20F3NO2S/c1-23-15-10-17(16(24-2)9-13(15)7-8-22)25-11-12-3-5-14(6-4-12)18(19,20)21/h3-6,9-10H,7-8,11,22H2,1-2H3; Key:BDOJPUSYOLIGBS-UHFFFAOYSA-N

2C-T-31, also known as 2,5-dimethoxy-4-(4-trifluoromethylbenzylthio)phenethylamine, is a serotonin receptor modulator of the phenethylamine and 2C families. Its properties and effects in humans do not appear to be known. The drug shows affinity for the serotonin 5-HT_{2A} receptor (K_{i} = 3.8–28 nM) and much lower affinity for the serotonin 5-HT_{1A} and 5-HT_{2C} receptors (K_{i} = 1,063 nM and 157 nM, respectively). It is a very weak partial agonist or antagonist of the serotonin 5-HT_{2A} receptor (EC_{50} (E_{max}) = 53 nM (2.8%)) and a moderate-efficacy but very-low-potency partial agonist of the serotonin 5-HT_{2B} receptor (EC_{50} (E_{max}) = 3,309 nM (44%)). It also shows weak affinity for a number of other targets. The chemical synthesis of 2C-T-31 has been described. 2C-T-31 was first described in the scientific literature by Daniel Trachsel in 2003.

== See also ==
- 2C (psychedelics)
- 2C-T-27 and 2C-T-33
