= 4-PhPr-PEA =

Clinical data
- Other names: 4-(3-Phenylpropyl)phenethylamine; 4-PhPr-PEA; 4-PPPEA
- Drug class: Serotonin receptor modulator; Serotonin 5-HT_{2A} and 5-HT_{2C} receptor modulator
- ATC code: None

Identifiers
- IUPAC name: 2-[4-(3-phenylpropyl)phenyl]ethanamine
- PubChem CID: 10657642
- ChemSpider: 8832997
- ChEMBL: ChEMBL104088

Chemical and physical data
- Formula: C_{17}H_{21}N
- Molar mass: 239.362 g·mol^{−1}
- 3D model (JSmol): Interactive image
- SMILES: C1=CC=C(C=C1)CCCC2=CC=C(C=C2)CCN
- InChI: InChI=1S/C17H21N/c18-14-13-17-11-9-16(10-12-17)8-4-7-15-5-2-1-3-6-15/h1-3,5-6,9-12H,4,7-8,13-14,18H2; Key:YMVIIWYVJUTVGJ-UHFFFAOYSA-N

4-Phenylpropylphenethylamine (4-PhPr-PEA or 4-PPPEA), is a serotonin receptor modulator of the phenethylamine family related to phenethylamine (PEA). It is the 4-(3-phenylpropyl) derivative of phenethylamine. The drug shows relatively high affinity for the serotonin 5-HT_{2A} and 5-HT_{2C} receptors (K_{i} = 60 nM and 525 nM, respectively). Its affinity for the serotonin 5-HT_{2A} receptor was 280-fold higher than that of phenethylamine (which was K_{i} = 16,800 nM). 4-PhPr-PEA was not specifically assessed itself, but analogues were tested, and based on the results with them, the drug is assumed to act as an antagonist or low-efficacy partial agonist of the serotonin 5-HT_{2A} receptor. 4-PhPr-PEA is notable as it indicates that methoxy groups on the phenyl ring of phenethylamine alkaloids are not required for high affinity binding to serotonin receptors, though they do appear to be required for efficacious agonism (e.g Mescaline). The drug was first described in the scientific literature by Richard Glennon and colleagues in 2000.

== See also ==
- Substituted phenethylamine
- Serotonin 5-HT_{2A} receptor antagonist
- 4-PhPr-2,5-DMA (DOPP or DOPhPr)
- 4-PhPr-3,5-DMA
- 9-Aminomethyl-9,10-dihydroanthracene (AMDA)
- XOB (ASR-6001)
- PEA-NBOMe
