= 4-Bromo-3,5-dimethoxyamphetamine =

4-Br-3,5-DMA

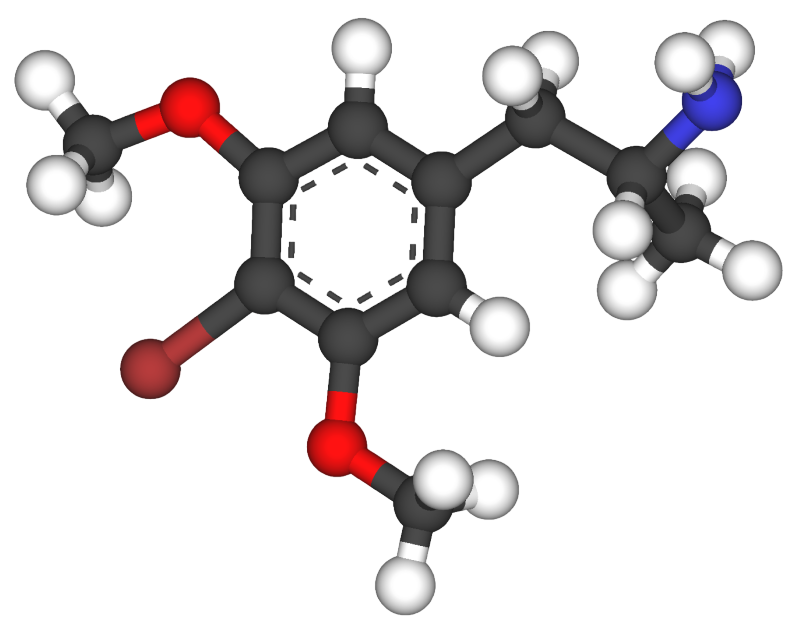

Clinical data
- Other names: 4-Bromo-3,5-dimethoxyamphetamine; 3,5-Dimethoxy-4-bromoamphetamine; 4,3,5-DOB; 3C-DBR; 4-Bromo-TMA; 4-Bromo-3,4,5-TMA
- Routes of administration: Oral
- Drug class: Serotonin receptor modulator; Psychoactive drug; Analgesic; Tactile anesthetic
- ATC code: None

Pharmacokinetic data
- Duration of action: 8–12 hours

Identifiers
- IUPAC name: 1-(4-bromo-3,5-dimethoxyphenyl)propan-2-amine
- CAS Number: 32156-34-6
- PubChem CID: 208044
- ChemSpider: 180279
- UNII: 5BN3H3UZ8R
- ChEMBL: ChEMBL104362
- CompTox Dashboard (EPA): DTXSID30276857

Chemical and physical data
- Formula: C_{11}H_{16}BrNO_{2}
- Molar mass: 274.158 g·mol^{−1}
- 3D model (JSmol): Interactive image
- SMILES: C1=C(C(=C(C=C1CC(C)N)OC)Br)OC
- InChI: InChI=1S/C11H16BrNO2/c1-7(13)4-8-5-9(14-2)11(12)10(6-8)15-3/h5-7H,4,13H2,1-3H3; Key:FAVLJTSHWBEOMA-UHFFFAOYSA-N

4-Br-3,5-DMA, also known as 4-bromo-3,5-dimethoxyamphetamine, 3C-DBR, or 4-bromo-TMA, is a psychoactive drug of the phenethylamine, amphetamine, and 3C-desoxyscaline families related to mescaline. It is the analogue of TMA in which the methoxy group at the 4 position has been replaced with a bromine atom. In addition, 4-Br-3,5-DMA is a positional isomer of DOB with the methoxy group at the 2 position located instead at the 3 position.

== Use and effects ==
In his book PiHKAL (Phenethylamines I Have Known and Loved) and other publications, Alexander Shulgin lists 4-Br-3,5-DMA's dose range as 4 to 10 mg orally and its duration as 8 to 12 hours. In earlier publications, the dose range was listed as 3 to 6 mg orally and was described as producing threshold effects. The effects of 4-Br-3,5-DMA have been reported to include very shallow threshold effects to a "plus-two" on the Shulgin Rating Scale depending on dose, very little if any sensory distortion, pronounced analgesia or tactile anesthesia and numbing of the skin and extremities, and teeth rubbiness. Although it produces both mental and physical effects, there were no clear hallucinogenic or visual effects at tested doses. Shulgin said that it is a "remarkably effective anesthetic to skin surfaces" taken systemically at his listed doses and suggested that it might be a "narcotic" rather than a psychedelic.

== Pharmacology ==
=== Pharmacodynamics ===
4-Br-3,5-DMA shows affinity for the serotonin 5-HT_{2A} and 5-HT_{2C} receptors (K_{i} = 210 nM and 570 nM, respectively). Its affinities for these receptors were approximately 7-fold and 9-fold lower than those of DOB, respectively. The in-vitro pharmacodynamics of 4-Br-3,5-DMA have also been further studied. Although 4-Br-3,5-DMA produced analgesic effects in humans, this could not subsequently be confirmed in thorough animal studies, at least in rodents.

== Chemistry ==
=== Synthesis ===
The chemical synthesis of 4-Br-3,5-DMA has been described.

=== Analogues ===
Analogues of 4-Br-3,5-DMA include mescaline and other scalines, TMA and other 3C-scalines, DOB (4-Br-2,5-DMA), meta-DOB (5-Br-2,4-DMA), and 3-DOB (3-Br-2,5-DMA; iso-DOB), among others.

== History ==
4-Br-3,5-DMA was first described in the scientific literature by David E. Nichols and colleagues in 1971. Subsequently, it was described in greater detail by Alexander Shulgin in PiHKAL (Phenethylamines I Have Known and Loved) in 1991.

== See also ==
- Desoxyscaline
- 3C (psychedelics)
- 3,5-Dimethoxyamphetamine (3,5-DMA)
- Desoxybromoscaline (4-bromomescaline; 4-Br-3,5-DMPEA)
