= Aleph-7 =

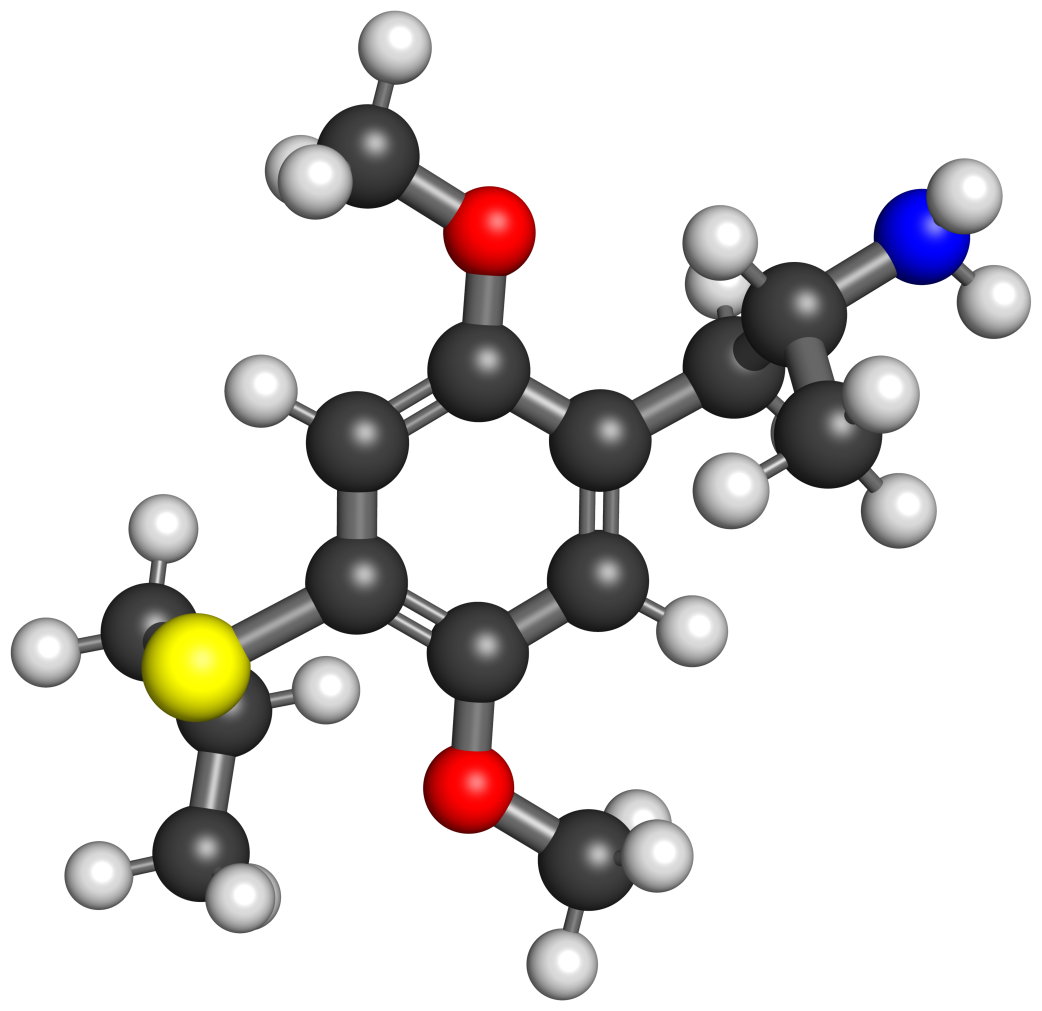

Clinical data
- Other names: ALEPH-7; DOT-7; 4-Propylthio-2,5-dimethoxyamphetamine; 2,5-Dimethoxy-4-propylthioamphetamine; 4-PrS-DMA
- Routes of administration: Oral
- Drug class: Serotonin receptor modulator; Serotonin 5-HT_{2A} receptor agonist; Serotonergic psychedelic; Hallucinogen; Monoamine oxidase inhibitor; Reversible inhibitor of MAO-A
- ATC code: None

Pharmacokinetic data
- Duration of action: 15–30 hours

Identifiers
- IUPAC name: 1-(2,5-dimethoxy-4-propylsulfanylphenyl)propan-2-amine
- CAS Number: 207740-16-7
- PubChem CID: 11197521
- ChemSpider: 9372590
- UNII: RB42O7HM6C
- ChEMBL: ChEMBL341318
- CompTox Dashboard (EPA): DTXSID901043214

Chemical and physical data
- Formula: C_{14}H_{23}NO_{2}S
- Molar mass: 269.40 g·mol^{−1}
- 3D model (JSmol): Interactive image
- SMILES: CCCSC1=C(C=C(C(=C1)OC)CC(C)N)OC
- InChI: InChI=1S/C14H23NO2S/c1-5-6-18-14-9-12(16-3)11(7-10(2)15)8-13(14)17-4/h8-10H,5-7,15H2,1-4H3; Key:XHWDHFUBCVWXDZ-UHFFFAOYSA-N

Aleph-7, or ALEPH-7, also known as 4-propylthio-2,5-dimethoxyamphetamine, is a psychedelic drug of the phenethylamine, amphetamine, and DOx families. It is one of the Aleph series of compounds.

In his book PiHKAL (Phenethylamines I Have Known and Loved), Alexander Shulgin lists Aleph-7's dose as 4 to 7 mg orally and its duration as 15 to 30 hours. The effects of Aleph-7 have been reported to include strangeness, slight visual changes, intense but difficult to describe altered states of consciousness, everything feeling "preprogrammed", emotional changes, negative reactions, unwillingness to take the drug again, relaxation, and paresthesia, among others. It was said to produce a "Beth state", defined as a state of uncaring, anhedonia, and emotionlesssness. Many other drugs are also said to have a touch of such a state, but Aleph-7 to have more of it than most.

It is a potent agonist of the serotonin 5-HT_{2A} receptor, with an EC_{50} of 2.2 to 7.6 nM and an E_{max} of 116 to 189%. The drug is also a weak monoamine oxidase inhibitor (MAOI), specifically a reversible inhibitor of MAO-A (RIMA), with an IC_{50} of 2.4 μM.

The chemical synthesis of Aleph-7 has been described.

Aleph-7 was first described in the scientific literature by Shulgin in 1981. Subsequently, it was described in greater detail by Shulgin PiHKAL in 1991. The drug was encountered as a novel designer drug in Europe in 2005. It is a controlled substance in Canada under phenethylamine blanket-ban language.

== See also ==
- DOx (psychedelics)
- Aleph (psychedelics)
- 2C-T-7
