= Phenescaline =

Clinical data
- Other names: 3,5-Dimethoxy-4-phenylethoxyphenethylamine; 4-Phenylethoxy-3,5-dimethoxyphenethylamine
- Routes of administration: Oral
- Drug class: Serotonin receptor modulator; Psychoactive drug
- ATC code: None

Pharmacokinetic data
- Duration of action: Unknown

Identifiers
- IUPAC name: 2-[3,5-dimethoxy-4-(2-phenylethoxy)phenyl]ethan-1-amine
- CAS Number: 207740-42-9
- PubChem CID: 44567543
- ChemSpider: 21106364
- UNII: U7NN1HPH0Z
- ChEMBL: ChEMBL465866
- CompTox Dashboard (EPA): DTXSID00659517

Chemical and physical data
- Formula: C_{18}H_{32}NO_{3}
- Molar mass: 310.458 g·mol^{−1}
- 3D model (JSmol): Interactive image
- SMILES: COc2cc(cc(OC)c2OCCc1ccccc1)CCN
- InChI: InChI=1S/C18H23NO3/c1-20-16-12-15(8-10-19)13-17(21-2)18(16)22-11-9-14-6-4-3-5-7-14/h3-7,12-13H,8-11,19H2,1-2H3; Key:FKXBCTFKCKEDNI-UHFFFAOYSA-N

Phenescaline, also known as 3,5-dimethoxy-4-phenylethoxyphenethylamine, is a psychoactive drug of the phenethylamine and scaline families related to mescaline. It is the derivative of mescaline in which the methoxy group at the 4 position has been replaced with a phenylethoxy group. In his book PiHKAL (Phenethylamines I Have Known and Loved), Alexander Shulgin lists phenescaline's dose as greater than 150 mg orally and its duration as unknown. The effects of phenescaline have been reported to include threshold effects and a vague unreal feeling as if one had not had enough sleep. The drug shows affinity for the serotonin 5-HT_{2A} receptor (K_{i} = 59 nM). The chemical synthesis of phenescaline has been described. Phenescaline was first described in the literature by Shulgin in PiHKAL in 1991.

== See also ==
- Scaline
- 4-PhPr-3,5-DMA
- Benzscaline
- Phescaline
