= Cayman Chemical Company =

American biotechnology company

- Founded: 1980; 46 years ago
- Headquarters: 1180 E. Ellsworth; Ann Arbor, Michigan; United States
- Key people: Kirk M. Maxey (President & CEO)
- Revenue: $47 million
- Number of employees: 400+
- Subsidiaries: Cayman Pharma; Cayman Europe; Matreya LLC
- Website: www.caymanchem.com

Cayman Chemical Company is an American biotechnology company founded in 1980, headquartered in Ann Arbor, Michigan. The company provides chemicals that are used primarily by universities and pharmaceutical companies for research and the development of medicines. The company is also known as a provider of reference standards to state and federal crime labs for use in the detection of rapidly evolving designer drugs. Small quantities of these known reference standards are analyzed using mass spectrometry and gas chromatography techniques to match against forensic evidence, usually confiscated by law enforcement, or forensic toxicological evidence collected in the form of biological samples such as urine, blood, or tissue.

== History ==
Cayman Chemical Company was incorporated on June 6, 1980, in Denver, Colorado. It was initially a marine natural products company. Building on earlier environmental studies in the North Sound of Grand Cayman Island, Cayman initially sold prostaglandin standards as research chemicals. The company operated in Denver for several years before relocating to Ann Arbor, Michigan.

Commercializing the patented work of Philippe Pradelles and others, Cayman exploited the acetylcholinesterase enzyme of electric eels to develop a range of sensitive enzyme immunoassays for prostaglandins in the late 1980s. The availability of these assays enabled the development of Celebrex by Searle/Monsanto, relying on measurements of prostaglandin E2 and thromboxane B2, and of Singulair by Merck & Co, relying on measurements of unstable leukotrienes.

== Subsidiaries ==
=== Cayman Europe ===
Cayman Europe was established in January, 2005 in Tallinn, Estonia. Their operations focus on the distribution of Cayman Chemical products in Europe.

=== Cayman Pharma ===
Facilities are located in Neratovice, a town 18 miles north of Prague in the Czech Republic. Production is focused on pharmaceutical ingredients for generic drug formulators, specifically bulk prostaglandins.

=== Matreya LLC ===
Matreya, LLC is a lipid biochemical company offering a comprehensive line of sphingolipids, glycosphingolipids, gangliosides, globotriaosylceramides, fatty acids, and sterols.
