= Aleph-4 =

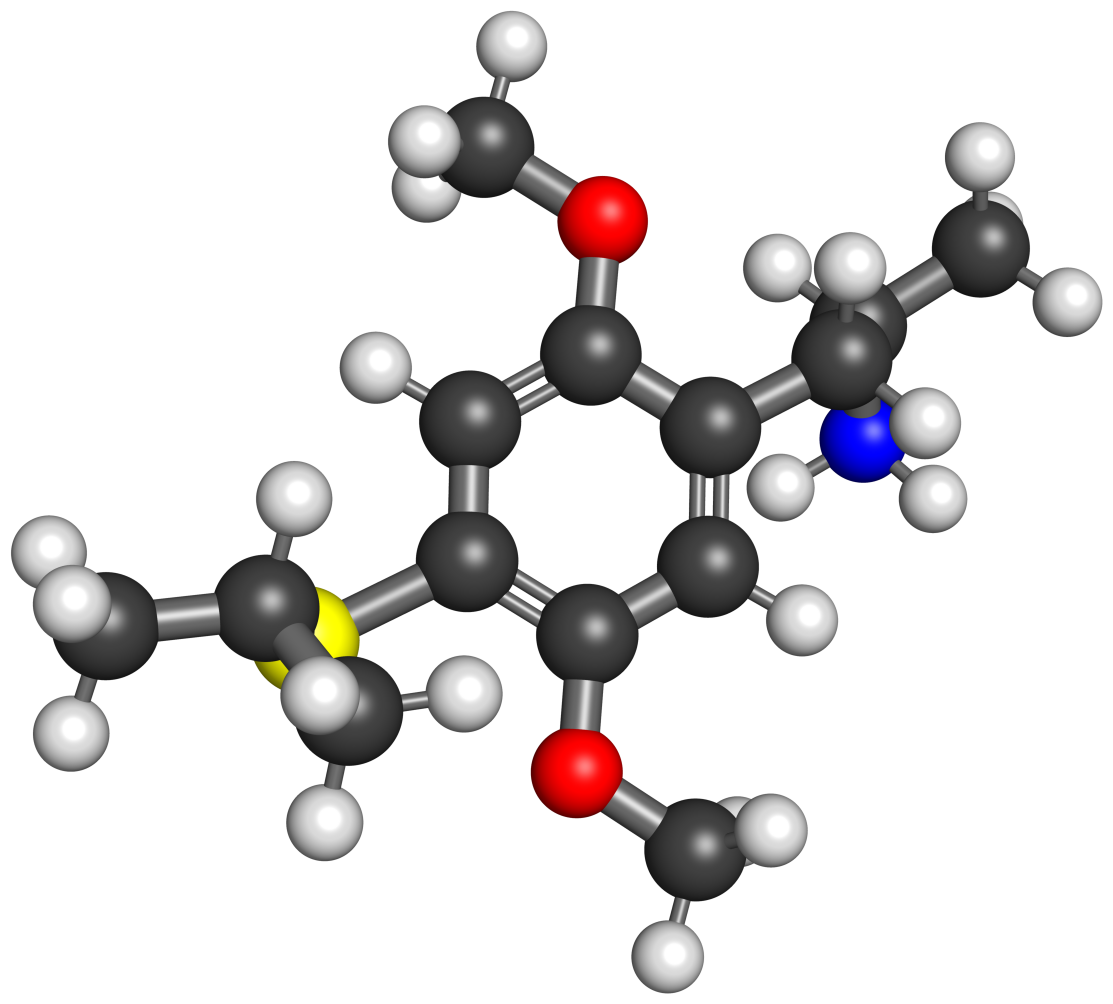

Clinical data
- Other names: ALEPH-4; DOT-4; 4-Isopropylthio-2,5-dimethoxyamphetamine; 2,5-Dimethoxy-4-isopropylthioamphetamine; 4-iPrS-DMA
- Routes of administration: Oral
- Drug class: Serotonergic psychedelic; Hallucinogen
- ATC code: None

Pharmacokinetic data
- Duration of action: 12–20 hours

Identifiers
- IUPAC name: 1-(2,5-dimethoxy-4-propan-2-ylsulfanylphenyl)propan-2-amine
- CAS Number: 123643-26-5
- PubChem CID: 44350301
- ChemSpider: 21500994
- UNII: PJ4M669KSV
- ChEMBL: ChEMBL127653
- CompTox Dashboard (EPA): DTXSID901043040

Chemical and physical data
- Formula: C_{14}H_{23}NO_{2}S
- Molar mass: 269.40 g·mol^{−1}
- 3D model (JSmol): Interactive image
- SMILES: CC(C)SC1=C(C=C(C(=C1)OC)CC(C)N)OC
- InChI: InChI=1S/C14H23NO2S/c1-9(2)18-14-8-12(16-4)11(6-10(3)15)7-13(14)17-5/h7-10H,6,15H2,1-5H3; Key:BCWCXWKCQMBFBQ-UHFFFAOYSA-N

Aleph-4, or ALEPH-4, also known as 4-isopropylthio-2,5-dimethoxyamphetamine, is a psychedelic drug of the phenethylamine, amphetamine, and DOx families. It is one of the Aleph series of compounds.

In his book PiHKAL (Phenethylamines I Have Known and Loved), Alexander Shulgin lists Aleph-4's dose as 7 to 12 mg orally and its duration as 12 to 20 hours. The effects of Aleph-4 have been reported to include closed-eye imagery, enhanced visual appreciation, emotional changes, and physical side effects and toxicity indications, among others. One of the reports remarked that it was "one of the most profound and deep learning experiences" they had had. However, Shulgin was unwilling to push the dose higher than 12 mg due to toxicity concerns.

The chemical synthesis of Aleph-4 has been described.

Aleph-4 was first described in the scientific literature by Shulgin, David E. Nichols, Peyton Jacob III, and other colleagues in 1978. Subsequently, it was described in greater detail by Shulgin in PiHKAL in 1991. The drug was encountered as a novel designer drug in Japan in 2009. It is a Schedule I controlled substance in the United States as an isomer of 2C-T-7. The drug is also a controlled substance in Canada under phenethylamine blanket-ban language.

== See also ==
- DOx (psychedelics)
- Aleph (psychedelics)
- 2C-T-4
