= Biscaline =

Clinical data
- Other names: 4-Phenyl-3,5-dimethoxyphenethylamine; 3,5-Dimethoxy-4-phenylphenethylamine
- Drug class: Monoamine receptor modulator

Identifiers
- IUPAC name: 2-(2,6-dimethoxy[1,1′-biphenyl]-4-yl)ethan-1-amine

Chemical and physical data
- Formula: C_{16}H_{19}NO_{2}
- Molar mass: 257.333 g·mol^{−1}
- 3D model (JSmol): Interactive image
- SMILES: NCCc1cc(OC)c(c(c1)OC)c1ccccc1
- InChI: InChI=1S/C16H19NO2/c1-18-14-10-12(8-9-17)11-15(19-2)16(14)13-6-4-3-5-7-13/h3-7,10-11H,8-9,17H2,1-2H3; Key:ZDAUKFAGIRVDHK-UHFFFAOYSA-N

Biscaline, also known as 3,5-dimethoxy-4-phenylphenethylamine, is a monoamine receptor modulator of the phenethylamine and desoxyscaline families. It is the analogue of mescaline (3,4,5-dimethoxyphenethylamine) in which the methoxy group at the 4 position has been replaced with a phenyl ring.

The drug shows affinity for the serotonin 5-HT_{1A} receptor (K_{i} = 4,021 nM). Conversely, it did not bind to the serotonin 5-HT_{2A}, 5-HT_{2B}, or 5-HT_{2C} receptors at the assessed concentrations (K_{i} = >13,400 nM, >10,000 nM, and >14,590 nM, respectively). It is said to have lacked activational effects on the serotonin 5-HT_{2A} and 5-HT_{2B} receptors at the assessed concentrations. Biscaline also bound to the α_{2A}-adrenergic receptor (K_{i} = 797 nM), but not to the α_{1A}-adrenergic receptor, the dopamine D_{2} receptor, or the monoamine transporters (SERT, NET, or DAT) at the assessed concentrations (K_{i} = >7,510–10,550 nM). It was a very weak monoamine reuptake inhibitor, with IC_{50} values of 457,000 nM for serotonin, 160,000 nM for norepinephrine, and 573,000 nM for dopamine.

Besides the monoamine receptors and transporters, biscaline showed affinity for the rat trace amine-associated receptor 1 (TAAR1) (K_{i} = 586 nM), but not for the mouse TAAR1 (K_{i} = >4,270 nM) and did not activate the human TAAR1 (EC_{50} = >30,000 nM). Biscaline's interaction with the α_{2A}-adrenergic receptor may be the only significant human pharmacological interaction detected with the compound so far. Due to its lack of activation of the serotonin 5-HT_{2A} receptor, biscaline would not be expected to produce psychedelic effects.

A variety of 2C analogues and derivatives of biscaline have been synthesized and studied, such as 2C-Ph (2C-BI-1).

== See also ==
- Desoxyscaline
- 4-PhPr-3,5-DMA
- 3C-BZ
- 4-Desoxymescaline
