= Bis-TOM =

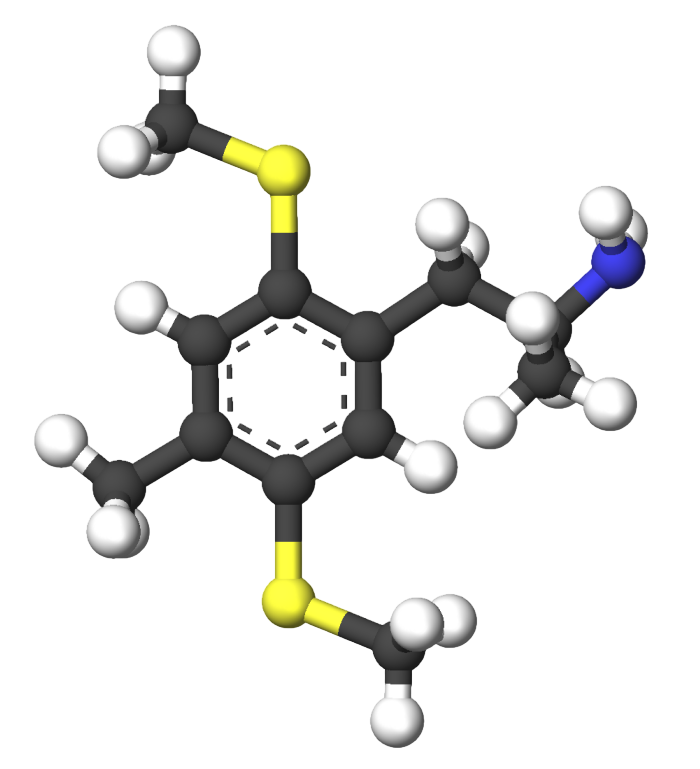

Clinical data
- Other names: BIS-TOM; 2,5-TOM; 4-Methyl-2,5-dimethylthioamphetamine; 2,5-Dimethylthio-4-methylamphetamine; 2,5-Dithio-DOM
- Routes of administration: Oral
- Drug class: Psychoactive drug
- ATC code: None

Pharmacokinetic data
- Duration of action: Unknown

Identifiers
- IUPAC name: 1-[4-methyl-2,5-bis(methylsulfanyl)phenyl]propan-2-amine
- CAS Number: 765225-27-2
- PubChem CID: 15915353
- ChemSpider: 21106269
- UNII: EQ5JDM6DPZ
- ChEMBL: ChEMBL464850
- CompTox Dashboard (EPA): DTXSID40579467

Chemical and physical data
- Formula: C_{12}H_{19}NS_{2}
- Molar mass: 241.41 g·mol^{−1}
- 3D model (JSmol): Interactive image
- SMILES: CSc1cc(C)c(cc1CC(C)N)SC
- InChI: InChI=1S/C12H19NS2/c1-8-5-12(15-4)10(6-9(2)13)7-11(8)14-3/h5,7,9H,6,13H2,1-4H3; Key:XFCQINWERPNOHI-UHFFFAOYSA-N

Bis-TOM, or 2,5-TOM, also known as 4-methyl-2,5-dimethylthioamphetamine or as 2,5-dithio-DOM, is a chemical compound of the phenethylamine and amphetamine families related to DOM. It is the analogue of DOM in which the methoxy groups at the 2 and 5 positions have been replaced with methylthio groups.

In his book PiHKAL (Phenethylamines I Have Known and Loved) and other publications, Alexander Shulgin lists bis-TOM's dose as greater than 160 mg orally and its duration as unknown. The effects of bis-TOM have been reported to include vague awareness of something and "a suggestion of darting, physically (when going to sleep)", but no mental effects. Shulgin concluded that bis-TOM was inactive, at least at tested doses of up to 160 mg orally. Based on the approximate 15-fold loss of potency of 2-TOM compared to DOM and the approximate 10-fold drop in potency of 5-TOM relative to DOM, Shulgin hypothesized that bis-TOM might have a potency reduction of 150-fold and might be active at a dose of around 750 mg orally. However, higher doses were not tested owing in parts to hints of neurological toxicity as the potential rewards were not considered worth the risks.

The chemical synthesis of bis-TOM has been described. The phenethylamine (2C) analogue of bis-TOM is 2C-bis-TOM. This compound was synthesized by Shulgin but was not tested in humans. According to Shulgin, 2C-bis-TOM would probably not be active.

Bis-TOM was first described in the scientific literature by Shulgin and Peyton Jacob III in 1983. Subsequently, it was described in greater detail by Shulgin in his book PiHKAL (Phenethylamines I Have Known and Loved) in 1991.

== See also ==
- DOx (psychedelics)
- 2-TOM, 5-TOM, and TOMSO
