= 5-TOET =

Clinical data
- Other names: 2-Methoxy-4-ethyl-5-methylthioamphetamine; 4-Ethyl-2-methoxy-5-methylthioamphetamine; 5-Thio-DOET; 5T-DOET; 5-Methylthio-DOET
- Routes of administration: Oral
- Drug class: Serotonergic psychedelic; Hallucinogen
- ATC code: None

Pharmacokinetic data
- Onset of action: 30 minutes Peak: 4 hours
- Duration of action: 8–24 hours

Identifiers
- IUPAC name: 1-(4-ethyl-2-methoxy-5-methylsulfanylphenyl)propan-2-amine
- CAS Number: 207740-43-0
- PubChem CID: 15915351
- ChemSpider: 21106386
- UNII: 53KPR8B3A4
- ChEMBL: ChEMBL127095

Chemical and physical data
- Formula: C_{13}H_{21}NOS
- Molar mass: 239.38 g·mol^{−1}
- 3D model (JSmol): Interactive image
- SMILES: CCC1=CC(=C(C=C1SC)CC(C)N)OC
- InChI: InChI=1S/C13H21NOS/c1-5-10-7-12(15-3)11(6-9(2)14)8-13(10)16-4/h7-9H,5-6,14H2,1-4H3; Key:CBSUPAQTEZIWSK-UHFFFAOYSA-N

5-TOET, also known as 2-methoxy-4-ethyl-5-methylthioamphetamine or as 5-thio-DOET, is a psychedelic drug of the phenethylamine and amphetamine families related to the DOx psychedelic DOET. It is the analogue of DOET in which the methoxy group at the 5 position has been replaced with a methylthio group. The drug is one of two possible TOET (thio-DOET) positional isomers, the other being 2-TOET.

In his book PiHKAL (Phenethylamines I Have Known and Loved) and other publications, Alexander Shulgin lists 5-TOET's dose as 12 to 25 mg orally and its duration as 8 to 24 hours. Its onset is about 30 minutes and its time to peak is about 4 hours. The drug is around 5-fold less potent than DOET, which has a listed dose range of 2 to 6 mg orally.

The effects of 5-TOET have been reported to include closed-eye imagery and fantasy, open-eye visuals such as brightness around objects and visual movement, feelings of joy, beauty, love, and serenity, erotic enhancement, restlessness, lightheadedness, pupil dilation, sleep disturbances, and next-day afterglow as well as lethargy. One user described it as "superb", "exquisite", and potentially "extraordinary". It has much less physical discomfort than 5-TOM. There also appears to be significant interindividual variability in intensity of 5-TOET, with two of eight people being roughly twice as sensitive as the others. In addition, an unintentional overdose in one person, despite a similar dose taken as others, was described as intense, exhausting, and too long-lived.

The chemical synthesis of 5-TOET has been described. The phenethylamine analogue, 2C-5-TOET (5-thio-2C-E), has been synthesized, but was not tested and its properties are unknown.

5-TOET was first described in the scientific literature by Alexander Shulgin and Peyton Jacob III in 1983. Subsequently, it was described in greater detail by Shulgin in PiHKAL in 1991.

== See also ==
- Substituted methoxyphenethylamine
- 2-TOET and 5-TOM
- Meta-DOT (5-thio-TMA-2)
