= 5-TOM =

Clinical data
- Other names: 2-Methoxy-4-methyl-5-methylthioamphetamine; 5-Methylthio-4-methyl-2-methoxyamphetamine; 5-Thio-DOM; 5T-DOM; 5-Methylthio-DOM
- Routes of administration: Oral
- Drug class: Serotonergic psychedelic; Hallucinogen
- ATC code: None

Pharmacokinetic data
- Onset of action: 30 minutes Peak: ~3 hours
- Duration of action: 6–10 hours (but up to 12–16 hours)

Identifiers
- IUPAC name: 1-(2-methoxy-4-methyl-5-methylsulfanylphenyl)propan-2-amine
- CAS Number: 207740-45-2
- PubChem CID: 15915349
- ChemSpider: 21106388
- UNII: C4U5T6C5LG
- ChEMBL: ChEMBL338149

Chemical and physical data
- Formula: C_{12}H_{19}NOS
- Molar mass: 225.35 g·mol^{−1}
- 3D model (JSmol): Interactive image
- SMILES: CC1=CC(=C(C=C1SC)CC(C)N)OC
- InChI: InChI=1S/C12H19NOS/c1-8-5-11(14-3)10(6-9(2)13)7-12(8)15-4/h5,7,9H,6,13H2,1-4H3; Key:DPPFTYBYPWHNRM-UHFFFAOYSA-N

5-TOM, also known as 2-methoxy-4-methyl-5-methylthioamphetamine or as 5-thio-DOM, is a psychedelic drug of the phenethylamine and amphetamine families related to the DOx psychedelic DOM. It is the analogue of DOM in which the methoxy group at the 5 position has been replaced with a methylthio group. The drug is one of two possible TOM (thio-DOM) positional isomers, the other being 2-TOM.

In his book PiHKAL (Phenethylamines I Have Known and Loved) and other publications, Alexander Shulgin lists 5-TOM's dose as 30 to 50 mg orally and its duration as 6 to 10 hours (but up to 12–16 hours). Its onset is about 30 minutes and its time to peak is a little over 3 hours. Whereas 5-TOM has an effective dose of around 40 mg, DOM has a fully effective dose of about 5 mg, and so there is around an 8-fold loss of potency with the drug. In addition, it has a shorter duration than DOM, with DOM having a listed duration of 14 to 20 hours.

The effects of 5-TOM have been reported to include sensory enhancement, closed-eye imagery and fantasy, substantial open-eye visuals and some visual distortions, catatonia-like state, "pretty heavy-duty experience", body load, generalized discomfort or malaise, neurological discoordination, gastrointestinal disturbance such as cramping and nausea, irritability, anger, sleep disturbance, and next-day lethargy. According to Shulgin, there were no completely positive experiences, more negative reports than positive ones, not even many neutral reports, and the consensus being that the drug wasn't worth the struggle. There also appears to be significant interindividual variability in intensity of 5-TOM.

The chemical synthesis of 5-TOM has been described. The phenethylamine analogue, 2C-5-TOM (5-thio-2C-D), has been synthesized, but was not tested and its properties are unknown. Bis-TOM, the 2,5-dimethylthio analogue of DOM, was synthesized and tested, but was inactive at doses of up to 160 mg orally or approximately 50 times the minimum effective dose of DOM. TOMSO is the sulfoxide of 5-TOM, and produced few effects on its own at doses of up to 150 mg orally.

5-TOM was first described in the scientific literature by Alexander Shulgin and Peyton Jacob III in 1983. Subsequently, it was described in greater detail by Shulgin in PiHKAL in 1991.

== See also ==
- Substituted methoxyphenethylamine
- 2-TOM and 5-TOET
- Meta-DOT (5-thio-TMA-2)
