= Meta-DOB =

Clinical data
- Other names: 5-Bromo-2,4-dimethoxyamphetamine; 2,4-Dimethoxy-5-bromoamphetamine; 5-Bromo-TMA-2
- Routes of administration: Oral
- Drug class: Psychoactive drug
- ATC code: None

Pharmacokinetic data
- Duration of action: 5–6 hours

Identifiers
- IUPAC name: 1-(5-bromo-2,4-dimethoxyphenyl)propan-2-amine
- CAS Number: 60917-67-1
- PubChem CID: 143750
- ChemSpider: 126826
- UNII: SY5NJH58HC
- ChEMBL: ChEMBL33867
- CompTox Dashboard (EPA): DTXSID30976385

Chemical and physical data
- Formula: C_{11}H_{16}BrNO_{2}
- Molar mass: 274.158 g·mol^{−1}
- 3D model (JSmol): Interactive image
- SMILES: Brc1cc(c(OC)cc1OC)CC(N)C
- InChI: InChI=1S/C11H16BrNO2/c1-7(13)4-8-5-9(12)11(15-3)6-10(8)14-2/h5-7H,4,13H2,1-3H3; Key:YFSLPSITQIUFQK-UHFFFAOYSA-N

Meta-DOB, also known as 5-bromo-2,4-dimethoxyamphetamine, is a psychoactive drug of the phenethylamine and amphetamine families related to the psychedelic drug DOB. It is a positional isomer of DOB in which the bromine atom at the 4 position and the methoxy group at the 5 position have been interchanged.

== Use and effects ==
In his book PiHKAL (Phenethylamines I Have Known and Loved), Alexander Shulgin lists meta-DOB's dose range as 50 to 100 mg orally and its duration as 5 to 6 hours. The effects of meta-DOB have been reported to include MDA-like effects, vague uneasiness, possible threshold psychedelic effects, anxiety, paranoid fantasies, and toxic signs such as flushing, palpitations, and occasional nausea, vomiting, and diarrhea. It has been said that any possible psychedelic effects of meta-DOB seem to have been blurred by its more obvious toxic effects.

== Chemistry ==
=== Synthesis ===
The chemical synthesis of meta-DOB has been described.

=== Analogues ===
meta-DOB is a positional isomer of DOB (para-DOB) and ortho-DOB. Another notable analogue of meta-DOB is meta-DOT.

== History ==
Meta-DOB was first described in the scientific literature by Silvia Sepúlveda and colleagues by 1972. Subsequently, it was described in greater detail by Alexander Shulgin in his book PiHKAL (Phenethylamines I Have Known and Loved) in 1991.

== See also ==
- Substituted methoxyphenethylamine
- DOx § Related compounds
