= 2C-T-27 =

Clinical data
- Other names: 4-Benzylthio-2,5-dimethoxyphenethylamine
- Routes of administration: Oral
- Drug class: Serotonin receptor agonist; Serotonin 5-HT_{2A} receptor agonist; Serotonergic psychedelic; Hallucinogen
- ATC code: None

Pharmacokinetic data
- Duration of action: Unknown

Identifiers
- IUPAC name: 2-(4-benzylsulfanyl-2,5-dimethoxyphenyl)ethanamine
- PubChem CID: 12063261

Chemical and physical data
- Formula: C_{17}H_{21}NO_{2}S
- Molar mass: 303.42 g·mol^{−1}
- 3D model (JSmol): Interactive image
- SMILES: COC1=CC(=C(C=C1CCN)OC)SCC2=CC=CC=C2
- InChI: InChI=1S/C17H21NO2S/c1-19-15-11-17(16(20-2)10-14(15)8-9-18)21-12-13-6-4-3-5-7-13/h3-7,10-11H,8-9,12,18H2,1-2H3; Key:GRZVJRPTNCONNT-UHFFFAOYSA-N

2C-T-27, also known as 4-benzylthio-2,5-dimethoxyphenethylamine, is a psychedelic drug of the phenethylamine and 2C families.

== Use and effects ==
2C-T-27 has been reported to produce hallucinogenic effects in humans. Its dose was reported by Daniel Trachsel to be 80 mg or more orally and no duration was listed.

== Pharmacology ==
=== Pharmacodynamics ===
In addition to the serotonin 5-HT_{2A} receptor, 2C-T-27 interacts with the serotonin 5-HT_{2C} receptor. It showed higher affinity for the serotonin 5-HT_{2A} receptor than any other 2C drug (K_{i} = 1.6 nM), but its activational potency and efficacy were among the lowest (EC_{50} = 26 nM; E_{max} = 27%).

The drug produces the head-twitch response (HTR), a behavioral proxy of psychedelic effects, in rodents. However, the HTR induced by 2C-T-27 is relatively weak.

== Chemistry ==
=== Analogues ===
Analogues of 2C-T-27 include 2C-T-6, 2C-T-31, and 2C-T-33, among others.

== History ==
2C-T-27 was first synthesized and described by Daniel Trachsel in 2003.

== Society and culture ==
=== Legal status ===
==== Canada ====
2C-T-27 is a controlled substance in Canada under phenethylamine blanket-ban language.

== See also ==
- 2C (psychedelics)
- 2C-T-8
- 3C-BZ
- Benzscaline (BZ)
- 2C-Ph
