= Aleph-6 =

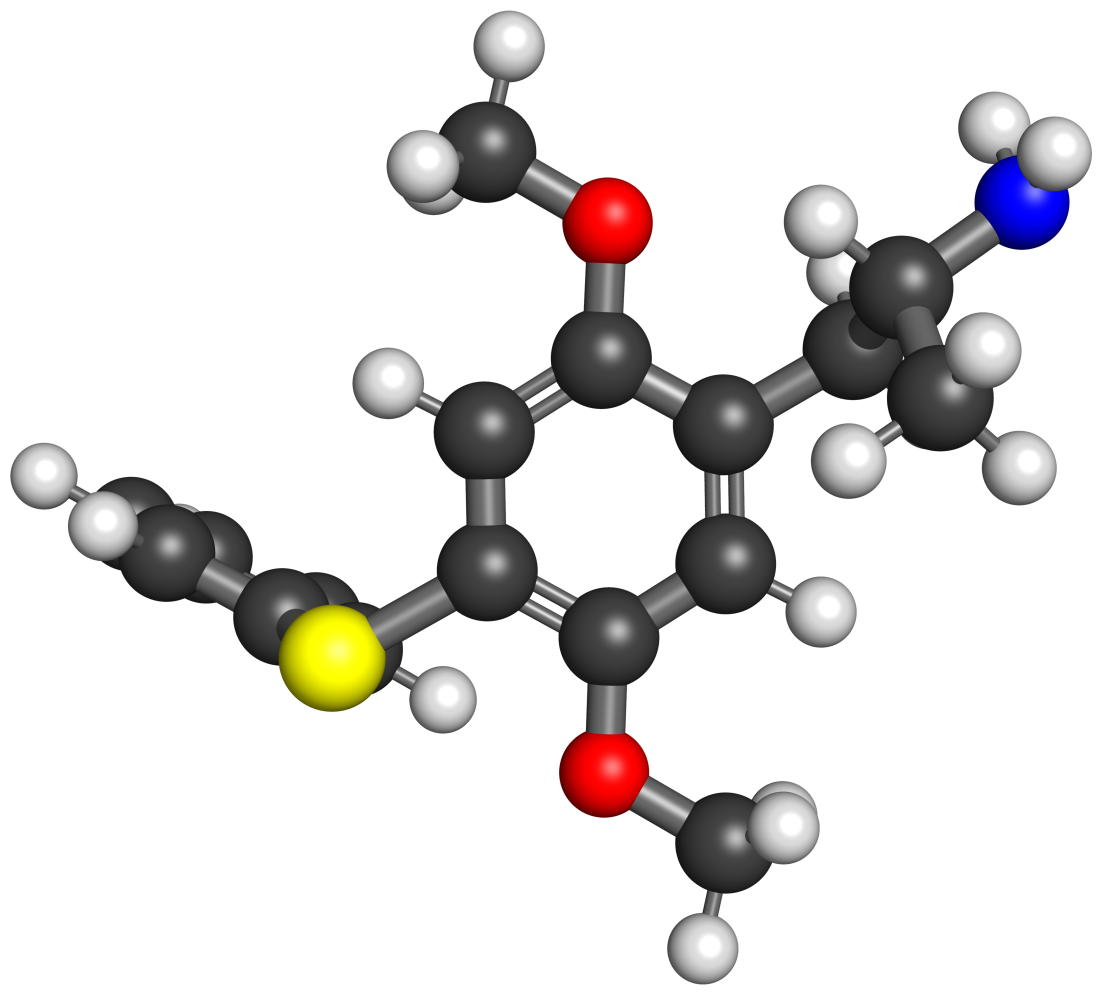

Clinical data
- Other names: ALEPH-6; DOT-6; 4-Phenylthio-2,5-dimethoxyamphetamine; 2,5-Dimethoxy-4-phenylthioamphetamine; 4-PhS-DMA
- Routes of administration: Oral
- Drug class: Serotonergic psychedelic; Hallucinogen
- ATC code: None

Pharmacokinetic data
- Duration of action: "Probably long" (at least 12 hours)

Identifiers
- IUPAC name: 1-(2,5-dimethoxy-4-phenylsulfanylphenyl)propan-2-amine
- CAS Number: 952006-44-9
- PubChem CID: 44719475
- ChemSpider: 23552980
- UNII: 3961V7J60A
- CompTox Dashboard (EPA): DTXSID501024775

Chemical and physical data
- Formula: C_{17}H_{21}NO_{2}S
- Molar mass: 303.42 g·mol^{−1}
- 3D model (JSmol): Interactive image
- SMILES: CC(CC1=CC(=C(C=C1OC)SC2=CC=CC=C2)OC)N
- InChI: InChI=1S/C17H21NO2S/c1-12(18)9-13-10-16(20-3)17(11-15(13)19-2)21-14-7-5-4-6-8-14/h4-8,10-12H,9,18H2,1-3H3; Key:CSOTVYXYZSJOFL-UHFFFAOYSA-N

Aleph-6, or ALEPH-6, also known as 4-phenylthio-2,5-dimethoxyamphetamine, is a psychedelic drug of the phenethylamine, amphetamine, and DOx families. It is one of the Aleph series of compounds.

In his book PiHKAL (Phenethylamines I Have Known and Loved), Alexander Shulgin lists Aleph-6's dose as greater than 40 mg orally and its duration as "probably long". The effects of Aleph-6 have been reported to include "un-worldliness", among others. It was reported to have synergized with LSD when taken in combination with it. Overall however, Shulgin regarded Aleph-6 as a "disappointment" and that it may be a "forever threshold thing".

The chemical synthesis of Aleph-6 has been described. The 2C analogue, 2C-T-6, has never been synthesized.

Aleph-6 was first described in the literature by Shulgin in PiHKAL in 1991. It is a controlled substance in Canada under phenethylamine blanket-ban language.

== See also ==
- DOx (psychedelics)
- Aleph (psychedelics)
