= 4-PhPr-3,5-DMA =

Clinical data
- Other names: 4-(3-Phenylpropyl)-3,5-dimethoxyamphetamine; 1-[3,5-Dimethoxy-4-(3-phenylpropyl)phenyl]-2-aminopropane; 4-PP-3,5-DMA
- Drug class: Serotonin 5-HT_{2} receptor modulator; Serotonin 5-HT_{2A} receptor partial agonist

Identifiers
- IUPAC name: 1-[3,5-dimethoxy-4-(3-phenylpropyl)phenyl]propan-2-amine
- CAS Number: 785765-10-8
- PubChem CID: 10064187
- ChemSpider: 8239727
- ChEMBL: ChEMBL102268

Chemical and physical data
- Formula: C_{20}H_{27}NO_{2}
- Molar mass: 313.441 g·mol^{−1}
- 3D model (JSmol): Interactive image
- SMILES: CC(CC1=CC(=C(C(=C1)OC)CCCC2=CC=CC=C2)OC)N
- InChI: InChI=1S/C20H27NO2/c1-15(21)12-17-13-19(22-2)18(20(14-17)23-3)11-7-10-16-8-5-4-6-9-16/h4-6,8-9,13-15H,7,10-12,21H2,1-3H3; Key:ATJLAXPLVFCXTQ-UHFFFAOYSA-N

4-PhPr-3,5-DMA, also known as 4-(3-phenylpropyl)-3,5-dimethoxyamphetamine, is a serotonin receptor modulator of the phenethylamine, amphetamine, and 3C-desoxyscaline families. It is structurally related to the DOx drugs but has one of its methoxy groups in the 3 position instead of 2 position on the phenyl ring and has a bulky substitution at the 4 position of the phenyl ring.

The affinities (K_{i}) of 4-PhPr-3,5-DMA for the serotonin 5-HT_{2} receptors have been reported to be 4 nM for the serotonin 5-HT_{2A} receptor and 40 nM for the serotonin 5-HT_{2C} receptor, with approximately 10-fold selectivity for the serotonin 5-HT_{2A} receptor over the serotonin 5-HT_{2C} receptor. Its affinities for the serotonin 5-HT_{2A} and 5-HT_{2C} receptors in the study were approximately 8-fold and 1.6-fold higher than those of DOB, respectively. The drug was a full agonist of the serotonin 5-HT_{2A} receptor in terms of phosphatidylinositol (PI) hydrolysis (E_{max} = 109% relative to serotonin). However, in the presence of the serotonin 5-HT_{2A} receptor silent antagonist ketanserin, which should have abolished stimulation, 4-PhPr-3,5-DMA still produced 43% activation of PI hydrolysis. These findings suggest that 4-PhPr-3,5-DMA may be acting in the assay via a combination of both serotonin 5-HT_{2A} receptor partial agonism and another unknown ketanserin-insensitive mechanism.

The observed serotonin 5-HT_{2A} receptor agonist activity of 4-PhPr-3,5-DMA was surprising, as previously studied DOx derivatives with bulky 4-position substituents such as DOHx had consistently acted as antagonists of the serotonin 5-HT_{2A} receptor. In addition, the 3,5-dimethoxy substitution pattern being optimal in the study was unexpected, as the 2,5-dimethoxy pattern has been found to be optimal in the DOx drugs. The study's findings suggest that bulky substitutions at the 4 position of DOx-like amphetamines can provide enhanced serotonin 5-HT_{2A} receptor affinity but will not inevitably result in antagonism. Instead, agonism, and possible psychedelic effects, may be retainable with specific substitution patterns.

An analogue is 4-PhPr-2,5-DMA (DOPP or DOPhPr), which is also a weak partial agonist of the serotonin 5-HT_{2A} receptor.

== See also ==
- Desoxyscaline
- 3C (psychedelics)
- Phenescaline
- 3C-BZ
- Benzscaline (BZ)
- SCHEMBL5334361
- 4-PhPr-PEA
