= Aleph (psychedelic) =

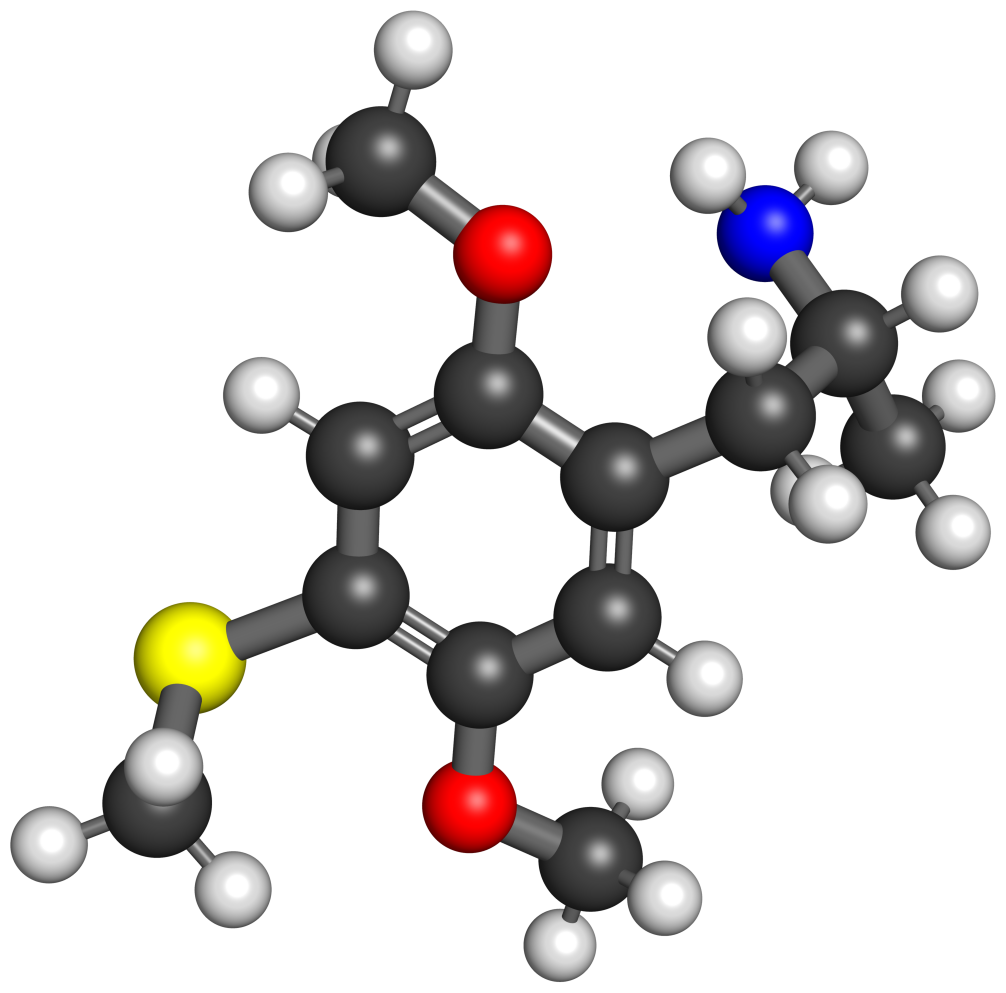

Clinical data
- Other names: Aleph; Aleph-1; ALEPH; ALEPH-1; DOT; DOT-1; Para-DOT; 4-Methylthio-2,5-dimethoxyamphetamine; 2,5-Dimethoxy-4-methylthioamphetamine; 4-MeS-DMA; 4-Thio-TMA-2
- Routes of administration: Oral
- Drug class: Serotonin receptor modulator; Serotonin 5-HT_{2A} receptor agonist; Serotonergic psychedelic; Hallucinogen
- ATC code: None

Pharmacokinetic data
- Duration of action: 6–8 hours

Identifiers
- IUPAC name: 1-[2,5-dimethoxy-4-(methylsulfanyl)phenyl]propan-2-amine
- CAS Number: 61638-07-1
- PubChem CID: 143828
- ChemSpider: 126887
- UNII: C9ZVF4O01N
- ChEMBL: ChEMBL447830
- CompTox Dashboard (EPA): DTXSID80874362

Chemical and physical data
- Formula: C_{12}H_{19}NO_{2}S
- Molar mass: 241.35 g·mol^{−1}
- 3D model (JSmol): Interactive image
- SMILES: C1(=C(C=C(C(=C1)SC)OC)CC(C)N)OC
- InChI: InChI=1S/C12H19NO2S/c1-8(13)5-9-6-11(15-3)12(16-4)7-10(9)14-2/h6-8H,5,13H2,1-4H3; Key:COBYBOVXXDQRAU-UHFFFAOYSA-N

Aleph, or ALEPH-1, also known as DOT or para-DOT or as 4-methylthio-2,5-dimethoxyamphetamine, is a psychedelic drug of the phenethylamine, amphetamine, and DOx families. It is one of the Aleph series of compounds.

== Use and effects ==
In his book PiHKAL (Phenethylamines I Have Known and Loved), Alexander Shulgin lists Aleph's dose range as 5 to 10 mg orally and its duration as 6 to 8 hours. The effects of Aleph have been reported to include simple tasks feeling "alien", intense intellectual stimulation, impairment, a sensation of pleasant physical warmth, and an afterglow including feelings of empathy for everything.

== Pharmacology ==
=== Pharmacodynamics ===
Aleph is known to be a superagonist of the serotonin 5-HT_{2A} receptor (EC_{50} = 10–66 nM; E_{max} = 114–191%).

It has weak MAO-A inhibitory activity with an IC_{50} of 5.2 μM. For comparison, amphetamine has an IC_{50} of 11 μM and 4-methylthioamphetamine (4-MTA) has a value of 0.2 μM.

== Chemistry ==
=== Synthesis ===
The chemical synthesis of Aleph has been described.

=== Derivatives ===
Derivatives of Aleph include Aleph-2, Aleph-4, Aleph-6, and Aleph-7. The Aleph series of compounds are the DOx or amphetamine analogues of 2C-T, 2C-T-2, 2C-T-4, 2C-T-6, and 2C-T-7, respectively.

== History ==
Aleph was first tested by Alexander Shulgin in 1975. It was first described in the scientific literature by Shulgin and David E. Nichols in 1976. Its properties and effects in humans were described by them in 1978. Subsequently, the drug was described in greater detail by Shulgin in his 1991 book PiHKAL (Phenethylamines I Have Known and Loved).

== Society and culture ==
=== Names ===
Aleph was named by Alexander Shulgin, who named it after the first letter of the Hebrew alphabet. Another earlier name of the drug is para-DOT.

=== Legal status ===
==== Canada ====
Aleph is a controlled substance in Canada under phenethylamine blanket-ban language.

==== United States ====
In the United States, Aleph is a Schedule 1 controlled substance as a positional isomer of 2C-T-4 and 2C-T-7.

== See also ==
- DOx (psychedelics)
- 2C-T
