= 2-TOET =

Clinical data
- Other names: 2-Methylthio-4-ethyl-5-methoxyamphetamine; 4-Ethyl-2-methylthio-5-methoxyamphetamine; 2-Thio-DOET; 2T-DOET; 2-Methylthio-DOET
- Routes of administration: Oral
- Drug class: Psychoactive drug
- ATC code: None

Pharmacokinetic data
- Duration of action: Unknown (but long-lasting)

Identifiers
- IUPAC name: 1-(4-ethyl-5-methoxy-2-methylsulfanylphenyl)propan-2-amine
- CAS Number: 779279-63-9
- PubChem CID: 15915347
- ChemSpider: 21106408
- UNII: 28GRS3DSL2

Chemical and physical data
- Formula: C_{13}H_{21}NOS
- Molar mass: 239.38 g·mol^{−1}
- 3D model (JSmol): Interactive image
- SMILES: CCC1=CC(=C(C=C1OC)CC(C)N)SC
- InChI: InChI=1S/C13H21NOS/c1-5-10-8-13(16-4)11(6-9(2)14)7-12(10)15-3/h7-9H,5-6,14H2,1-4H3; Key:TZIBUOSWJBKVTA-UHFFFAOYSA-N

2-TOET, also known as 2-methylthio-4-ethyl-5-methoxyamphetamine or as 2-thio-DOET, is a psychoactive drug of the phenethylamine and amphetamine families related to the DOx psychedelic DOET. It is the analogue of DOET in which the methoxy group at the 2 position has been replaced with a methylthio group. The drug is one of two possible TOET (thio-DOET) positional isomers, the other being 5-TOET.

In his book PiHKAL (Phenethylamines I Have Known and Loved) and other publications, Alexander Shulgin lists 2-TOET's dose as greater than 65 mg orally and its duration as unknown (but long-lasting). The drug is more than 10-fold less potent than DOET, which has a listed dose range of 2 to 6 mg orally.

The effects of 2-TOET have been reported to include slight lightheadedness, feeling physically a bit fragile, possible appetite loss, possible erectile dysfunction, and next-day residual fragility. It was described as inactive as a hallucinogen at assessed doses, and higher doses were not tested.

The chemical synthesis of 2-TOET has been described. The phenethylamine analogue, 2C-2-TOET (2-thio-2C-E), has been synthesized, but was not tested and its properties are unknown.

2-TOET was first described in the scientific literature by Alexander Shulgin and Peyton Jacob III in 1983. Subsequently, it was described in greater detail by Shulgin in PiHKAL in 1991.

== See also ==
- Substituted methoxyphenethylamine
- 5-TOET and 2-TOM
- Ortho-DOT (2-thio-TMA-2)
