= 2-TOM =

Clinical data
- Other names: 2-Methylthio-4-methyl-5-methoxyamphetamine; 5-Methoxy-4-methyl-2-methylthioamphetamine; 2-Thio-DOM; 2T-DOM; 2-Methylthio-DOM
- Routes of administration: Oral
- Drug class: Serotonergic psychedelic; Hallucinogen
- ATC code: None

Pharmacokinetic data
- Duration of action: 8–10 hours

Identifiers
- IUPAC name: 1-(5-methoxy-4-methyl-2-methylsulfanylphenyl)propan-2-amine
- CAS Number: 207740-44-1
- PubChem CID: 15915345
- ChemSpider: 21106409
- UNII: PWF2TYB2Z5
- ChEMBL: ChEMBL123914

Chemical and physical data
- Formula: C_{12}H_{19}NOS
- Molar mass: 225.35 g·mol^{−1}
- 3D model (JSmol): Interactive image
- SMILES: CC1=CC(=C(C=C1OC)CC(C)N)SC
- InChI: InChI=1S/C12H19NOS/c1-8-5-12(15-4)10(6-9(2)13)7-11(8)14-3/h5,7,9H,6,13H2,1-4H3; Key:CROYZNIEESCKGY-UHFFFAOYSA-N

2-TOM, also known as 2-methylthio-4-methyl-5-methoxyamphetamine or as 2-thio-DOM, is a psychedelic drug of the phenethylamine and amphetamine families related to the DOx psychedelic DOM. It is the analogue of DOM in which the methoxy group at the 2 position has been replaced with a methylthio group. The drug is one of two possible TOM (thio-DOM) positional isomers, the other being 5-TOM.

In his book PiHKAL (Phenethylamines I Have Known and Loved) and other publications, Alexander Shulgin lists 2-TOM's dose as 60 to 100 mg orally and its duration as 8 to 10 hours. Whereas 2-TOM has a fully effective dose of around 80 mg, DOM has a fully effective dose of about 5 mg, and so there is around a 15-fold loss of potency with the drug. In addition, it has a shorter duration than DOM, with DOM having a listed duration of 14 to 20 hours.

The effects of 2-TOM have been reported to include closed-eye visuals, feeling strange, "superb body feeling", pleasantness, bodily awareness, and feeling heavy. It has none of the neurological or physical "roughness" that was observed with 5-TOM.

The chemical synthesis of 2-TOM has been described. The phenethylamine analogue, 2C-2-TOM (2-thio-2C-D), has been synthesized, but was not tested and its properties are unknown. Bis-TOM, the 2,5-dimethylthio analogue of DOM, was synthesized and tested, but was inactive at doses of up to 160 mg orally or approximately 50 times the minimum effective dose of DOM.

2-TOM was first described in the scientific literature by Alexander Shulgin and Peyton Jacob III in 1983. Subsequently, it was described in greater detail by Shulgin in PiHKAL in 1991.

== See also ==
- Substituted methoxyphenethylamine
- 5-TOM and 2-TOET
- Ortho-DOT (2-thio-TMA-2)
