= 3C-BZ =

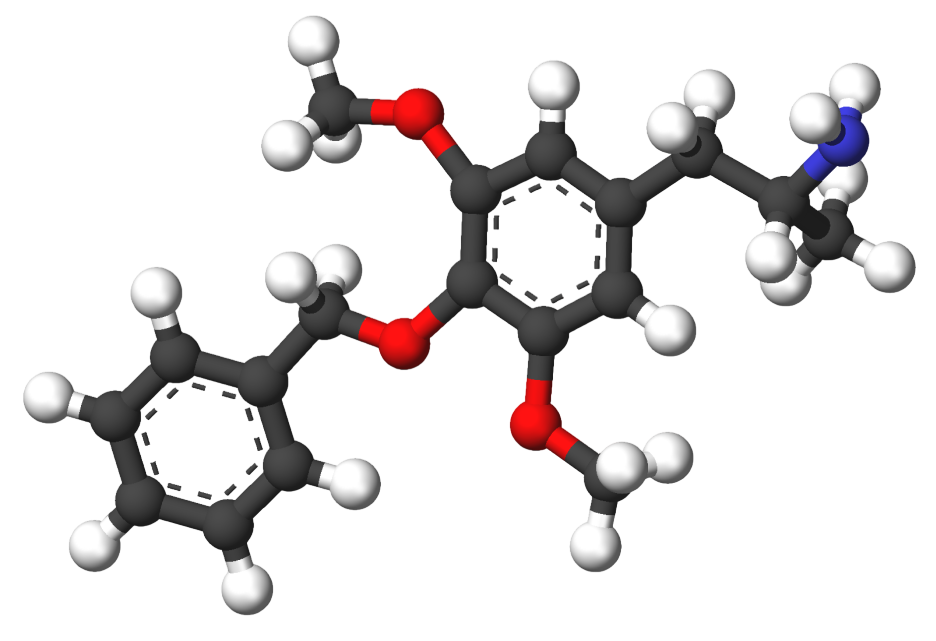

Clinical data
- Other names: 4-Benzyloxy-3,5-methoxyamphetamine; 3,5-Methoxy-4-benzyloxyamphetamine; α-Methylbenzscaline; 3C-Benzscaline
- Routes of administration: Oral
- Drug class: Serotonergic psychedelic; Hallucinogen
- ATC code: None

Pharmacokinetic data
- Onset of action: 30 minutes
- Duration of action: 18–24 hours

Identifiers
- IUPAC name: 1-[4-(benzyloxy)-3,5-dimethoxyphenyl]propan-2-amine
- CAS Number: 147947-26-0
- PubChem CID: 44350160
- ChemSpider: 21106236
- UNII: FH79WY8EA2
- ChEMBL: ChEMBL127871
- CompTox Dashboard (EPA): DTXSID20658385

Chemical and physical data
- Formula: C_{18}H_{23}NO_{3}
- Molar mass: 301.386 g·mol^{−1}
- 3D model (JSmol): Interactive image
- SMILES: CC(N)Cc2cc(OC)c(OCc1ccccc1)c(c2)OC
- InChI: InChI=1S/C18H23NO3/c1-13(19)9-15-10-16(20-2)18(17(11-15)21-3)22-12-14-7-5-4-6-8-14/h4-8,10-11,13H,9,12,19H2,1-3H3; Key:IQKPLBJGFPDASR-UHFFFAOYSA-N

3C-BZ, also known as 4-benzyloxy-3,5-dimethoxyamphetamine or as α-methylbenzscaline (3C-benzscaline), is a psychedelic drug of the phenethylamine, amphetamine, and 3C families related to 3,4,5-trimethoxyamphetamine (TMA). It is the amphetamine (3C) analogue of benzscaline. The drug was first synthesized by Alexander Shulgin and described in his 1991 book PiHKAL (Phenethylamines I Have Known and Loved).

== Use and effects ==
In his book PiHKAL (Phenethylamines I Have Known and Loved), Alexander Shulgin lists 3C-BZ's dose as 25 to 200 mg and its duration as 18 to 24 hours. Its onset is 30 minutes.

The effects of 3C-BZ have been reported to include suggestions of changes in the visual field, hypnagogic imagery, wakefulness, alertness, feeling wound up, amphetamine-like component, erotic fantasy, emotionality, uncomfortableness and brittleness, childhood reminiscences, and wild but not-too-friendly dreams. Other effects included slight lightheadedness, fleeting nausea, no body threat, tiredness, and insomnia. Multiple individuals reported that it lasted too long. One person had no effects at 100 mg despite others having effects at 25 to 100 mg and above. Another claimed that 150 mg was in every way identical to 100 μg LSD. A final person found that it had many similarities to TMA that they had recently tried, but was more intense at the taken dose of 180 mg.

== Chemistry ==
=== Synthesis ===
3C-BZ was originally synthesized by Alexander Shulgin starting from 5-methoxyeugenol (4-allyl-2,6-dimethoxyphenol) through a reaction with benzyl chloride to form the benzyloxy derivative of 5-methoxyeugenol. The obtained benzyl derivative was reacted with tetranitromethane to form 1-[4-(benzyloxy)-3,5-dimethoxyphenyl]-2-nitro-1-propene, from which 3C-BZ is obtained by reduction of the nitropropene with lithium aluminium hydride.

Another possible synthetic route would be the reaction of benzyl chloride with syringaldehyde to form 3,5-dimethoxy-4-benzyloxybenzaldehyde followed by condensation with nitroethane to form 1-[4-(benzyloxy)-3,5-dimethoxyphenyl]-2-nitro-1-propene. The obtained nitropropene can be reduced using lithium aluminium hydride, Red-Al, or an aluminium-mercury amalgam.

== History ==
3C-BZ was first described in the scientific literature by Alexander Shulgin and colleagues by 1978. Subsequently, it was described in greater detail by Shulgin in his book PiHKAL (Phenethylamines I Have Known and Loved) in 1991.

== Society and culture ==
=== Legal status ===
==== Canada ====
3C-BZ is a controlled substance in Canada under phenethylamine blanket-ban language.

==== United States ====
3C-BZ is not an explicitly controlled substance in the United States. However, it could be considered a controlled substance under the Federal Analogue Act if intended for human consumption.

== See also ==
- 3C (psychedelics)
- Benzscaline (BZ)
- Biscaline
- 4-PhPr-3,5-DMA
- 2C-T-33
