= DMMDA =

Psychedelic drug

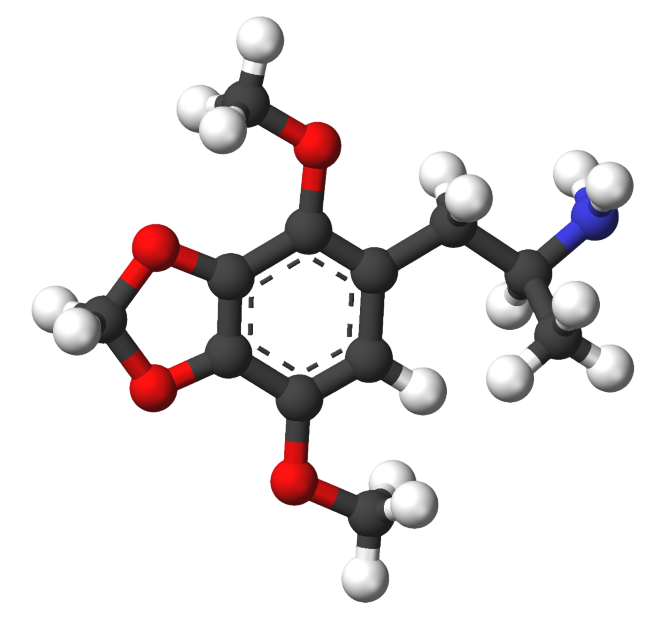

Clinical data
- Other names: 2,5-Dimethoxy-3,4-methylenedioxyamphetamine; DMMDA; DMMDA-1
- Routes of administration: Oral
- Drug class: Serotonergic psychedelic; Hallucinogen
- ATC code: None

Legal status
- Legal status: CA: Schedule I; UK: Class A

Pharmacokinetic data
- Duration of action: 6–8 hours

Identifiers
- IUPAC name: 1-(4,7-Dimethoxy-1,3-benzodioxol-5-yl)propan-2-amine
- CAS Number: 15183-13-8
- PubChem CID: 44349928
- ChemSpider: 21106291
- UNII: Y6T4R5Z3VU
- ChEMBL: ChEMBL126311
- CompTox Dashboard (EPA): DTXSID40658367

Chemical and physical data
- Formula: C_{12}H_{17}NO_{4}
- Molar mass: 239.271 g·mol^{−1}
- 3D model (JSmol): Interactive image
- SMILES: CC(N)Cc1cc(OC)c2OCOc2c1OC
- InChI: InChI=1S/C12H17NO4/c1-7(13)4-8-5-9(14-2)11-12(10(8)15-3)17-6-16-11/h5,7H,4,6,13H2,1-3H3; Key:GRGRGLVMGTVCNZ-UHFFFAOYSA-N

2,5-Dimethoxy-3,4-methylenedioxyamphetamine (DMMDA or DMMDA-1) is a lesser-known psychedelic drug of the amphetamine and MDxx families related to MMDA. It was first synthesized by Alexander Shulgin in the 1960s and was described in his 1991 book PiHKAL (Phenethylamines I Have Known and Loved).

== Use and effects ==
Alexander Shulgin listed the dose of DMMDA in his book PiHKAL (Phenethylamines I Have Known and Loved) as 30 to 75 mg orally and the duration as 6 to 8 hours. He reported DMMDA as producing LSD-like subjective effects: images, mydriasis, ataxia, and time dilation. DMMDA is not mentioned much in literature outside PiHKAL.

== Pharmacology ==
=== Pharmacodynamics ===
The mechanism behind the subjective effects of DMMDA has not been specifically established. In PiHKAL, Shulgin asserts that the subjective effects of 75 mg of DMMDA are equivalent to those of 75 to 100 μg of LSD. LSD is a well-known partial agonist of the serotonin 5-HT_{2A} receptor. This may suggest that DMMDA is also an agonist or partial agonist of the 5-HT_{2A} receptor.

DMMDA is equivalent to 12 "mescaline units" in terms of potency. DMMDA's isomer DMMDA-2 is equivalent to 5 "mescaline units" in terms of potency.

Repeated administration of mescaline (3,4,5-trimethoxyphenethylamine), a somewhat similar compound to DMMDA, has shown to slowly create tolerance. This may suggest that the same applies to DMMDA.

== Chemistry ==
=== Isomers and enantiomers ===
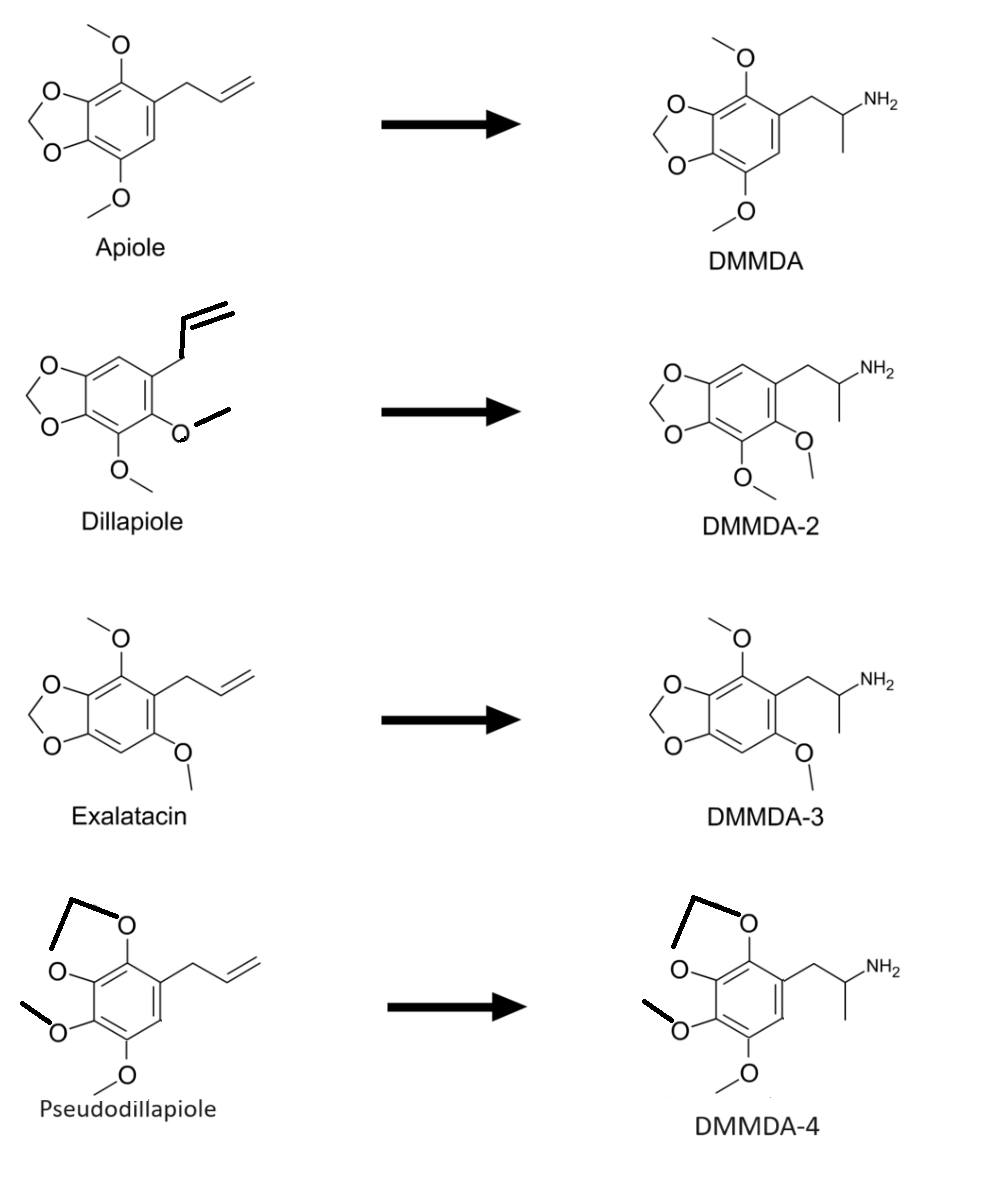
Precursors in the synthesis of DMMDA and its regioisomers.

Shulgin explains in his book that DMMDA has 6 isomers similar to TMA. DMMDA-2 is the only other isomer that has been synthesized as of yet. DMMDA-3 could be made from exalatacin (1-allyl-2,6-dimethoxy-3,4-methylenedioxybenzene). Exalatacin can be found in the essential oil of both Crowea exalata and Crowea angustifolia var. angustifolia. In other words, exalatacin is an isomer of both apiole and dillapiole, which can be used to make DMMDA and DMMDA-2 respectively. Additionally, yet another isomer of DMMDA could be made from pseudodillapiole or 4,5-dimethoxy-2,3-methylenedioxyallylbenzene. The last two isomers of DMMDA are 5,6-dimethoxy-2,3-methylenedioxy-1-α-methylphenylethylamine and 4,6-dimethoxy-2,3-methylenedioxy-1-α-methylphenylethylamine.

Like all other α-methylphenylethylamine derivative compounds, DMMDA and its regioisomer have two enantiomers due to the methyl group being in the alpha position of the ethyl group in position number 1 on the benzene ring. There is no information regarding the differences in the pharmacological effects of (S)-DMMDA and (R)-DMMDA.

=== Synthesis ===
==== Shulgin's synthesis ====
Shulgin describes the synthesis of DMMDA from apiole in his PiHKAL. Apiole is subjected to an isomerization reaction to yield isoapiole by adding to solution of ethanolic potassium hydroxide and holding the solution at a steam bath. Isoapiole is then nitrated to 2-nitro-isoapiole or 1-(2,3-dimethoxy-3,4-methylenedioxyphenyl)-2-nitropropene by adding it to a stirred solution of acetone and pyridine at ice-bath temperatures and treating the solution with tetranitromethane. The pyridine acts as a catalyst in this reaction. 2,5-dimethoxy-3,4-methylenedioxybenzaldehyde can also be used as precursors in this step of the synthesis. The 2-nitro-isoapiole is finally reduced to freebase DMMDA by adding it to a well-stirred and refluxing suspension of diethylether and lithium aluminium hydride under an inert atmosphere. The reduction can also be achieved with pressurized hydrogen. Finally, the freebase DMMDA converted into its hydrochloride salt.

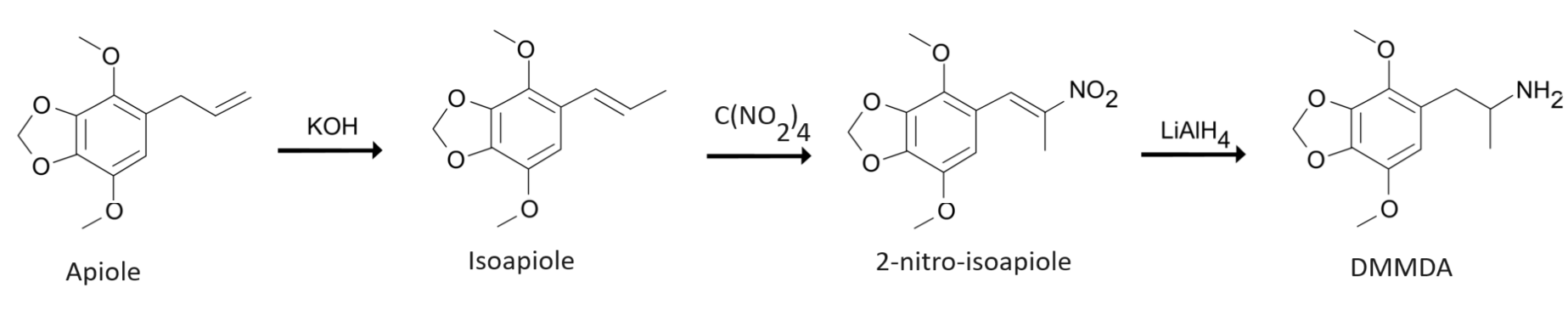
Alexander Shulgin's synthesis of DMMDA.

==== Other synthetic methods ====
Shulgin's synthesis of DMMDA can reasonably be considered unsafe, at least by modern standards, since it uses tetranitromethane for its nitration reaction, which is toxic, carcinogenic and prone to detonating. DMMDA can be made from apiole via other safer methods. Among other methods, DMMDA can be synthesized from apiole via the intermediate chemical 2,5-dimethoxy-3,4-methylenedioxyphenylpropan-2-one or DMMDP2P in the same manner as MDA is made from safrole.

DMMDP2P can be made from apiole via a Wacker oxidation with benzoquinone. DMMDP2P can be alternatively made by subjecting apiole to an isomerisation reaction to yield the thermodynamically stabler internal alkene, isoapiole, followed by a peroxyacid oxidation, with for example peracetic acid, and finally a hydrolytic dehydration. Peroxyacids can be made by combining hydrogen peroxide with an acid like formic acid or acetic acid to create performic acid or peracetic acid. It has been suggested that peroxynitric acid could also be used in this synthesis. The oxidation first creates an epoxide in the alkene of isoapiole and then isopaiole glycol's monoformate ester if peracetic acid is used. The hydrolysis is usually acid-catalyzed with a strong acid, such as sulphuric acid or hydrochloric acid, because the strong acid will also result in the intermediary isoapiole monoformyl glycol being dehydrated to DMMDP2P via a pinacol rearrangement. A small amount of the epoxide can form a carboxycation, which can rearrange itself to DMMDP2P, or react with water to form isoapiole glycol. Thus only one reagent, sulphuric acid, is needed for both the hydrolysis and dehydration and both reactions can be done in the same reaction vessel. Then the DMMDP2P can then be subjected to a reductive amination with a source of nitrogen, such as ammonium chloride or ammonium nitrate, and a reducing agent, such as sodium cyanoborohydride, an amalgam of mercury and aluminium or pressurized hydrogen, to yield freebase DMMDA.

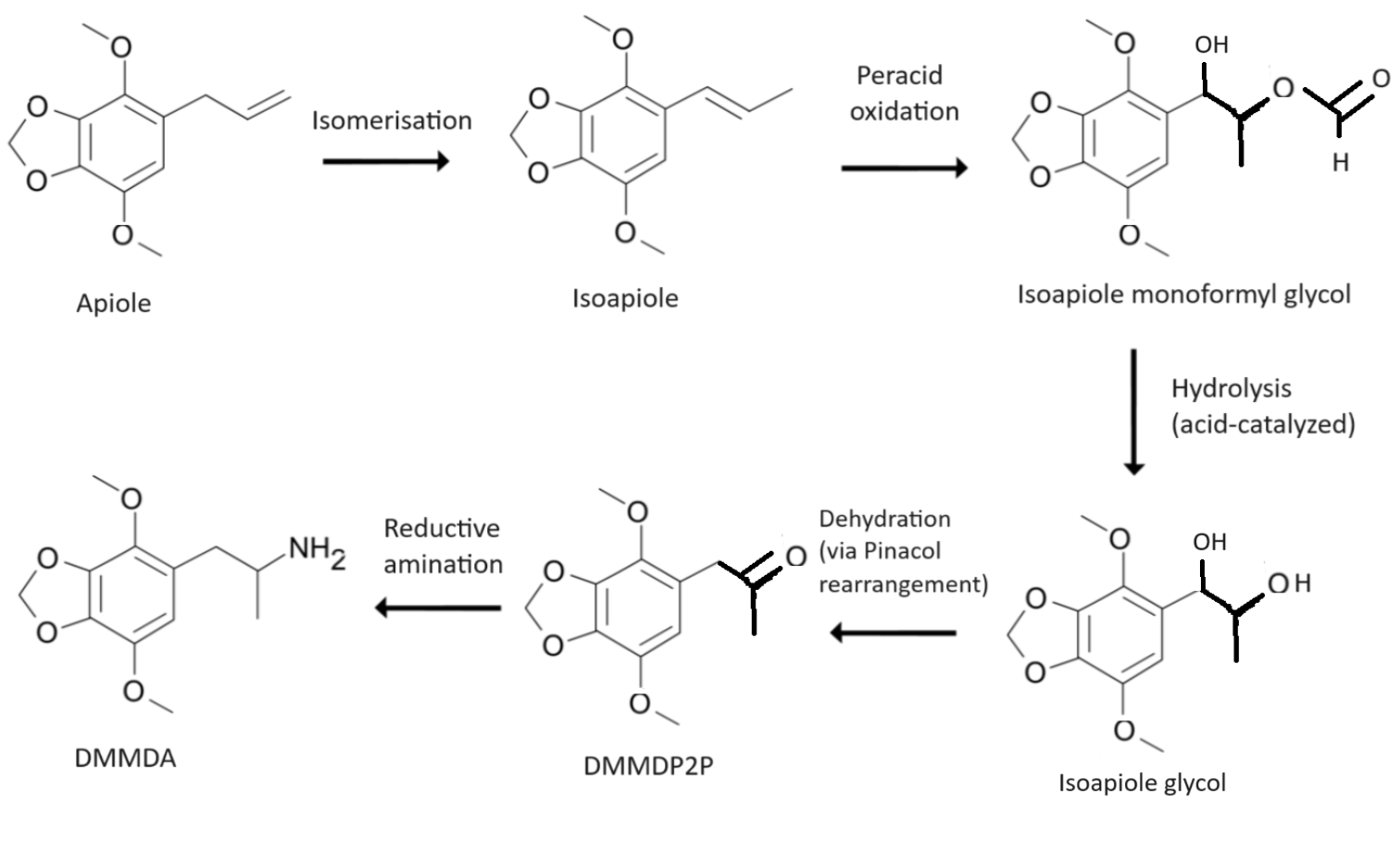
Alternative synthesis of DMMDA.

==== General synthetic information ====
Sodium borohydride usually is not used as a reducing agent due to it being much stronger than sodium cyanoborohydride; this usually results in side products in addition to DMMDA. Reductive aminations are exothermic reactions. Thus it is necessary to employ different methods of cooling the reaction mixture to prevent overheating; this can be accomplished by using a large amount of solvent or an ice bath, for example. The use of a mercury amalgam is unsafe due to mercury's well-known toxic effects on the central nervous system. In addition to peracetic acid, other peroxy acids can be used for the peroxy acid oxidation of isoapiole and other analogues of isoallylbenzene in general. For example, combining nitric acid with hydrogen peroxide would result in the same reaction.

== History ==
DMMDA was first described in the scientific literature by Alexander Shulgin and colleagues by 1967. Subsequently, it was described in greater detail by Shulgin in his book PiHKAL (Phenethylamines I Have Known and Loved) in 1991.

== Society and culture ==
=== Legal status ===
==== Canada ====
DMMDA is a controlled substance in Canada under phenethylamine blanket-ban language.

==== United States ====
DMMDA is not an explicitly controlled substance in the United States. However, it could be considered a controlled substance under the Federal Analogue Act if intended for human consumption.

== See also ==
- Substituted methylenedioxyphenethylamine
- Substituted methoxyphenethylamine
- Dimethoxymethylenedioxyamphetamine
- Methoxymethylenedioxyamphetamine
- 2,3,4,5-Tetramethoxyamphetamine (TeMA)
