= C12H14O4 =

The molecular formula C_{12}H_{14}O_{4} (molar mass: 222.23 g/mol, exact mass: 222.0892 u) may refer to:

- Apiole
- Blattellaquinone
- Diethyl phthalate
- Dillapiole
- Monobutyl phthalate
- Pseudodillapiole
