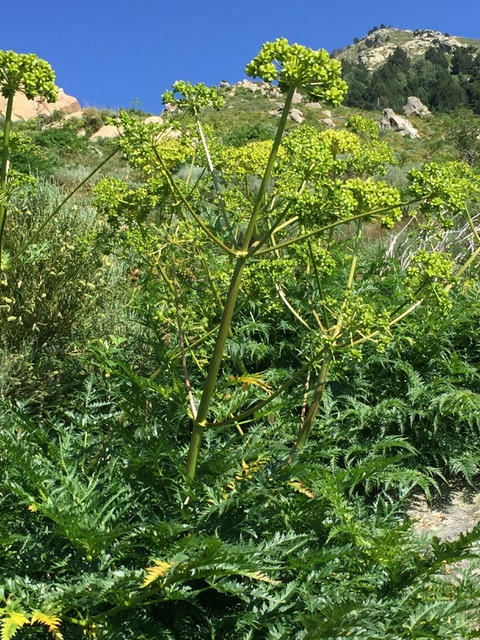

Scientific classification
- Kingdom: Plantae
- Clade: Embryophytes
- Clade: Tracheophytes
- Clade: Spermatophytes
- Clade: Angiosperms
- Clade: Eudicots
- Clade: Asterids
- Order: Apiales
- Family: Apiaceae
- Subfamily: Apioideae
- Tribe: Annesorhizeae
- Genus: Molopospermum; W.D.J.Koch
- Species: M. peleponnesiacum

Binomial name
- Molopospermum peleponnesiacum (L.) W.D.J.Koch

Synonyms
- Cicutaria Daubenton; Cicutaria peleponnesiaca (L.) Kuntze; Ligusticum peleponnesiacum L.

= Molopospermum =

Monotypic genus of flowering plants

Molopospermum is a monotypic genus of flowering plants belonging to the family Apiaceae. The single species, Molopospermum peleponnesiacum, Spanish: cuscullo, French couscouil and Rousillonais Catalan coscoll is native to the mountains of Spain, southern France and Italy (notably the Pyrenees and the Alps) and is edible, being used in ways similar to its better-known fellow umbellifers celery and angelica and also believed to have tonic properties.

== Taxonomy ==
The genus name is a combination of the Greek elements μώλωψ, genitive μώλωπος (môlôps, môlôpos) "bruise" and σπέρμα (sperma) "seed" yielding the meaning of "bruised-seed"—in reference not, as might be assumed, to the fruits being used to treat bruises, but to the long, deep grooves in the fruits resembling bruises—i.e. dents or furrows. The specific name peleponnesiacum is likewise misleading, appearing to suggest that the plant hails from the Peloponnese peninsula of southern Greece, which is not the case: the geographical epithet 'peleponnesiacum' was applied to the plant in error by the founding father of modern botany Linnaeus, who mistakenly believed the plant to be native to Greece. Linnaeus's error was noted by both Lamarck and de Candolle, who were unable to find the plant in Greece, but, despite the condemnation of these and subsequent botanists, the name has stuck, never having been replaced by a more appropriate one.

=== Affiliation within Apiaceae ===
Molopospermum is currently placed in tribe Annesorhizeae of subfamily Apioideae of the family Apiaceae (see List of Apiaceae genera) which currently contains the following six genera:

- Annesorhiza Cham. & Schltdl, endemic to southern Africa.
- Astydamia DC., endemic to Northwest Africa.
- Chamarea Eckl. & Zeyh., southern Africa.
- Ezosciadium B.L.Burtt, South African Republic.
- Itasina Raf., South African Republic.
- Molopospermum W.D.J.Koch

Subject to the proviso that the subfamilial and tribal classification for the family Apiaceae is currently in a state of some disarray (many of the groups being grossly paraphyletic or polyphyletic) it is still interesting to note some themes that emerge in the properties of the genera assigned to Annesorhizeae. The genus Annesorhiza, endemic to southern Africa, is of particular relevance in this context, various species being noted for their aromatic compound content and traditional culinary usage, with certain species being notable for containing allylbenzene derivatives such as nothoapiole.

== Etymology of common names ==
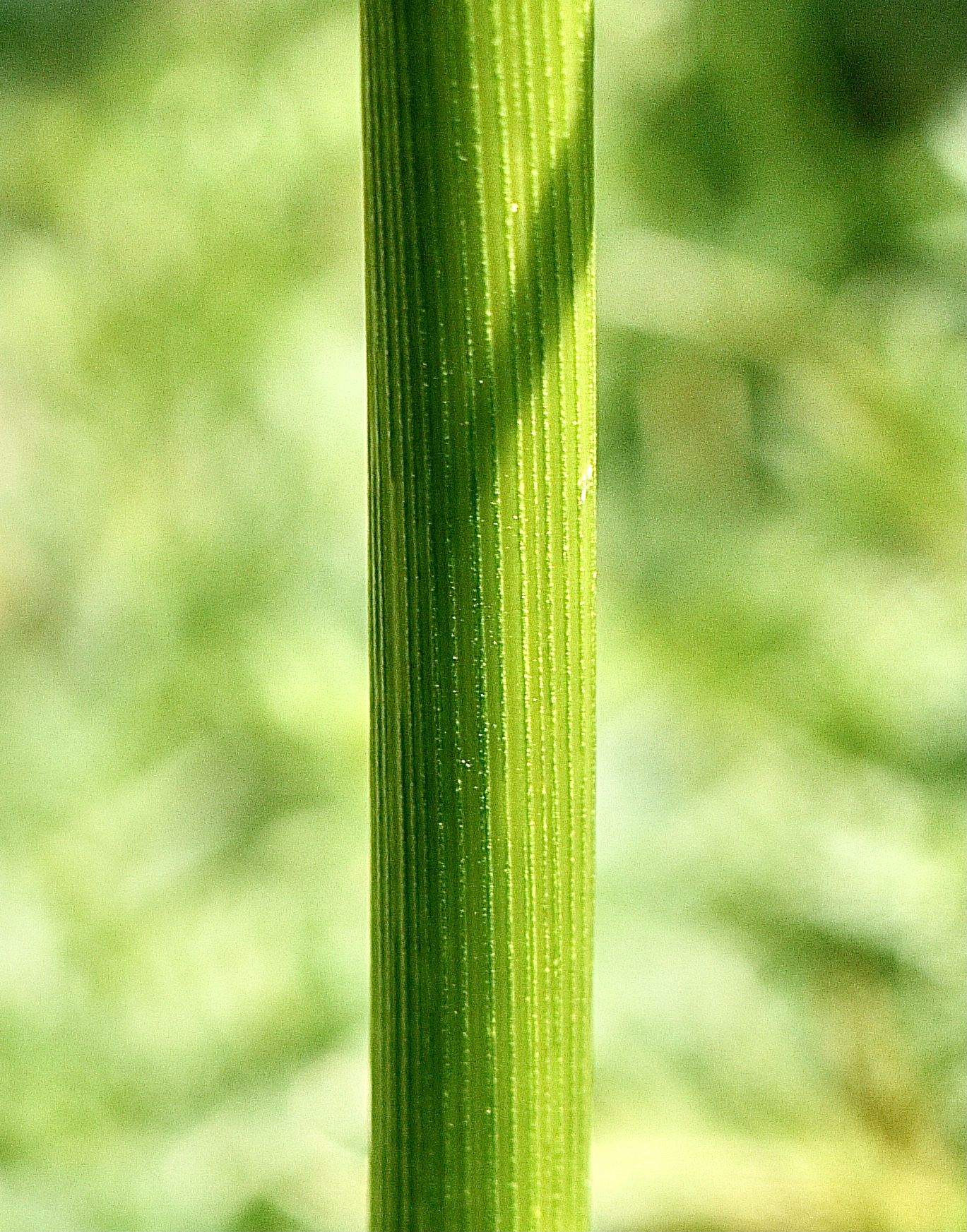
Finely striped main stem of M. peleponnesiacum (re. Slovenian name Progasti kobul)

The Spanish, Catalan and French names derive from the Latin cuscolium, a curious word of uncertain origin and uncertain original meaning. The cluster of meanings which scholars have invoked in trying to tease out its etymology involve the 1.) the berry-like kermes insect parasitic upon the kermes oak, yielding an ancient crimson dye 2.) oak and beech trees in general 3.) the herb Molopospermum and 4.) dry vegetable rubbish of various kinds, encompassing the concepts of "odds and ends", "leftovers" and "kindling". The word may be ultimately of Aquitanian (precursor of the non-Indo-European Basque) or Berber origin [Note: re. suitability for kindling of dried remains of previous year's growth of Molopospermum, see Gallery I image of Spring shoots emerging from these "leftovers"]

The Italian common name for the plant, cicutaria fetida ("stinking hemlock"), is more recent, deriving from an earlier botanical name.

The Slovenian vernacular name progasti kobul means "striped umbel" i.e. "umbel-bearing plant with a striped stalk", the Slovenian word for the family Apiaceae as a whole (formerly known as Umbelliferae) being kobulnice.

== Description ==
Molopospermum peleponnesiacum is a rather stout and strongly aromatic perennial umbellifer, attaining 100–150 cm in height and forming a mound of glossy, intricately divided and rather jaggedly cut foliage, above which are borne, in late Spring, umbels of flowers which are initially yellow in colour, turning gradually to cream, followed by brown, deeply ribbed, paired fruits (mericarps) resembling seeds. The foliage, while attractive, is rather short-lived, beginning to die down in late summer.

== Ornamental ==
Like a number of other robust umbellifers, the species is sometimes grown as an 'architectural plant', its shiny, fern-like foliage and attractive umbels of flowers lending an interesting textural element to the herbaceous border in early summer.

== Cultivation ==
Molopospermum peleponnesiacum thrives best in part shade in a well-drained but moisture-retentive soil with a pH preferably neutral to acid.

== Culinary herb and salad vegetable ==
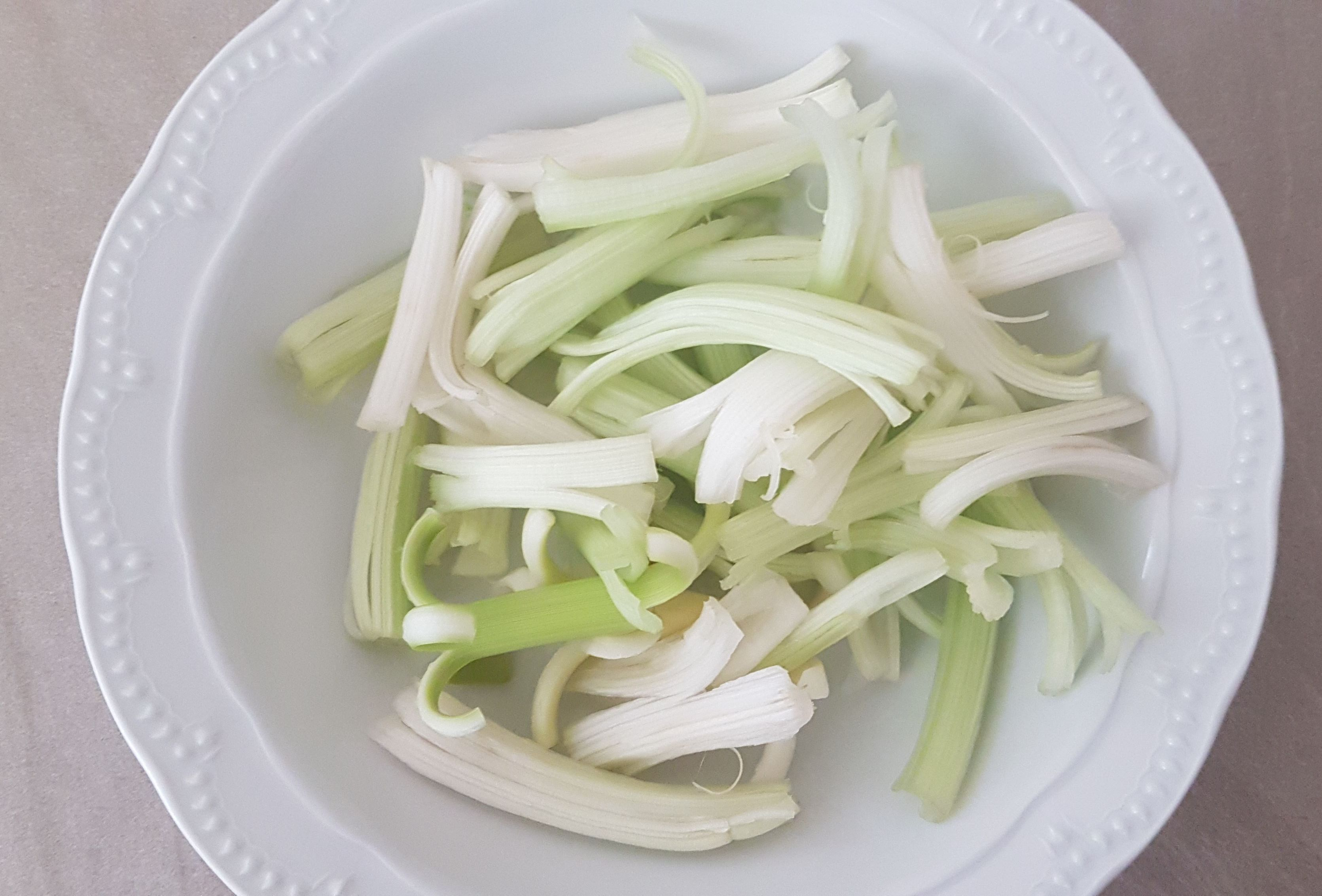
A dish of couscouils—the prepared edible shoots of M. peleponnesiacum—considered a delicacy in the cuisine of Northern Catalonia—as seen here in Vallespir

In Roussillon the young etiolated (blanched) shoots, known under the name of couscouils are gathered and eaten in salads, somewhat in the manner of celery

Augustin Pyramus de Candolle
Flore française
1815 (Translation)

It is eaten raw, in salad, being much sought after, despite its unique smell, which resembles that of a shield bug (French: punaise): commonly [but incorrectly] known as wild Angelica and in Catalan as coscoll.

Louis Companyo
Itinéraire...des Pyrénées-Orientales...
1845 (Translation)

The plant is edible: the young leaves and stems being used in the preparation of liqueurs or eaten fresh in salads in the Eastern Pyrenees. The parts of the plant most commonly eaten are the young petioles (leaf stalks), these being consumed in several different ways: most commonly in salads after being peeled and split into four, the four sections then being soaked in cool water prior to serving. These leaf stalks can also be macerated for a few days in alcohol, along with various other aromatics to make home-made herbal liqueurs of the Ratafia type—based usually, in the case of those prepared in the comarca of Alt Empordà, upon an alcoholic infusion of green walnuts. They were formerly also used in jam-making [recalling both the use of rhubarb petioles to make jam and the candying of Angelica stalks] but this culinary practice appears largely to have died out.

In the light of the peeling, blanching and soaking traditionally employed to render young Molopospermum shoots edible, it is unclear just how palatable and, indeed, how innocuous more mature plant parts might be: the observations made in the year 1842 by a certain Dr. Irving on the effects upon plants of blanching are, even now, apposite in this context:

When deprived of light...all plants nearly agree in the qualities of their juices. The most pungent vegetables then grow insipid; the highest flavoured, inodorous; and those of the most variegated colours are of a uniform whiteness. [...] The results of analysis perfectly accord with these observations; for etiolated plants are found to yield more saccharine matter, carbonic acid and water, and less inflammable matter than those which are green".

Companyo's somewhat derogatory comparison (quoted above) of the smell of Molopospermum foliage to that of a stink bug finds a parallel in a derogatory vernacular name applied to a much better-known culinary umbellifer: the pungent foliage of coriander—beloved of many, but hated by some—is also known as bug parsley—indeed the very name coriander derives probably from the Greek for "bedbug".

== Folk medicinal beliefs ==
"Coscoll" (Molopospermum peloponnesiacum (L.) Koch) whose stems are traditionally consumed raw in salads in Catalonia is associated in oral tradition with many virtues as digestive, purifying, exciting, antioxidant and hematocathartic activities. However, stem composition and biological activity had never been studied [hitherto].

It may be noted that several of the terms used for the above-claimed effects are lacking in precise—or indeed any—medical meaning, possible exceptions being "digestive" i.e. relieving flatulence and "exciting" which could signify (among other properties) stimulant or aphrodisiac. Many members of the plant family Apiaceae are indeed carminative, due to their aromatic essential oil content and there is some evidence to suggest that at least one other Apiaceous species—Cnidium monnieri—may possess aphrodisiac properties. The chemistry of Molopospermum suggests that it may possess psychostimulant properties related to its relatively high dillapiol content (see "Chemistry" below).

== Chemistry ==
M. peloponnesiacum contains a large number of volatile compounds and gives off a strong odor. Root and fruit essential oil have been identified in literature, containing mainly 3-carene, trimethylbenzoic acids, and dillapiol as major compounds...Main compounds identified in stem essential oil were dillapiol (60% relative content) and 3-carene (15% relative content). Stem essential oil composition was very close to the root essential oil composition determined in literature for dillapiol chemotype. Dillapiol is a well-known phenylpropanoid, extracted from essential oils of several plants as matico (Piper aduncum), parsley (Petroselinum crispum), pepper elder (Peperomia pellucida) or dill (Anethum graveolens). This compound presents in vitro antieishmanial, gastroprotective and anti-inflammatory activities. Its structure, close to phenylisopropylamine structures could suggest a possible psychotropic activity as tonic or exciting.

== Modern festival ==
Since the year 2008, the commune of Sahorre in the historical Catalan comarca of Conflent, Northern Catalonia (now part of France), has observed an annual coscoll (=Molopospermum) festival, held at the beginning of June, in honour of its local delicacy.

== Molopospermum and Aconitum: a potentially lethal confusion ==
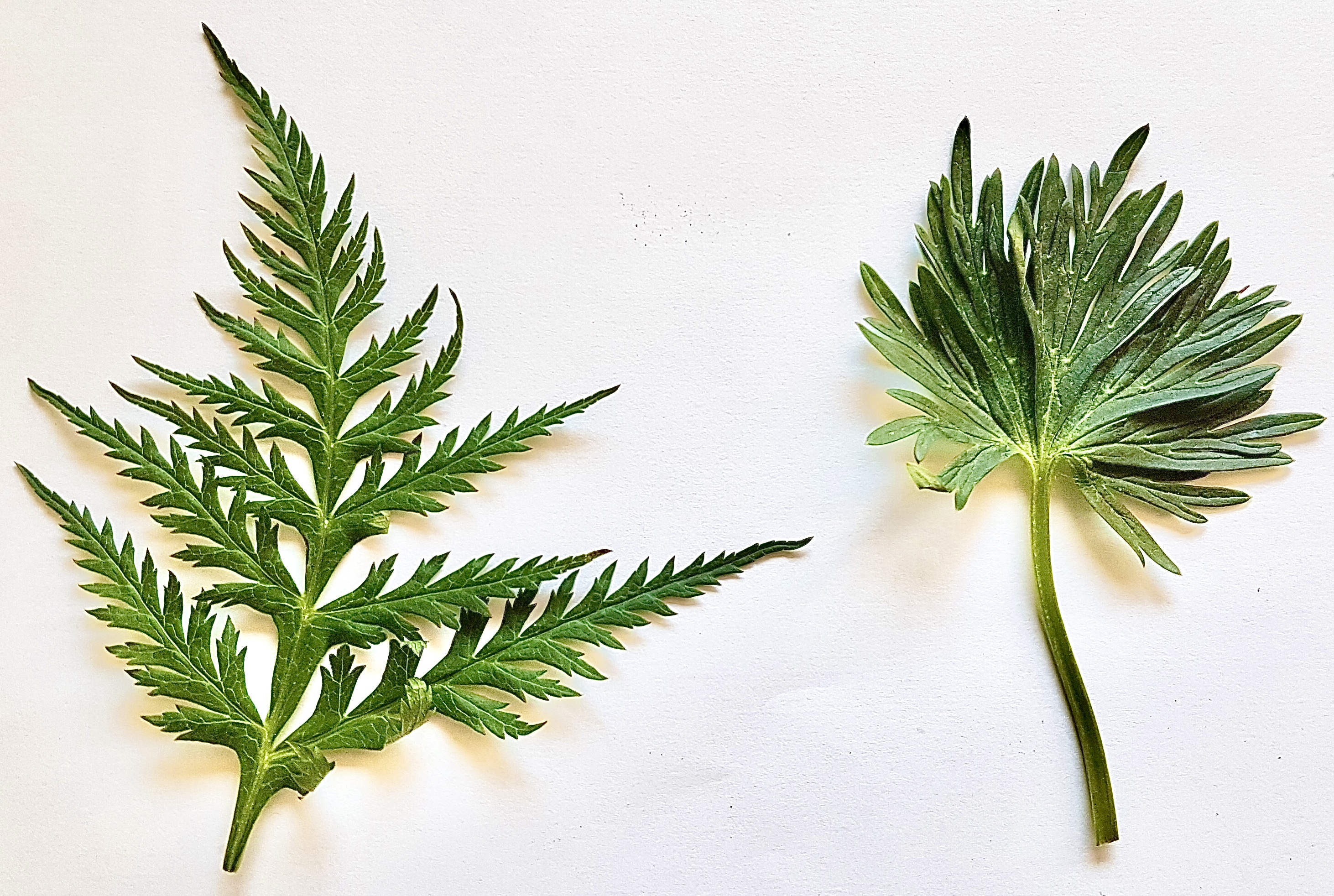
Comparison of leaves of M. peleponnesiacum (on the left) and Aconitum napellus (on the right)

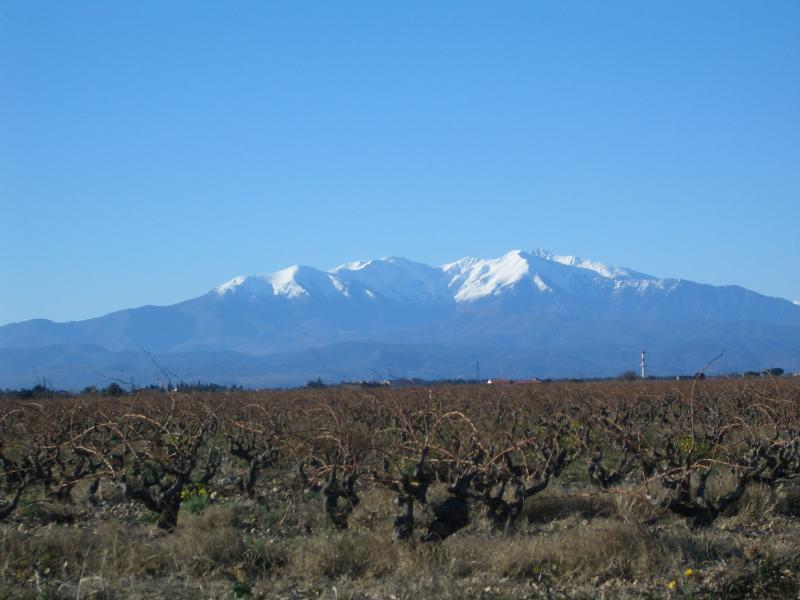
The Canigó, Catalonia's iconic mountain—scene of a case of fatal poisoning in which Aconitum was mistaken for Molopospermum

In the Eastern Pyrenees, a number of cases of fatal poisoning have occurred when the young leaves of the extremely toxic Aconitum napellus (Wolfsbane) were mistaken for those of Molopospermum by gatherers of edible wild plants. This potentially lethal confusion is only likely to occur in early Spring when the respective plants are not in flower, the flowers of the two species being completely different. As may be seen from the image appended, mature leaves are not especially similar to each other in shape and leaves of the two species are only likely to be confused if they be basal leaves or those borne by young shoots, which have yet to unfurl fully. Such tragic cases of accidental poisoning could account for the fact that, in certain areas, Molopospermum is not consumed, owing to the erroneous belief that it is poisonous—specifically that it is narcotic or even capable of causing serious illnesses, including gangrene.

== Gallery I Molopospermum ==
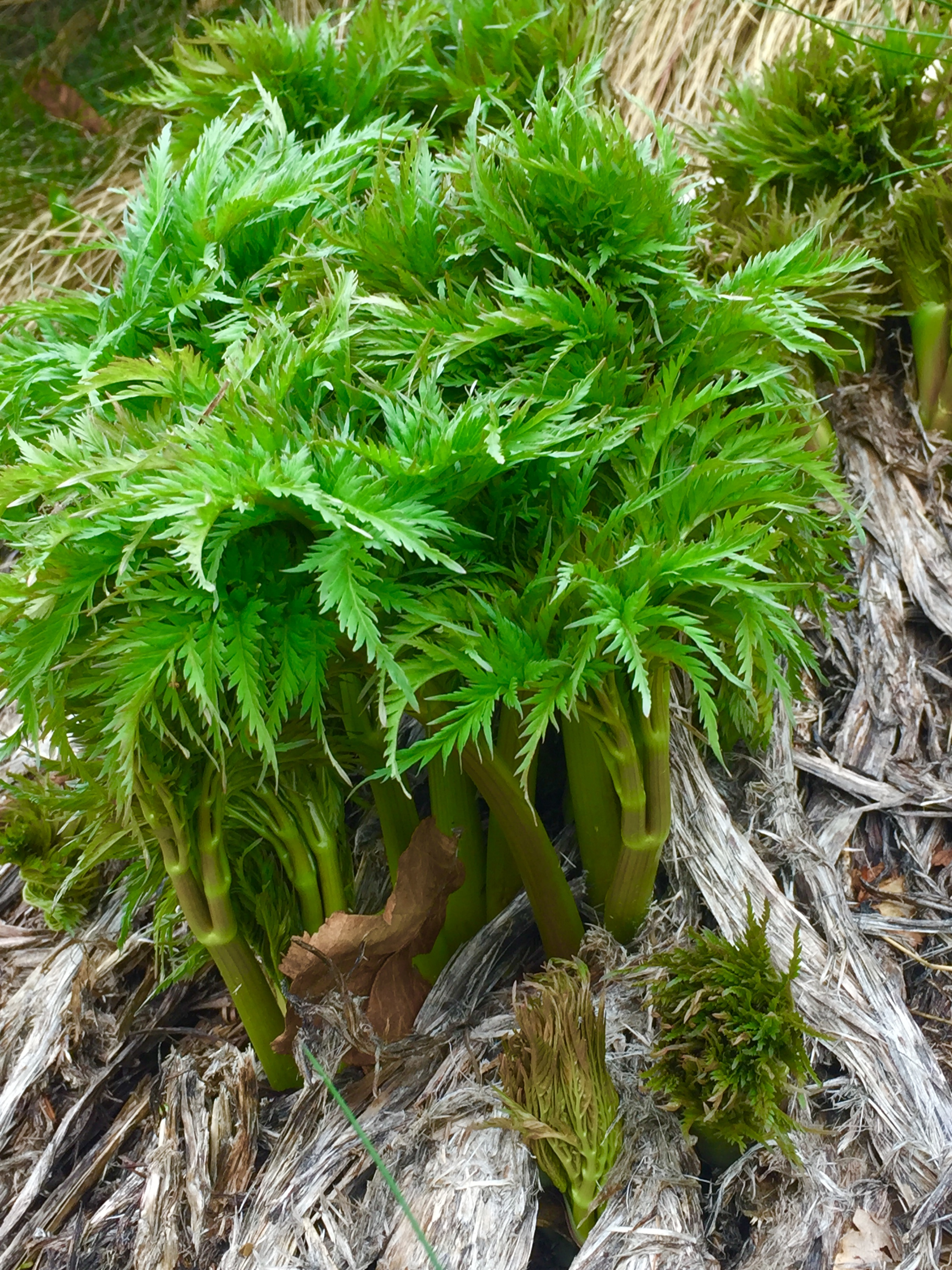
Edible green shoots emerging in Spring from dead leaf bases of previous years growth

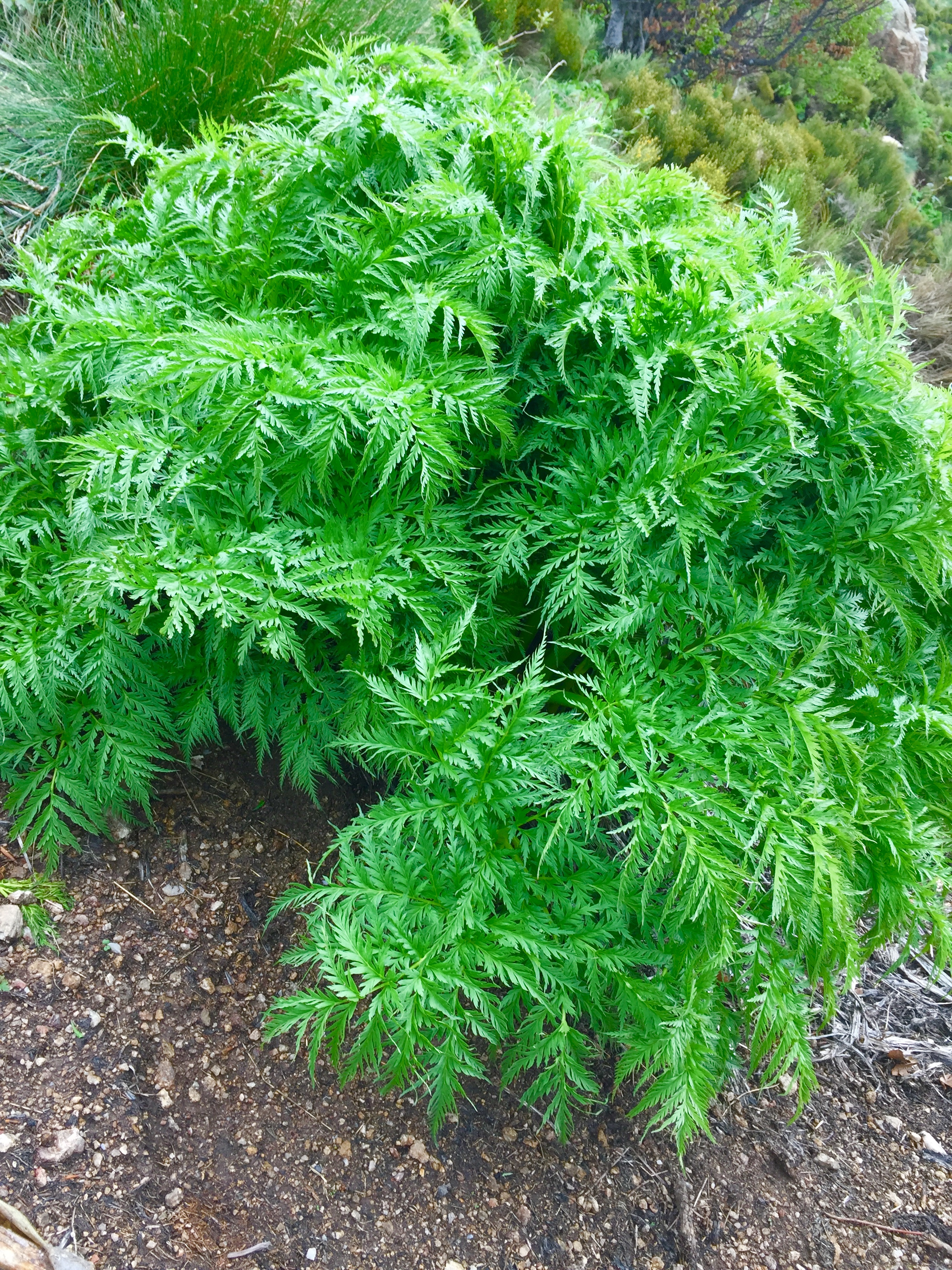
Mound of fresh, young foliage in early Summer, Prats-de-Mollo-la-Preste

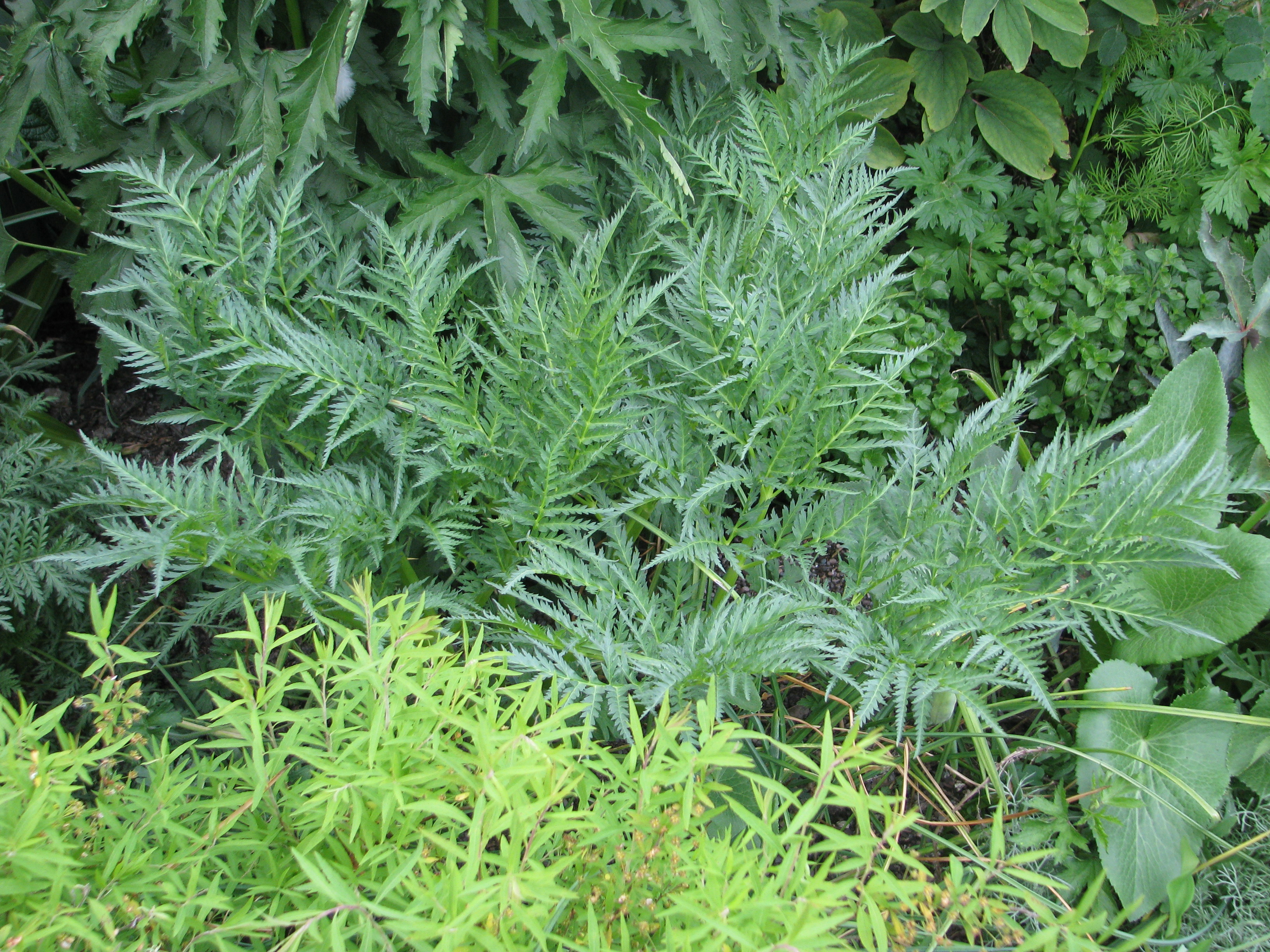
Deep green foliage of high Summer (cultivated plant)

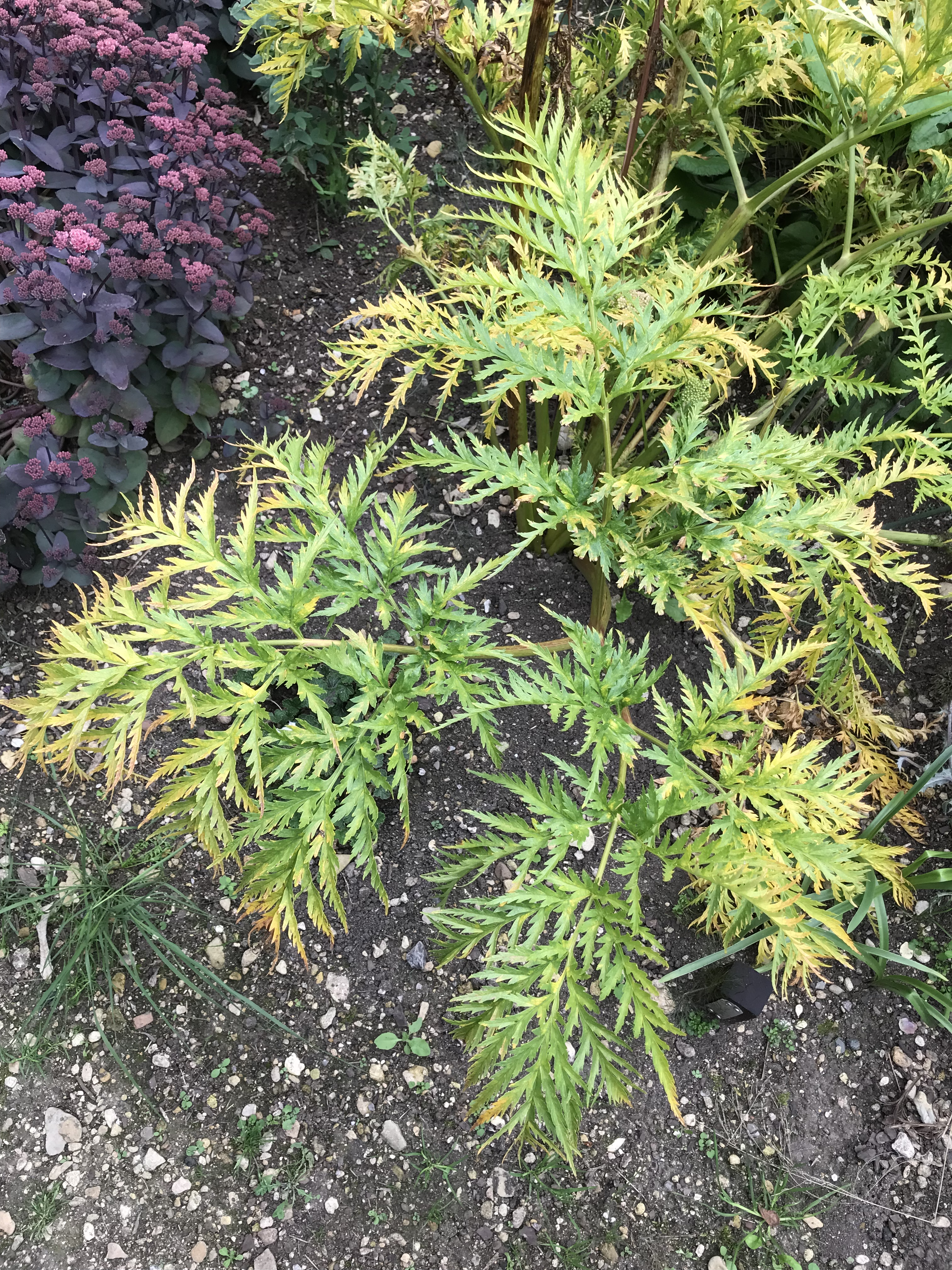
Foliage of a cultivated plant beginning to die back in late Summer, Frampton-on-Severn, Gloucestershire

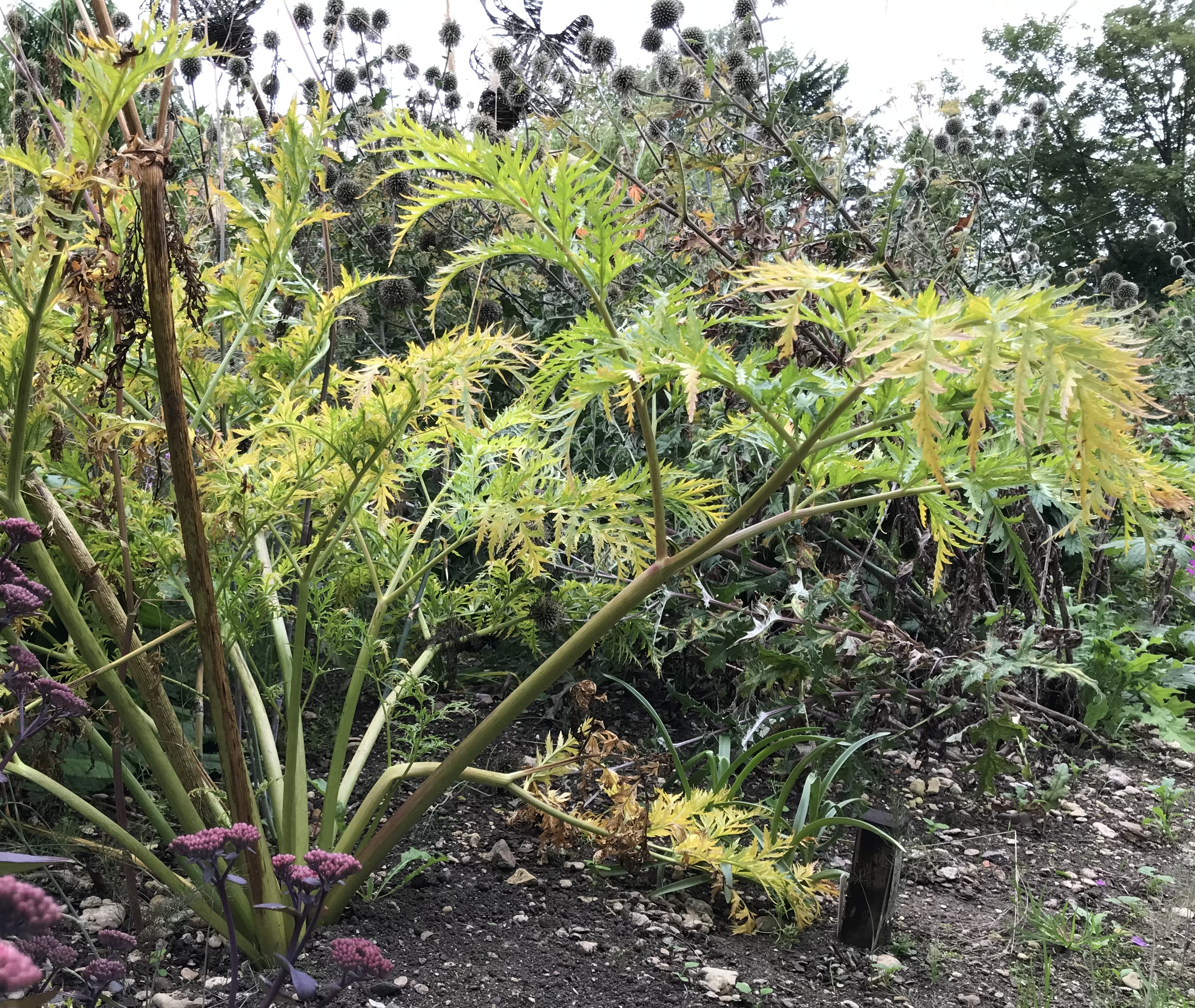
Side view of same senescent plant showing celery-like petioles

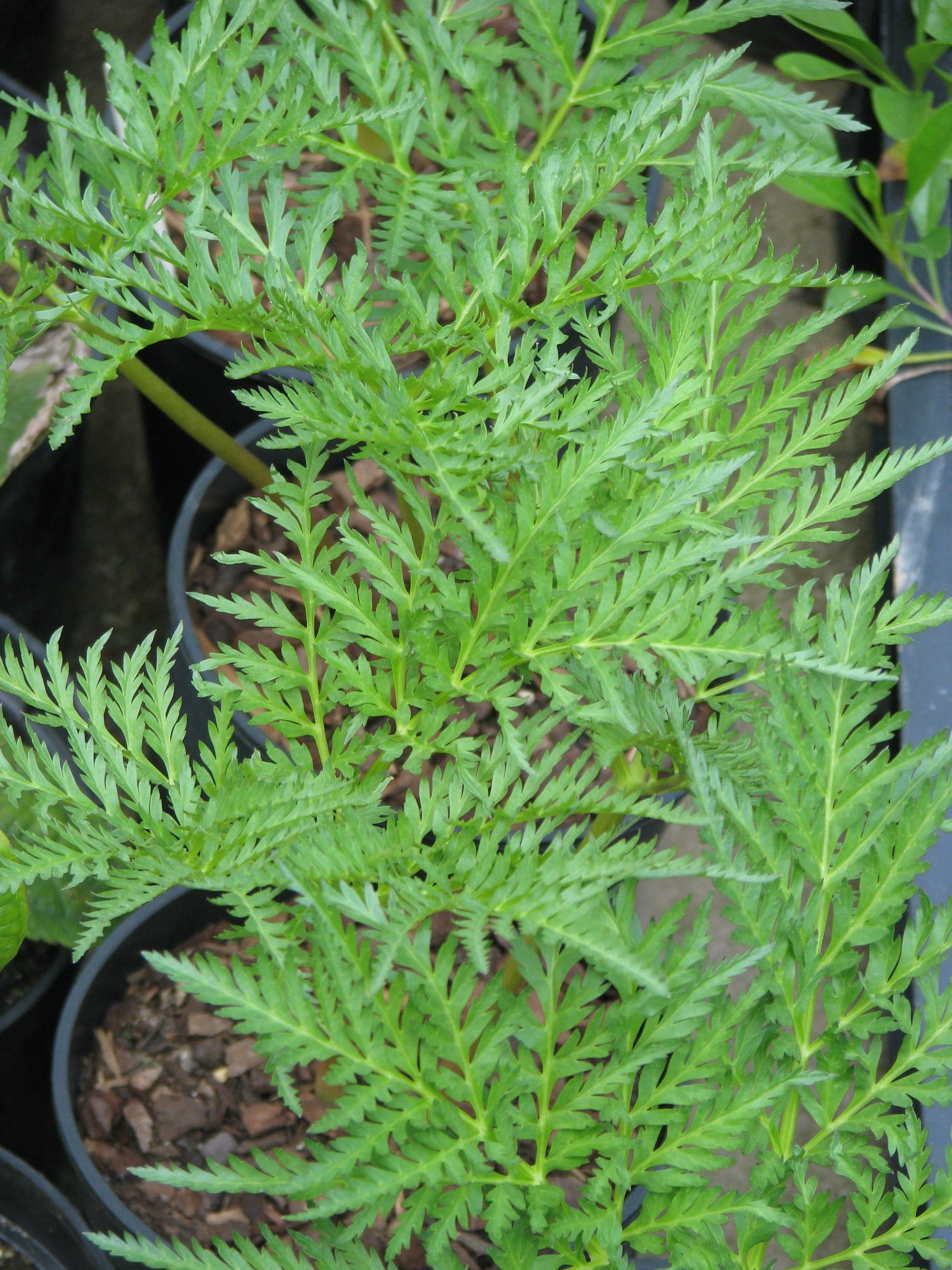
Attractive foliage of cultivated container plant

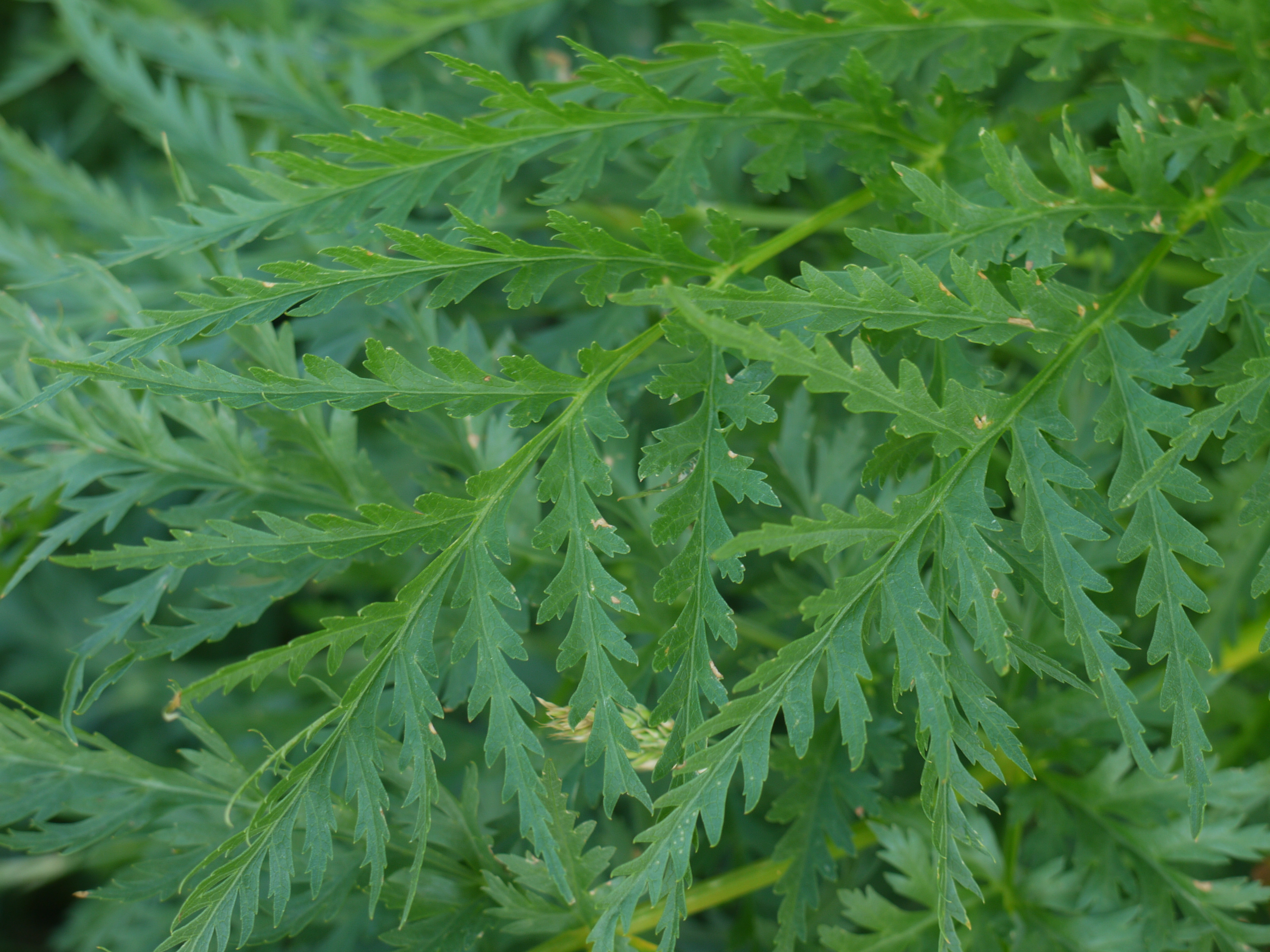
Close-up of leaflets of fern-like foliage

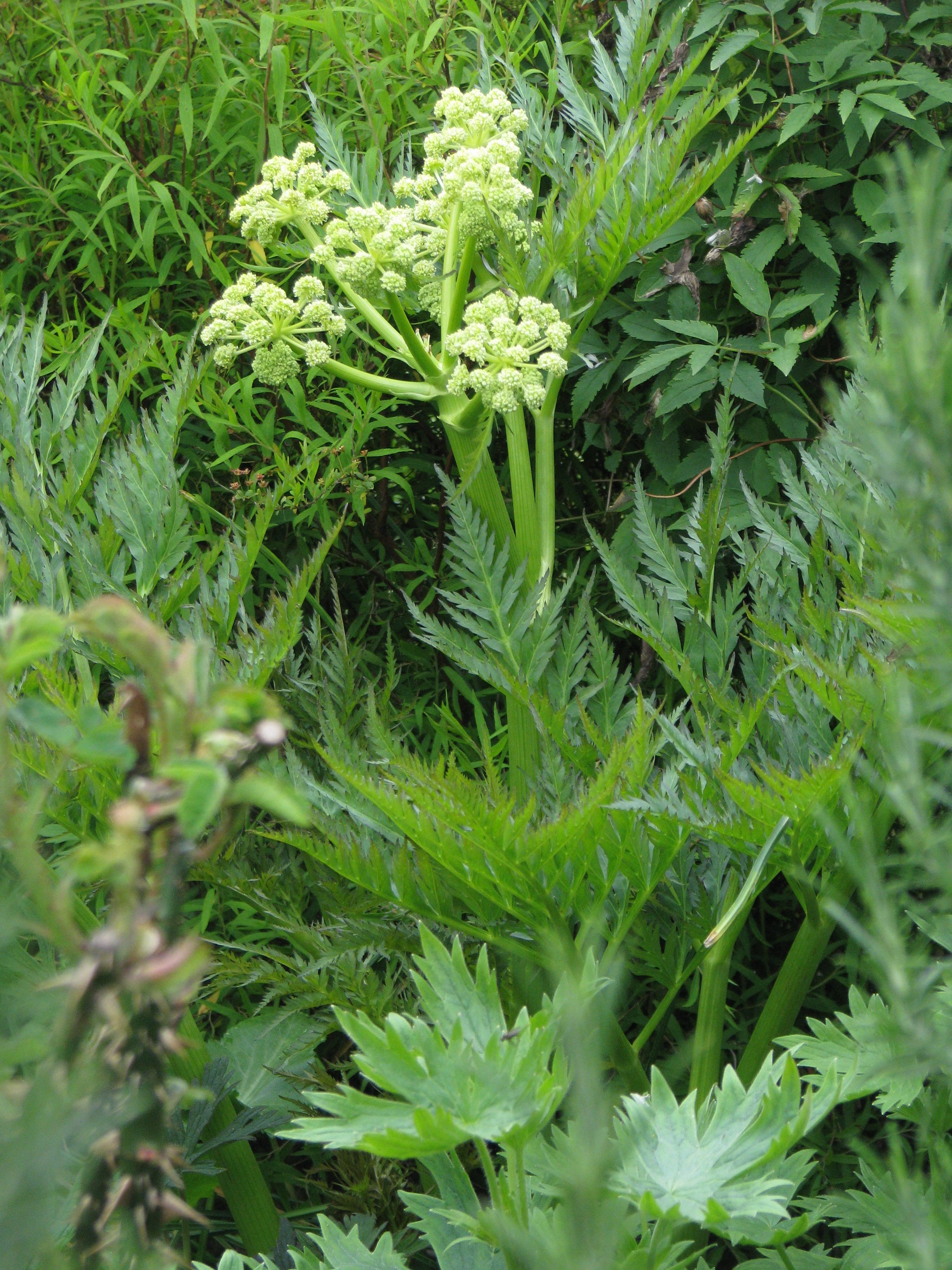
Young umbels of developing inflorescence

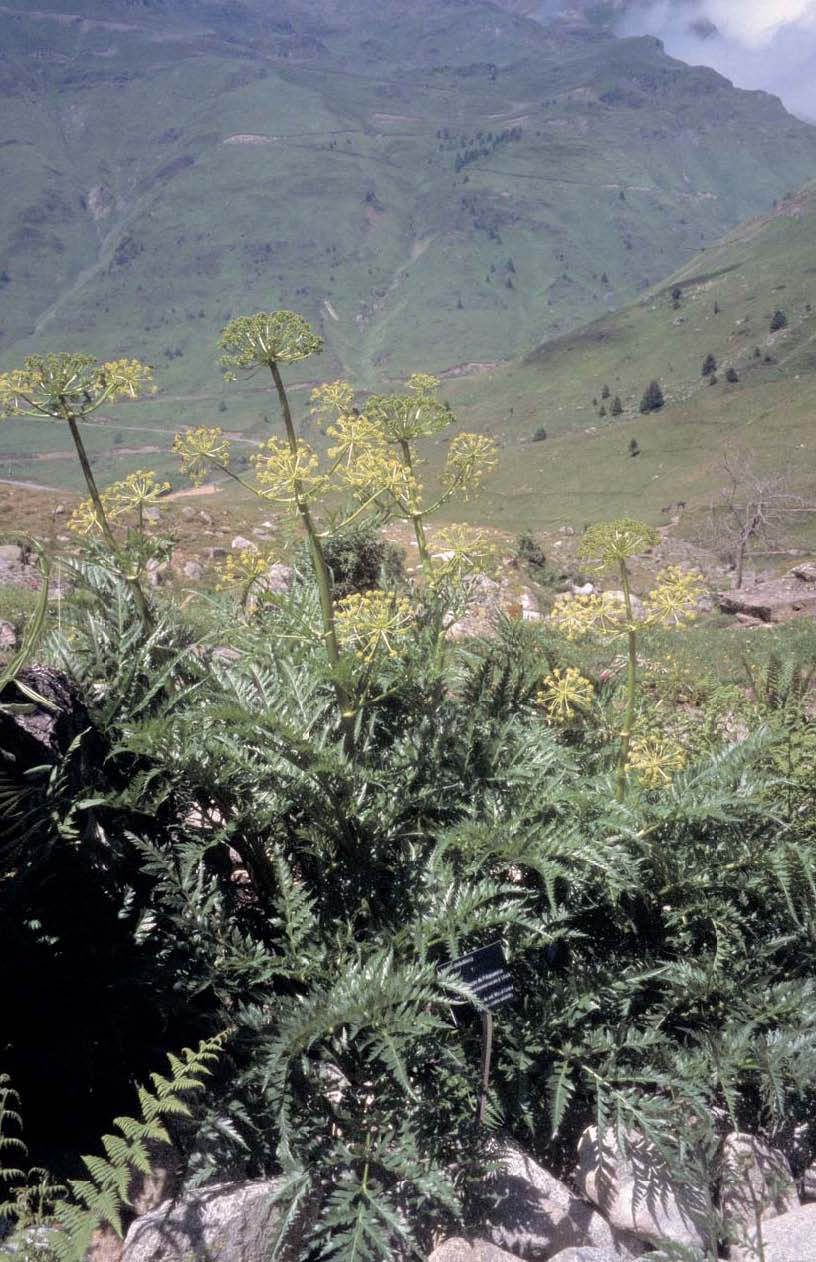
Flowering plant in the Jardin botanique du Tourmalet

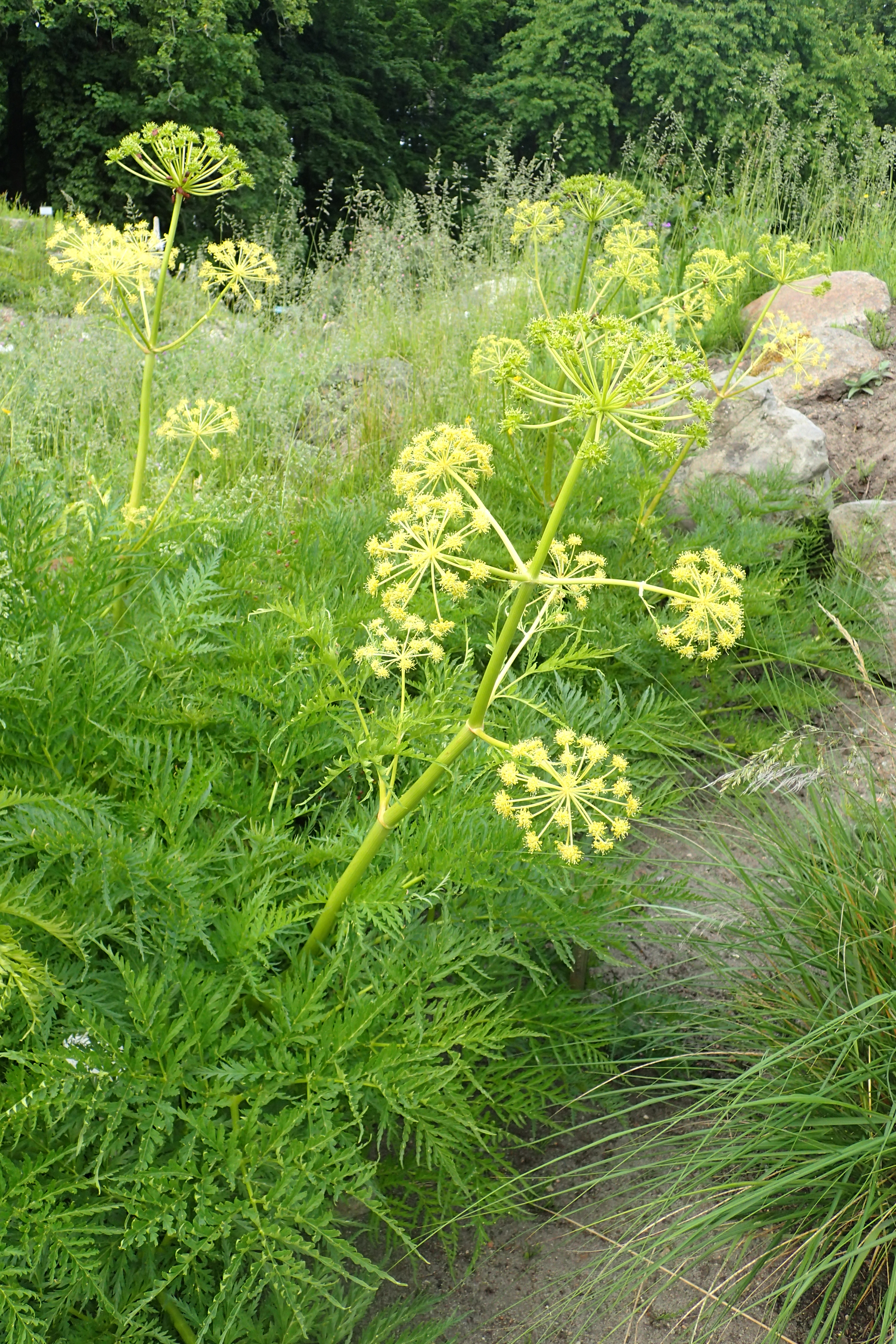
Mature plant in flower and fruit, Botanischer Garten Berlin-Dahlem

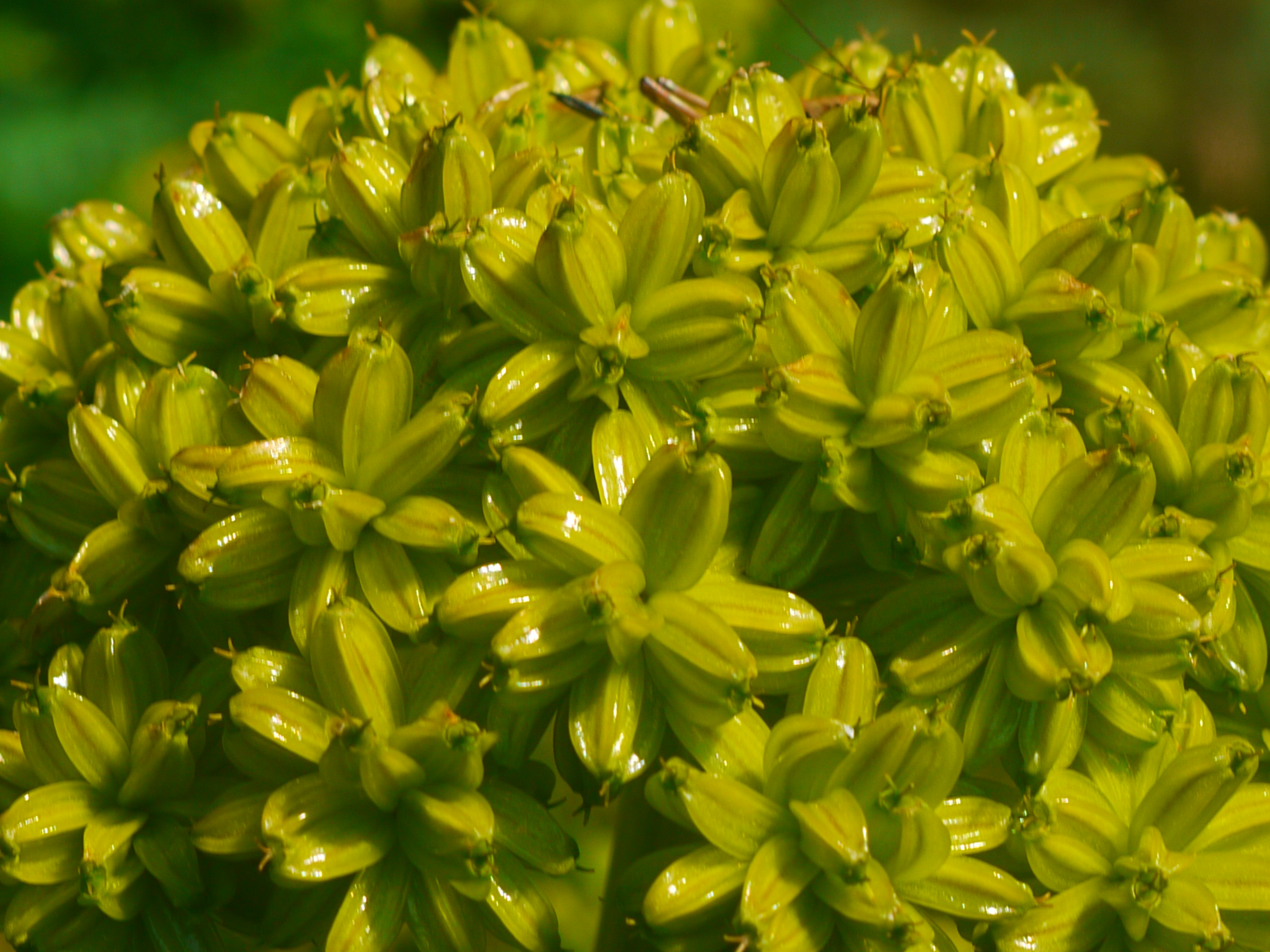
Umbel bearing glossy, unripe fruits

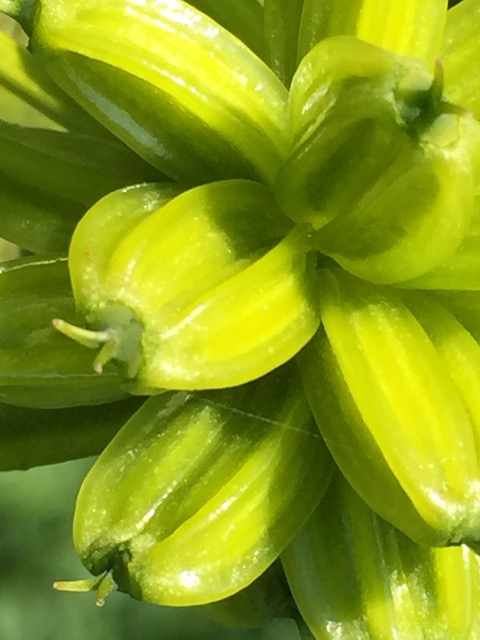
Unripe fruits in extreme close-up, showing bruise-like indentations referenced in name of genus

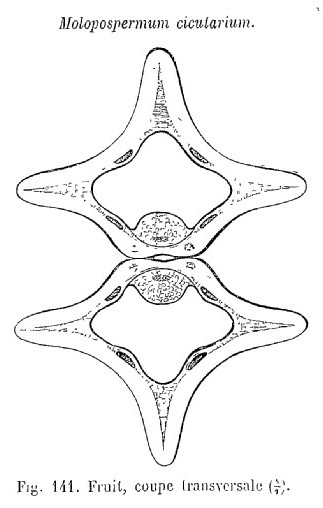
Plate depicting transverse section of fruit, showing broad furrows between prominent ribs

== Gallery II re. other meanings of Latin "Cuscolium" ==
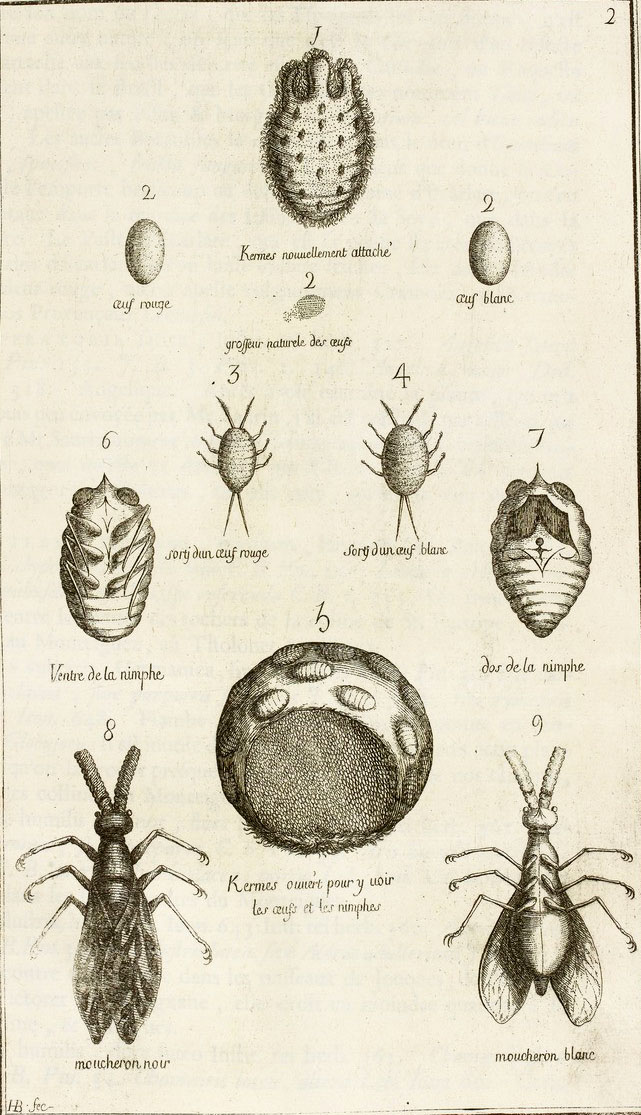
"Cuscolium": stages in the life-cycle of Kermes vermilio the kermes scale insect, source of the original crimson dye

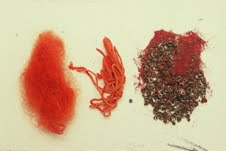
"Cuscolium" ("oddments") of kermes insects and wool dyed with them

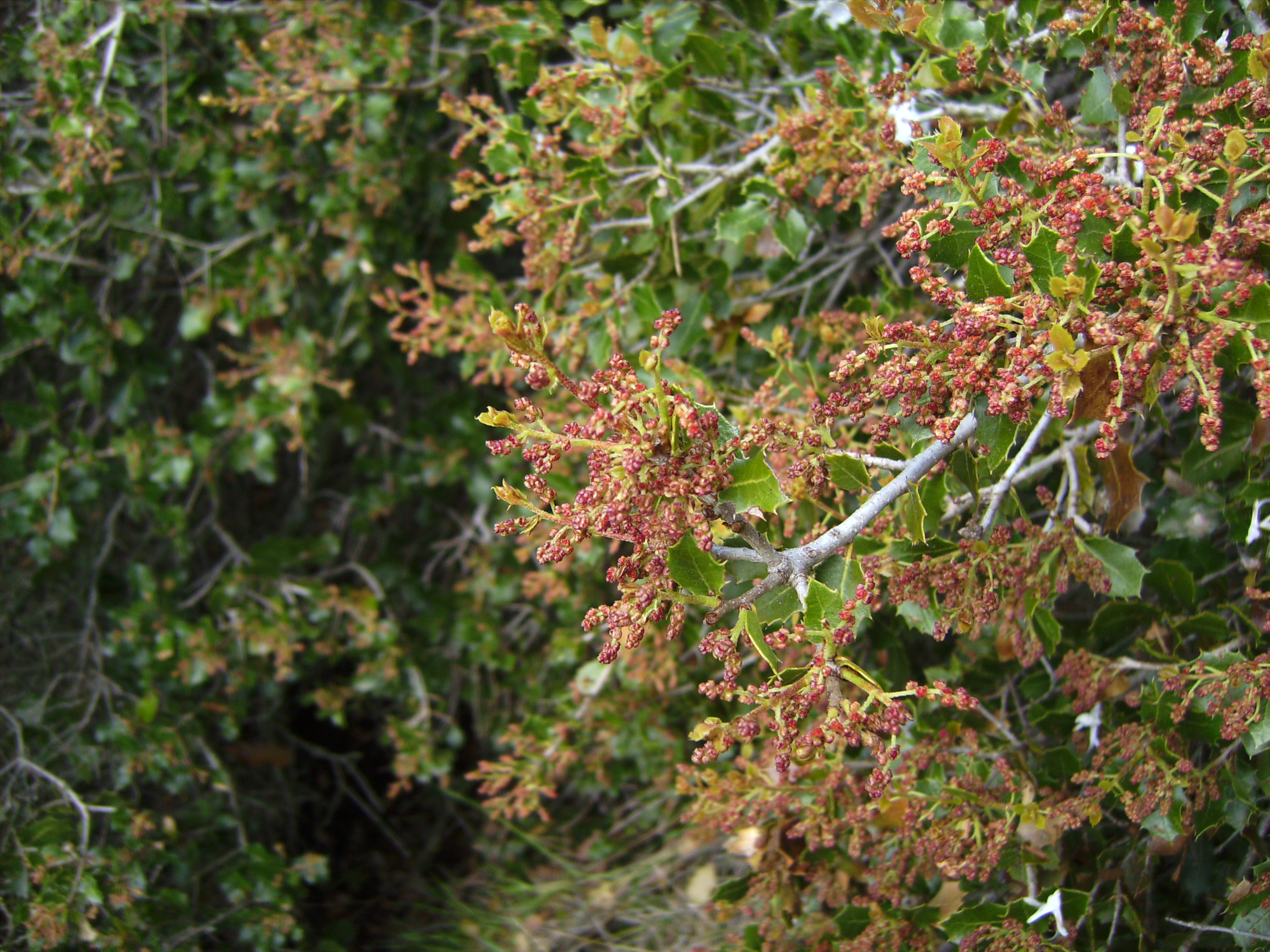
"Cuscolium" the kermes oak, here displaying red flower buds

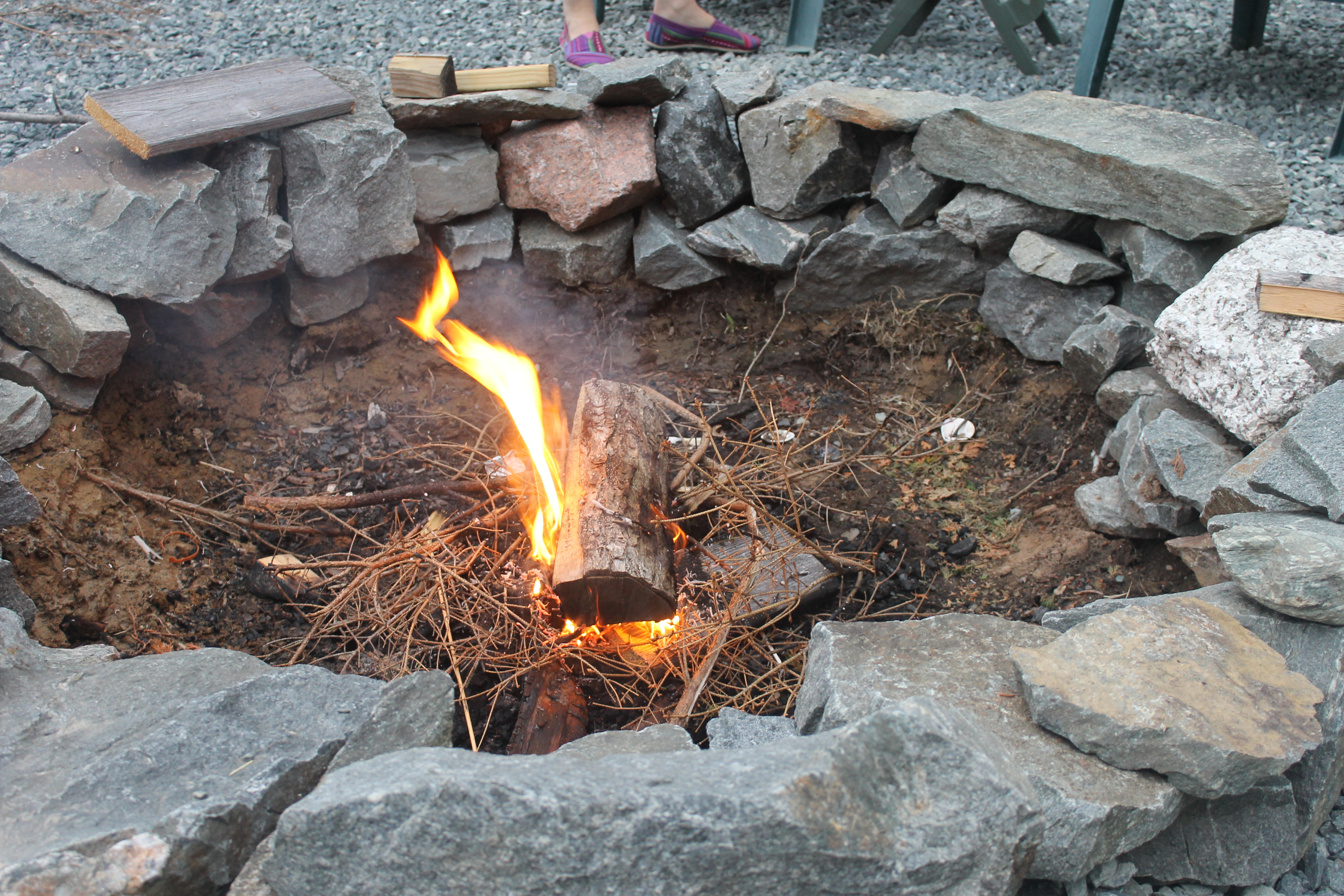
"Cuscolium" fine twigs and other dry organic detritus suitable for kindling
