= Nothoapiole =

Names
- Preferred IUPAC name 4,5,7-Trimethoxy-6-(prop-2-en-1-yl)-2H-1,3-benzodioxole
- Other names 2,3,6-Trimethoxy,4,5-methylenedioxy-allylbenzene; 1,3-Benzodioxole, 4,5,7-trimethoxy-6-(2-propen-1-yl)-

Identifiers
CAS Number	22934-74-3
3D model (JSmol)	Interactive image
ChemSpider	161286
PubChem CID	185518
UNII	U5MRY34GEB
CompTox Dashboard (EPA)	DTXSID30945617
- InChI: InChI=1S/C13H16O5/c1-5-6-8-9(14-2)11(16-4)13-12(10(8)15-3)17-7-18-13/h5H,1,6-7H2,2-4H3 Key: IWGPXDGGZYMDJF-UHFFFAOYSA-N; InChI=1S/C13H16O5/c1-5-6-8-9(14-2)11(16-4)13-12(10(8)15-3)17-7-18-13/h5H,1,6-7H2,2-4H3
- SMILES: COC1=C(C(=C(C2=C1OCO2)OC)OC)CC=C

Properties
Chemical formula	C_{13}H_{16}O_{5}
Molar mass	252.266 g·mol^{−1}
- Except where otherwise noted, data are given for materials in their standard state (at 25 °C [77 °F], 100 kPa). Infobox references

Nothoapiole is a phenylpropene, a natural organic compound present in the essential oil of Perilla frutescens from Jeju Island in Korea and the major component of the essential oil obtained from the roots of Pleurospermum angelicoides Benth. It is also found in the essential oil of black caraway (Carum bulbocastanum) fruits and Carum nigrum.

This highly oxygenated phenylpropanoid, previously reported in a few Carum species, is structurally and biogenetically related to myristicin, apiole and dillapiole.

== See also ==
- Elemicin
- Myristicin
- Apiole
- Dillapiole
