= DMMDA-2 =

Psychedelic drug

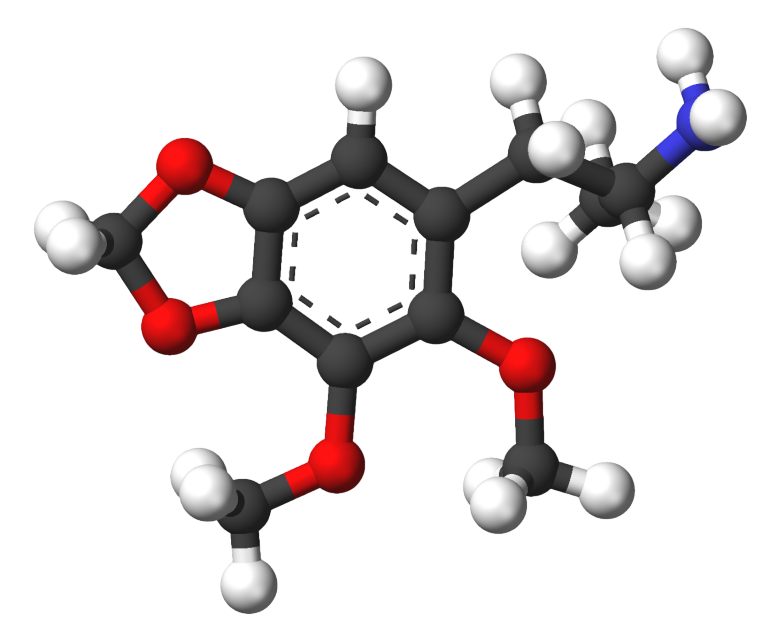

Clinical data
- Other names: 2,3-Dimethoxy-4,5-methylenedioxyamphetamine; 5,6-Dimethoxy-MDA; 3,4-Methylenedioxy-5,6-dimethoxyamphetamine; 5,6-Dimethoxy-3,4-methylenedioxyamphetamine
- Routes of administration: Oral
- Drug class: Serotonergic psychedelic; Hallucinogen; Serotonin releasing agent
- ATC code: None

Pharmacokinetic data
- Duration of action: Unknown

Identifiers
- IUPAC name: 1-(6,7-dimethoxy-2H-1,3-benzodioxol-5-yl)propan-2-amine
- CAS Number: 15183-26-3
- PubChem CID: 16766527
- ChemSpider: 21106292
- UNII: EPG4XUJ647
- ChEMBL: ChEMBL424156
- CompTox Dashboard (EPA): DTXSID00587947

Chemical and physical data
- Formula: C_{12}H_{17}NO_{4}
- Molar mass: 239.271 g·mol^{−1}
- 3D model (JSmol): Interactive image
- Melting point: 178 to 180 °C (352 to 356 °F)
- SMILES: CC(N)Cc1cc2OCOc2c(OC)c1OC
- InChI: InChI=1S/C12H17NO4/c1-7(13)4-8-5-9-11(17-6-16-9)12(15-3)10(8)14-2/h5,7H,4,6,13H2,1-3H3; Key:UQXNREZPUUGSKM-UHFFFAOYSA-N

DMMDA-2, also known as 2,3-dimethoxy-4,5-methylenedioxyamphetamine or as 5,6-dimethoxy-MDA, is a psychedelic drug of the phenethylamine, amphetamine, and MDxx families related to MDA. It is the derivative of MDA with methoxy groups at the 5 and 6 positions and of MMDA and MMDA-2 with an additional methoxy group at either of these positions.

== Use and effects ==
In his book PiHKAL (Phenethylamines I Have Known and Loved), Alexander Shulgin lists DMMDA-2's dose as about 50 mg orally and its duration as unknown. Threshold effects are said to occur at a dose of 28 mg (~0.4 mg/kg) or 30 to 50 mg orally. In earlier publications, Shulgin listed its dose range as approximately 0.6 to 1 mg/kg (or ~42–70 mg for a 70-kg person) orally. In a subsequent publication, he listed its dose as greater than 50 mg orally.

Information on the properties and effects of DMMDA-2 in humans is sparse and its specific effects were not described, but it has been said to be "much like MDA" and to have similar effects as DMMDA. The effects of DMMDA and DMMDA-2 may reportedly be different from those of other related psychedelics like mescaline, MMDA, and MMDA-2. DMMDA-2 has approximately 5 times the potency of mescaline. It is more potent than MDA but less potent than DMMDA.

== Pharmacology ==
=== Pharmacodynamics ===
DMMDA-2 showed reduced albeit significant activity as a serotonin releasing agent compared to certain related compounds like MDA and MMDA. It showed no activity as a dopamine releasing agent, in contrast to MDA but similarly to MMDA and MMDA-2. Whereas DMMDA-2 significantly induced serotonin release, MMDA-2 was inactive in terms of serotonin and dopamine release induction.

== Chemistry ==
=== Synthesis ===
The chemical synthesis of DMMDA-2 has been described. It can be synthesized from dillapiole.

=== Analogues ===
A variety of positional isomers of DMMDA-2 are possible and/or known, such as DMMDA among others. Other analogues of DMMDA-2 are also known, such as MMDA-2 among others.

== History ==
DMMDA-2 was first described in the scientific literature by Alexander Shulgin and colleagues in 1967. However, Shulgin did not synthesize or test it himself. Subsequently, the drug was described in greater detail by Shulgin in PiHKAL in 1991.

== Society and culture ==
=== Legal status ===
DMMDA-2 is a controlled substance in Canada under phenethylamine blanket-ban language.

== See also ==
- Substituted methylenedioxyphenethylamine
- Substituted methoxyphenethylamine
- Dimethoxymethylenedioxyamphetamine
- Methoxymethylenedioxyamphetamine
