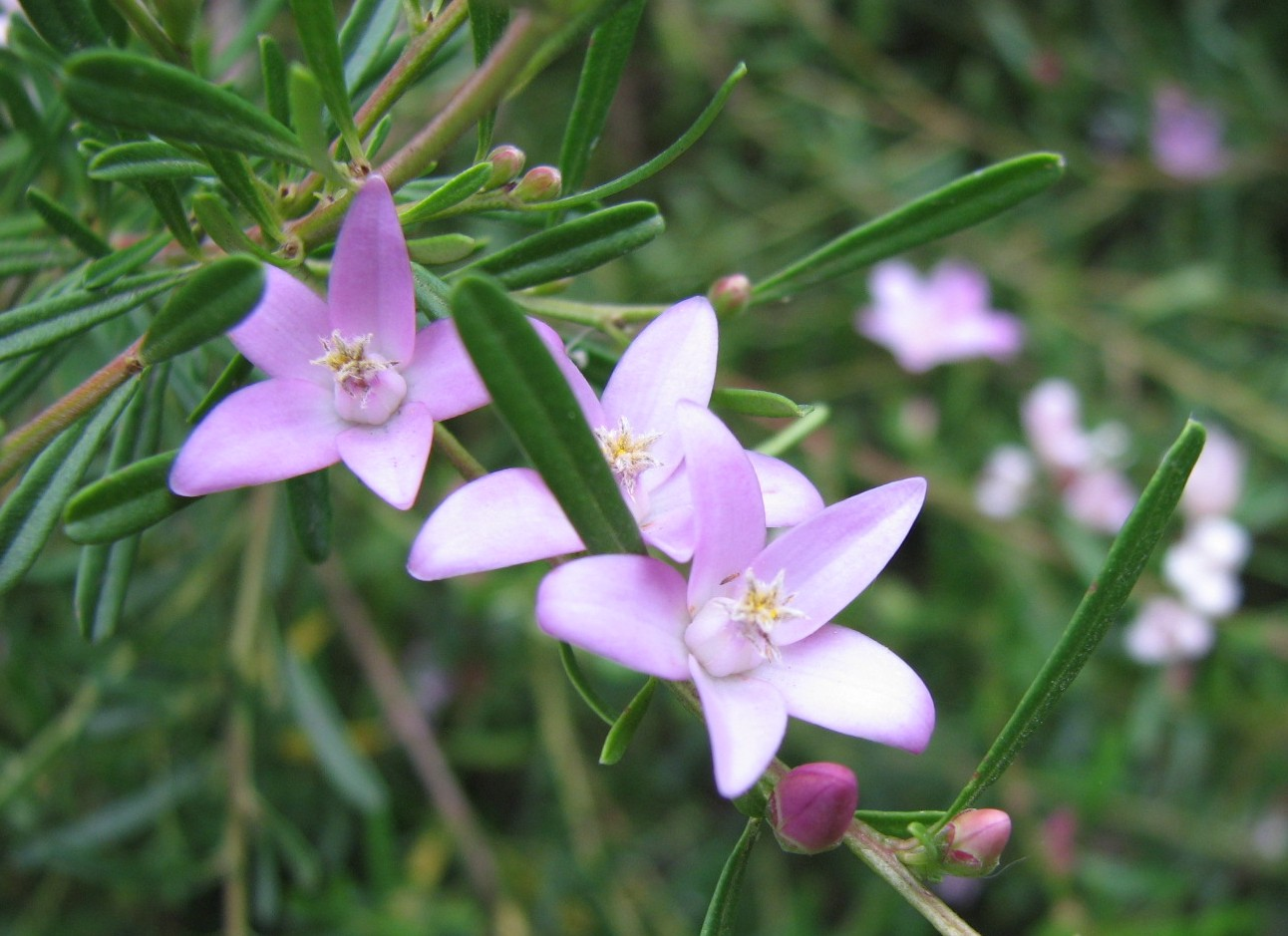
- Crowea exalata

Scientific classification
- Kingdom: Plantae
- Clade: Tracheophytes
- Clade: Angiosperms
- Clade: Eudicots
- Clade: Rosids
- Order: Sapindales
- Family: Rutaceae
- Subfamily: Zanthoxyloideae
- Genus: Crowea; Sm.

Type species
- Crowea saligna Andrews

Species
- C. angustifolia Sm.; C. exalata F.Muell.; C. saligna Andrews

Synonyms
- Crowea sect. Eucrowea Baill. nom. inval.; Eriostemon sect. Crowea (Sm.) F.Muell.

= Crowea =

Genus of flowering plants

Crowea is a genus of three species of small evergreen shrubs in the family Rutaceae, commonly known as waxflowers. The genus also includes many subspecies and cultivars. All three species are endemic to Australia and occur in Victoria, New South Wales and Western Australia. They are widely cultivated as ornamental plants for their abundant flowers, which often appear during autumn and winter.

== Description ==
Species of Crowea are evergreen shrubs that grow to about 1.5 m (4.9 ft) high. The leaves are simple, glabrous and, like those of other members of the Rutaceae, contain aromatic oil glands. The flowers are borne singly in the leaf axils. They are pink and star-shaped, with five petals, five sepals and ten stamens arranged in two rings around the ovary. Crowea is closely related to other genera in the family Rutaceae, particularly Philotheca, Eriostemon and Boronia, whose flowers are similar in appearance.

== Taxonomy and naming ==
The genus was described and named by James Edward Smith in 1798 and was named "to honour James Crowe esq., F.L.S. of Lakenham, near Norwich, who died Jan 16, 1807 aged 56. This gentleman was extremely well versed in the botany of Britain, more especially in the genus Salix, to which he paid particular attention, having collected and cultivated all the species he could possibly procure. The specific name of the original species, Crowea saligna alludes to Mr. Crowe's merits in this department".

The three species are accepted by the Australian Plant Census as at November 2020:

- Crowea angustifolia Sm. - Western Australia
- Crowea exalata F.Muell. - Queensland, New South Wales, Australian Capital Territory and Victoria
- Crowea saligna Andrews - New South Wales

== Propagation and cultivation ==
Croweas are hardy in cultivation, moderately tolerant of frost, growing best in a well-drained mulch in partial shade. Propagation is easiest from cuttings.

== In popular culture ==
Crowea is the title of a waltz composed 1919 by Western Australian musician Fred Barwick.
