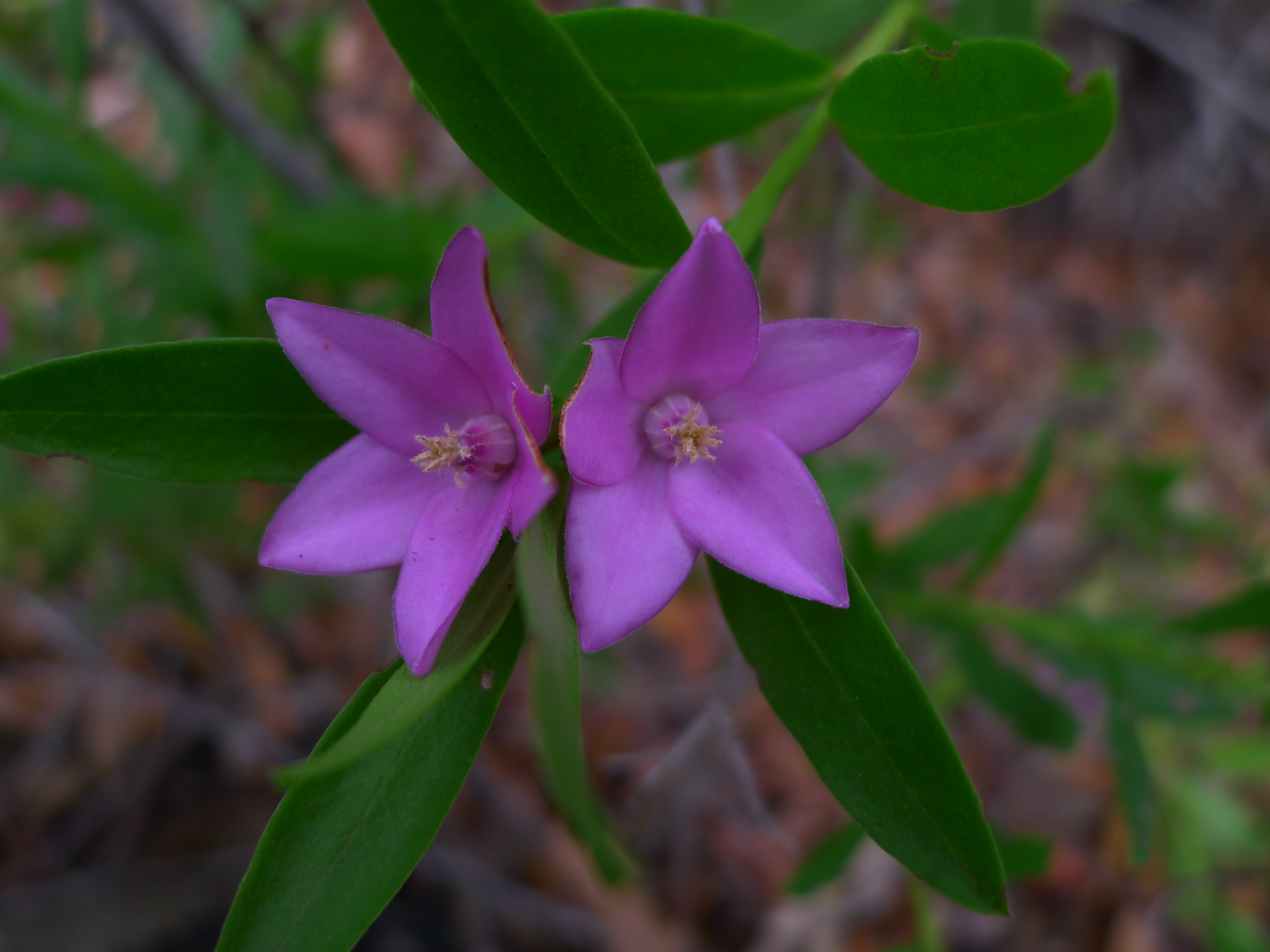
- In the Royal National Park

Scientific classification
- Kingdom: Plantae
- Clade: Tracheophytes
- Clade: Angiosperms
- Clade: Eudicots
- Clade: Rosids
- Order: Sapindales
- Family: Rutaceae
- Genus: Crowea
- Species: C. saligna

Binomial name
- Crowea saligna Andrews

Synonyms
- List: Crowea latifolia Lodd. ex G.Don; Crowea macrantha Hérincq nom. inval., pro syn.; Crowea saligna var. major Anon.; Crowea saligna Andrews var. saligna; Crowea saligna var. stricta Anon.; Eriostemon crowei F.Muell. nom. illeg., nom. superfl. p.p.; Eriostemon salignum Baill. orth. var.; Eriostemon salignus (Andrews) Baill.

= Crowea saligna =

Species of flowering plant

Crowea saligna, commonly known as willow-leaved crowea, is a plant in the rue family, Rutaceae, and is endemic to eastern New South Wales in Australia. It is a small shrub with pink, star-shaped flowers and is commonly cultivated.

== Description ==
Crowea saligna is a small shrub usually growing to a height of about 1–1.5 metres (3–5 ft) with conspicuously angled branches. The leaves are 30–60 millimetres (1–2 in), 3–13 millimetres (0.1–0.5 in) wide and are narrow elliptic to lance-shaped. They are also dark green, shiny, dotted with oil glands and there is a distinct mid-vein.

The flowers develop in the axils of leaves on a stalk 5-13 millimetres (<1/2 inch) long. There are 5 short, broad sepals and 5 overlapping petals forming a "star" shape. The petals are pink, sometimes white and are 12-18 millimetres (1/2-1 inch) long. The stamens are hairy and enclose the centre of the flower. The flowers appear from January to June and the fruits that follow are dry and have 5 compartments which open to release 2 seeds each.

== Taxonomy and naming ==
Crowea saligna was first formally described in 1800 by Henry Cranke Andrews. The description was published in The Botanist's Repository for New, and Rare Plants. The specific epithet (saligna) is a Latin word meaning "of willow".

== Distribution and habitat ==
Willow-leaved crowea occurs in Sydney between Woy Woy and Yerrinbool and on the adjacent Blue Mountains. It grows in sheltered locations on sandstone.

== Use in horticulture ==
Crowea saligna is widely cultivated due to its attractive flowers that appear when most other species are dormant. It prefers a well-drained position in sun or semi shade. It grows best in moist soils but will tolerate extended dry periods once established.
