= Pseudodillapiole =

Names
- IUPAC name 4,5-Dimethoxy-7-prop-2-enyl-1,3-benzodioxole
- Other names 4,5-Dimethoxy-2,3-methylenedioxy-1-allylbenzene

Identifiers
CAS Number	23724-27-8
3D model (JSmol)	Interactive image
PubChem CID	12558252
- InChI: InChI=1S/C12H14O4/c1-4-5-8-6-9(13-2)11(14-3)12-10(8)15-7-16-12/h4,6H,1,5,7H2,2-3H3 Key: SBWMDDUILBUFJS-UHFFFAOYSA-N
- SMILES: COC1=C(C2=C(C(=C1)CC=C)OCO2)OC

Properties
Chemical formula	C_{12}H_{14}O_{4}
Molar mass	222.240 g·mol^{−1}
- Except where otherwise noted, data are given for materials in their standard state (at 25 °C [77 °F], 100 kPa). Infobox references

Pseudodillapiole (4,5-dimethoxy-2,3-methylenedioxy-1-allylbenzene) is a derivative compound of allylbenzene that acts synergistically with at least some insecticides, such as piperonyl butoxide, enhancing their insecticidal effect. Pseudodillapiole can be used to synthesize a certain amphetamine derivative, 4,5-dimethoxy-2,3-methylenedioxy-1-amphetamine, also known as DMMDA-4, which is a positional isomer of DMMDA and DMMDA-2. Alexander Shulgin noted this in his book PiHKAL.

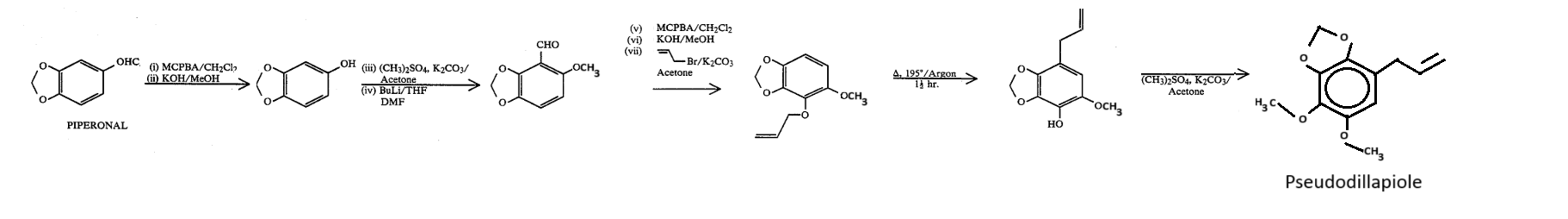
