= Apiol =

Oleoresin extracted from parsley

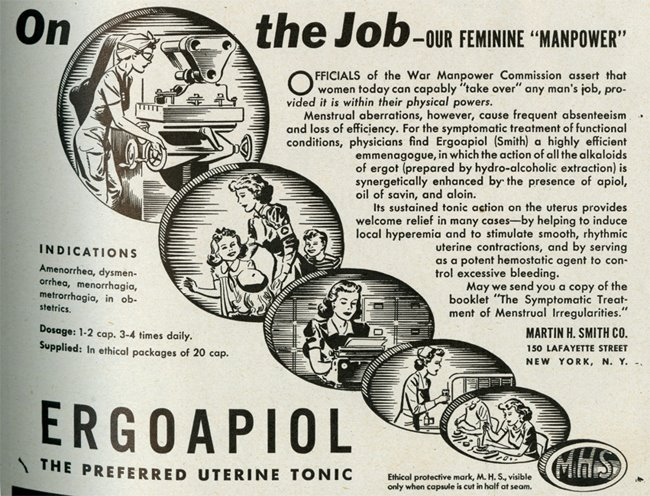
1944 advertisement for Ergoapiol

Apiol, also known as liquid apiol or green oil of parsley, is the extracted oleoresin of parsley, rather than the distilled oil. Due to its similarity to the term apiole, care should be taken to avoid confusion. Apiol is an irritant and, in high doses, it can cause liver and kidney damage. Cases of death due to attempted abortion using apiol have been reported.

Hippocrates wrote about parsley as a herb to cause an abortion. Plants containing apiole were used by women in the Middle Ages to terminate pregnancies.

Its use was widespread in the US, often as ergoapiol or apergol, until a highly toxic adulterated product containing apiol and tri-ortho-cresyl phosphate (also famous as the adulterant added to Jamaica ginger) was introduced on the American market.
