= Apiole =

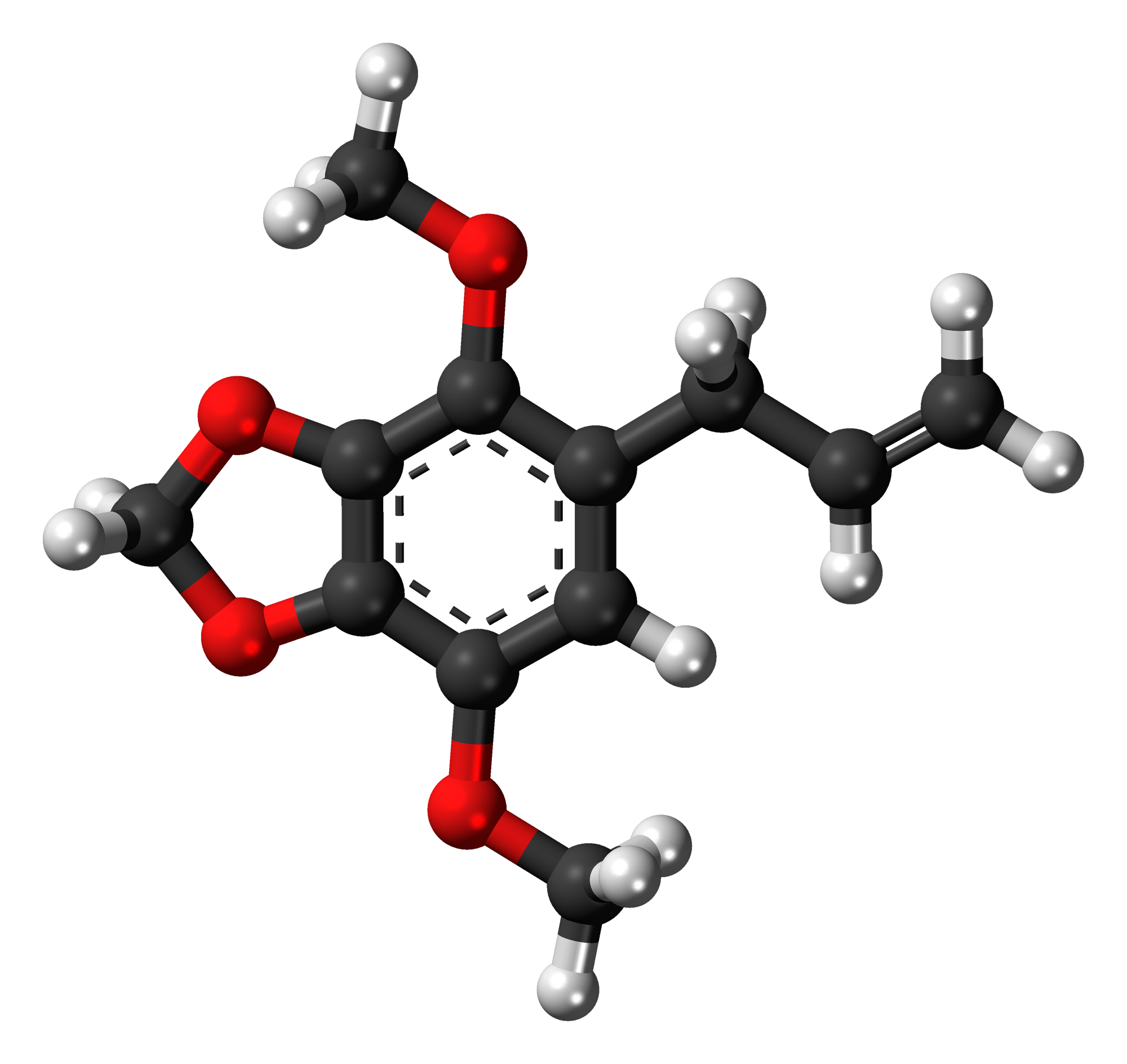

Names
- Preferred IUPAC name 4,7-Dimethoxy-5-(prop-2-en-1-yl)-2H-1,3-benzodioxole
- Other names 5-Allyl-4,7-dimethoxybenzo[d][1,3]dioxole; 1-Allyl-2,5-dimethoxy-3,4-methylenedioxybenzene

Identifiers
CAS Number	523-80-8
3D model (JSmol)	Interactive image
ChEBI	CHEBI:70353
ChEMBL	ChEMBL1560118
ChemSpider	21106259
ECHA InfoCard	100.007.592
EC Number	208-349-2
KEGG	C10429
PubChem CID	10659
UNII	QQ67504PXO
CompTox Dashboard (EPA)	DTXSID4041236
- InChI: InChI=1S/C12H14O4/c1-4-5-8-6-9(13-2)11-12(10(8)14-3)16-7-15-11/h4,6H,1,5,7H2,2-3H3 Key: QQRSPHJOOXUALR-UHFFFAOYSA-N; InChI=1/C12H14O4/c1-4-5-8-6-9(13-2)11-12(10(8)14-3)16-7-15-11/h4,6H,1,5,7H2,2-3H3 Key: QQRSPHJOOXUALR-UHFFFAOYAO
- SMILES: COc1cc(CC=C)c(OC)c2OCOc12

Properties
Chemical formula	C_{12}H_{14}O_{4}
Molar mass	222.23 g/mol
Density	1.151 g/mL
Melting point	30 °C (86 °F; 303 K)
Boiling point	294 °C (561 °F; 567 K)
- Except where otherwise noted, data are given for materials in their standard state (at 25 °C [77 °F], 100 kPa). verify (what is ?) Infobox references

Apiole is a phenylpropene, also known as apiol, parsley apiol, or parsley camphor. Its chemical name is 1-allyl-2,5-dimethoxy-3,4-methylenedioxybenzene. It is found in the essential oils of celery leaf and all parts of parsley. Heinrich Christoph Link, an apothecary in Leipzig, discovered the substance in 1715 as greenish crystals reduced by steam from oil of parsley.

In medicine it has been used, as essential oil or in purified form, for the treatment of menstrual disorders and as an abortifacient. It is an irritant and, in high doses, it can cause liver and kidney damage. Cases of death due to attempted abortion using apiole have been reported.

Hippocrates wrote about parsley as an herb to cause an abortion. Plants containing apiole were used by women in the Middle Ages to terminate pregnancies. Now that safer methods of abortion are available, apiol is almost forgotten.

== Orthography ==
Apiole (always with the final 'e') is the correct spelling of the trivial name for 1-allyl-2,5-dimethoxy-3,4-methylenedioxybenzene. Apiol, also known as liquid apiol or green oil of parsley, is the extracted oleoresin of parsley, rather than the distilled oil. Its use was widespread in the United States, often as ergoapiol or apergol, as an early form of birth control as well as for menstrual issues (and off label for abortions) until a highly toxic adulterated product containing apiol and tri-ortho-cresyl phosphate (also famous as the adulterant added to Jamaican ginger) was introduced on the American market. 1'-sulfoxy metabolite formation for apiole (3,4-OMe-safrole) is about 1/3 as active as safrole. No carcinogenicity was detected with parsley apiol or dill apiol in mice.

== Other similarly named compounds ==
The name apiole is also used for a closely related compound found in dill and in fennel roots, the positional isomer (dillapiole, 1-allyl-2,3-dimethoxy-4,5-methylenedioxybenzene. Exalatacin (1-allyl-2,6-dimethoxy-3,4-methylenedioxybenzene) is another positional isomer of apiole, found in the Australian plants Crowea exalata and Crowea angustifolia var. angustifolia.

== See also ==
- Dillapiole
- Myristicin
- PiHKAL § Essential amphetamines
