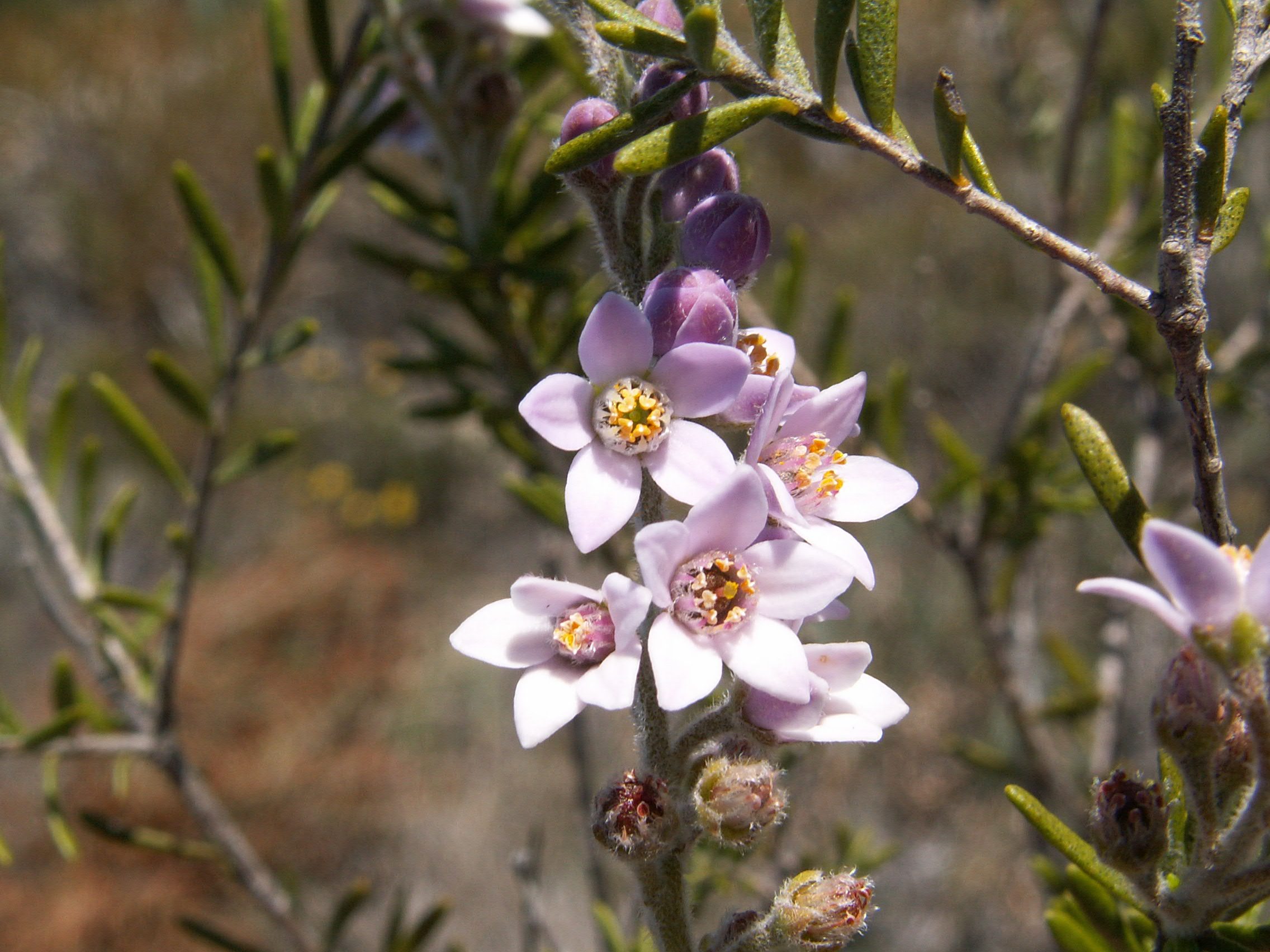
- Crowea angustifolia var. platyphylla

Scientific classification
- Kingdom: Plantae
- Clade: Tracheophytes
- Clade: Angiosperms
- Clade: Eudicots
- Clade: Rosids
- Order: Sapindales
- Family: Rutaceae
- Genus: Crowea
- Species: C. angustifolia

Binomial name
- Crowea angustifolia Sm.

= Crowea angustifolia =

Species of flowering plant

Crowea angustifolia is a flowering plant in the family Rutaceae, and is endemic to the south-west of Western Australia. It is an erect shrub growing to 3 m (10 ft) high by 1.0 m (3 ft) in diameter with white or pink flowers in spring.

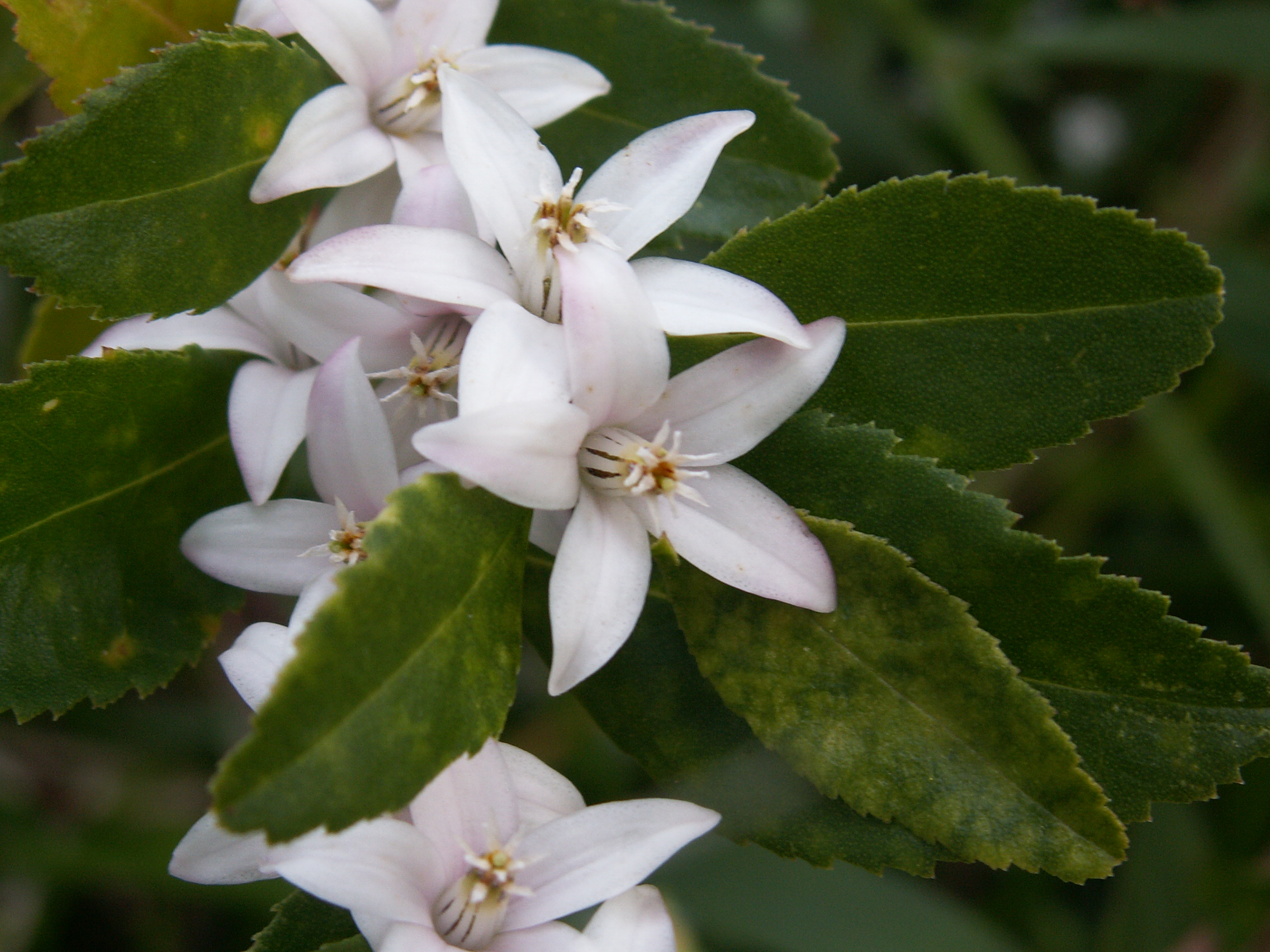
C. angustifolia var. platyphylla

== Description ==
Crowea angustifolia is a variable shrub growing to a height of 0.3–3.5 m (1–10 ft) high, either erect or spreading and diffuse. The leaves are thin, glabrous, linear to broad elliptic, or egg-shaped with the narrower end towards the base. They are 50–80 mm (2–3 in) long and less than 15 mm (0.6 in) wide. The flowers usually appear singly in the axils of the leaves on a pedicel 2–5 mm (0.08–0.2 in) long. There are between two and four bracteoles at the base of the flower and five separate sepals which are papery, more or less round and about 2 mm (0.08 in) long. There are five white or pink petals which are egg-shaped, thin and about 12 mm (0.5 in) long. The ten stamens and style are about 7 mm (0.3 in) long. Flowering occurs from September to December.

== Taxonomy ==
Crowea angustifolia was first formally described by James Edward Smith in 1808 from a specimen collected by "Mr Menzies near King George's Sound". The specific epithet (angustifolia) is derived from the Latin words, angustus meaning "narrow" and folium meaning "leaf".

Two varieties are recognised by the Australian Plant Census:

- C. angustifolia Sm. var. angustifolia Benth.(1863) that has more or less linear leaves and usually pink flowers;
- C. angustifolia var. platyphylla Benth. which has broader, more egg-shaped leaves and usually white flowers.

In his original paper describing the two varieties, Paul Wilson named them var. angustifolia and var. dentata, but later corrected the name of the second variety to var. platyphylla.

== Distribution and habitat ==
The species is endemic to the extreme south western corner of Western Australia, in the Jarrah Forest, Swan Coastal Plain and Warren biogeographic regions growing on sandy soils, gravel, granite, ridge tops, slopes and outcrops.
