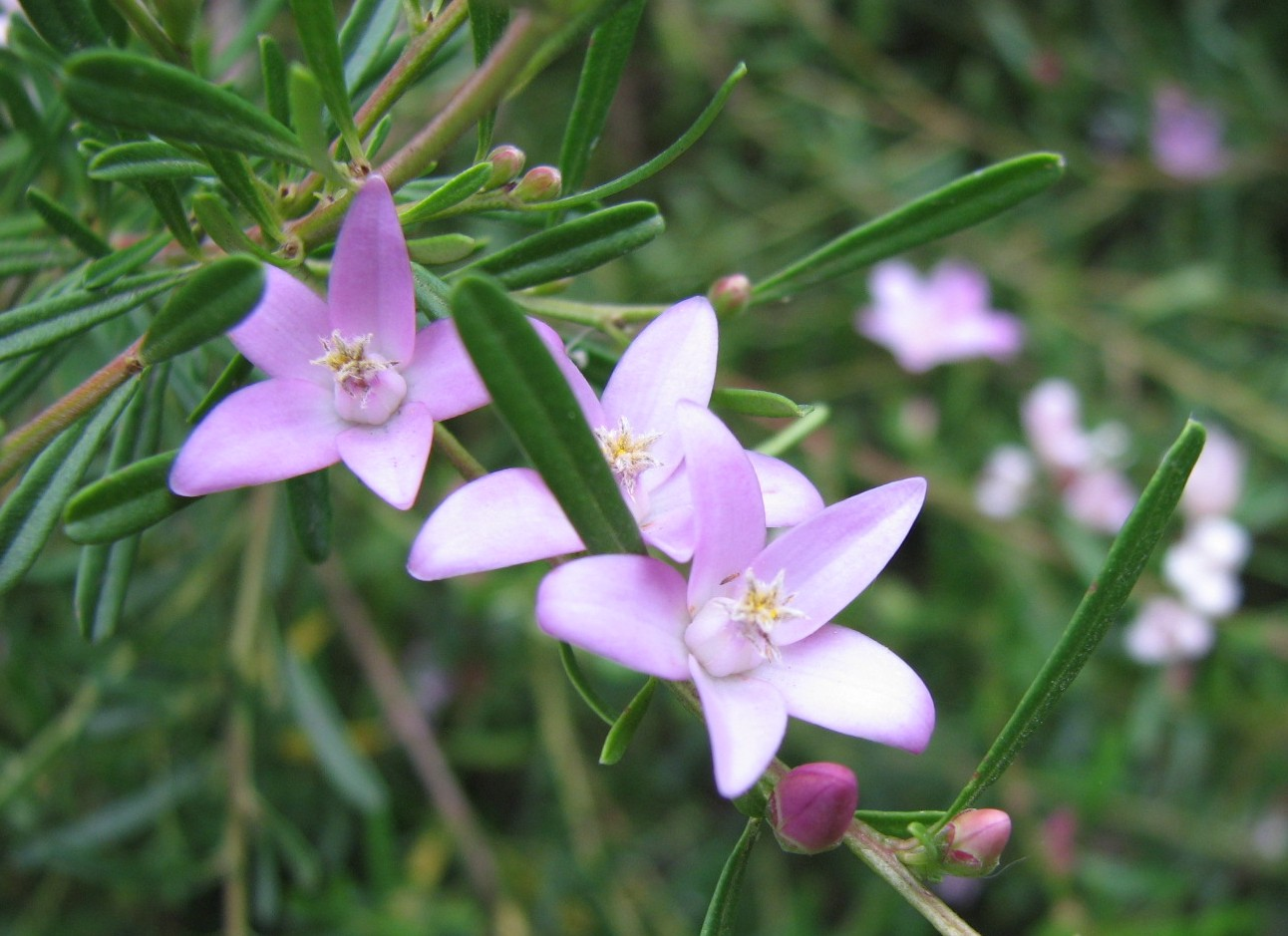
- In Maranoa Gardens

Scientific classification
- Kingdom: Plantae
- Clade: Tracheophytes
- Clade: Angiosperms
- Clade: Eudicots
- Clade: Rosids
- Order: Sapindales
- Family: Rutaceae
- Genus: Crowea
- Species: C. exalata

Binomial name
- Crowea exalata F.Muell.

Synonyms
- Eriostemon crowei F.Muell. nom. illeg., nom. superfl. p.p.; Eriostemon crowei F.Muell. var. crowei; Eriostemon crowei var. exalata (F.Muell.) Maiden & Betche

= Crowea exalata =

Species of flowering plant

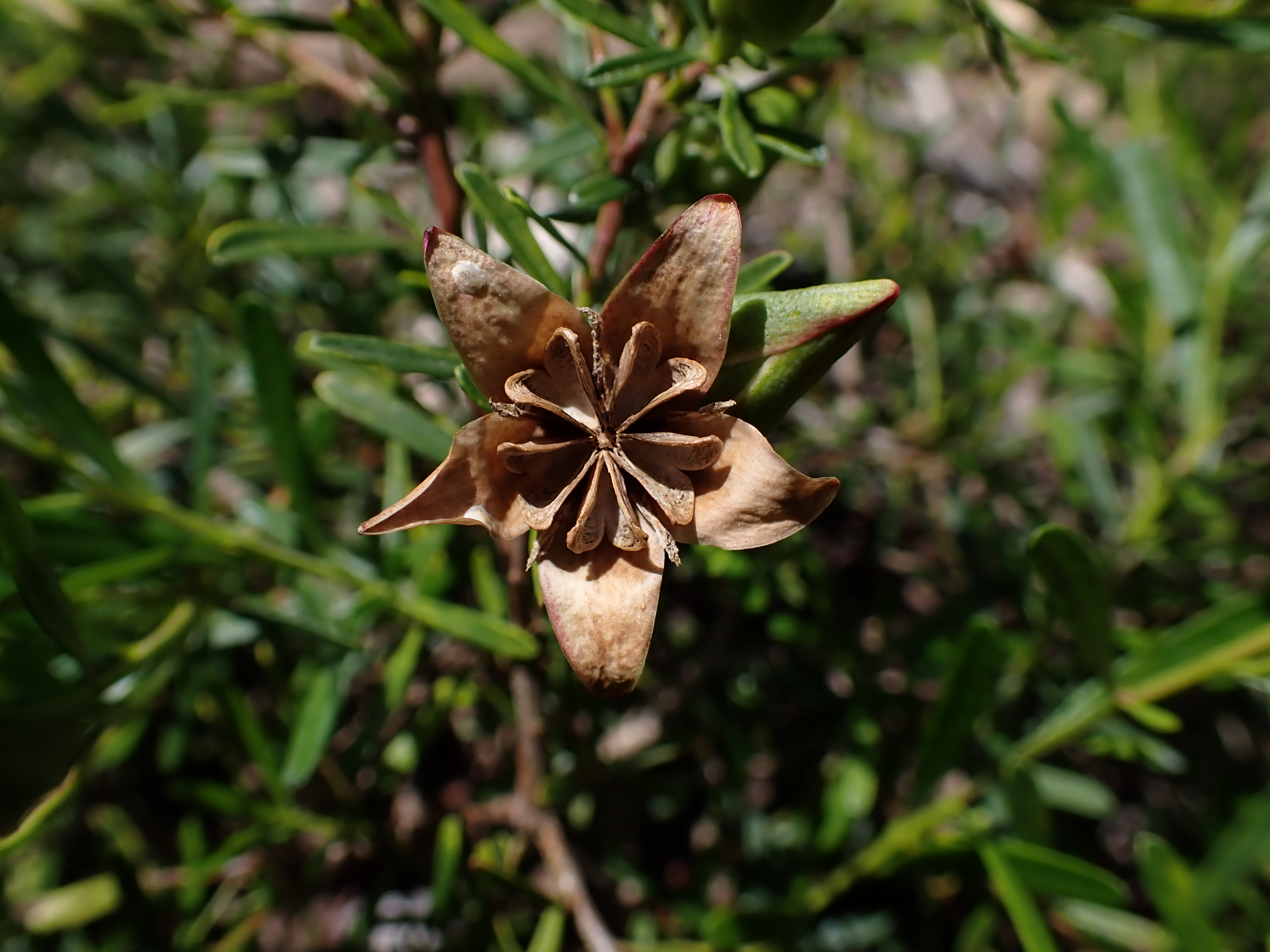
Fruit

Crowea exalata, commonly known as small crowea or waxflower, is a flowering plant in the family Rutaceae and is endemic to the states of Queensland, New South Wales and Victoria in Australia. It is an attractive small shrub and is a popular garden plant. It flowers mainly from late summer to mid-winter when few others are flowering but usually has some flowers at other times of the year.

== Description ==
Crowea exalata is a small shrub, growing to a height of about 1 metre (3 ft) with thin branches, often spreading to more than 1 metre (3 ft). Its leaves are narrow oblong to narrow egg-shaped with the narrower end towards the base and are 15–50 millimetres (0.6–2 in) long and 1–6 millimetres (0.04–0.2 in) wide. They have many oil glands and have a characteristic scent when crushed.

The star-like flowers appear on the ends of the branches or in the axils of the leaves on a stalk 2–4 millimetres (0.08–0.2 in) long. The five petals are egg-shaped, about 10 millimetres (0.4 in) and usually pink, sometimes white and a range of colours in the cultivars. The stamens in the centre of the flower almost overlap. Flowering occurs mainly from mid-summer to late winter but flowers can be present most of the year. The fruits that follow are dry and have 5 compartments which open to release 2 seeds each.

== Taxonomy and naming ==
Crowea exalata was first formally described by Ferdinand von Mueller in 1854. The description was published in Transactions of the Philosophical Society of Victoria. The specific epithet (exalata) is derived from the Latin ex- meaning "out of" and alata meaning "winged", hence "wingless".

Four subspecies are recognised by the Australian Plant Census as at November 2020:

- C. exalata F.Muell. subsp. exalata
- C. exalata subsp. magnifolia Gebert
- C. exalata subsp. obcordata Gebert
- C. exalata subsp. revoluta Paul G.Wilson

Cultivars include:

- 'Bindalong Compact'
- 'Ginninderra Falls'
- 'Green Cape'
- 'Pink Blush'
- 'Ryans Star'
- 'Southern Stars'
- 'Star of Heaven'
- 'Whipstick'
- 'White Star'

== Distribution and habitat ==
Small crowea occurs in New South Wales, Victoria and south east Queensland. It is found on the east coast, ranges and the slopes on the western side of the ranges. It grows in dry sclerophyll forest in sandy soil.

== Use in horticulture ==
Crowea exalata is widely cultivated and is usually available in Australian native plant nurseries. It grows best in light soil, partly shaded from the sun and is an ideal rockery plant. It is a hardy plant, especially when supplied with well-mulched soil and adequate water. Propagation is easier from cuttings because seeds must be nicked and held under running water for several weeks before sowing.

== See also ==
- Croweacin
