= Dillapiole =

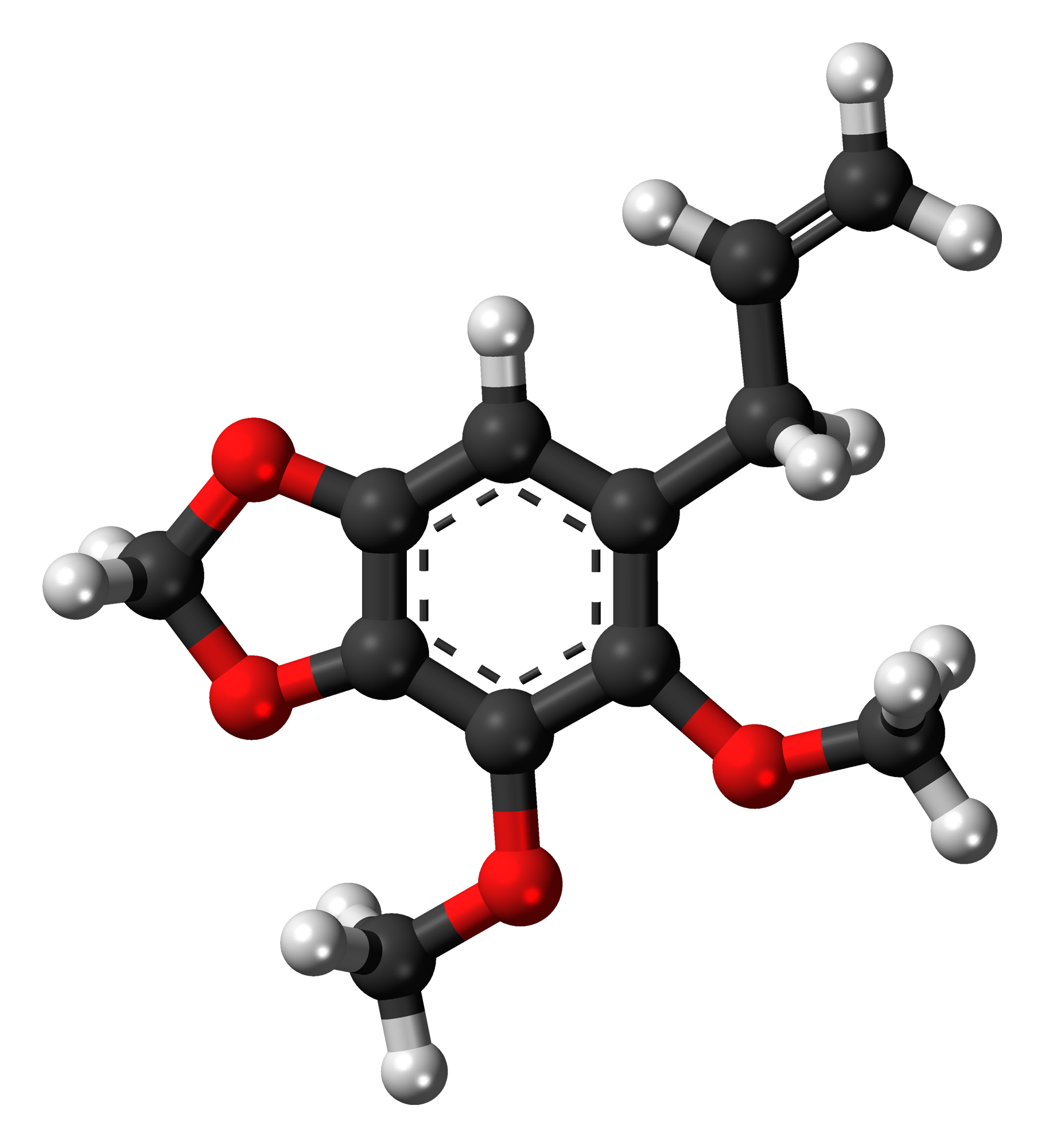

Names
- Preferred IUPAC name 4,5-Dimethoxy-6-(prop-2-en-1-yl)-2H-1,3-benzodioxole
- Other names 6-Allyl-4,5-dimethoxybenzo[d][1,3]dioxole; 1-Allyl-2,3-dimethoxy-4,5-(methylenedioxy)benzene

Identifiers
CAS Number	484-31-1
3D model (JSmol)	Interactive image
ChEMBL	ChEMBL470874
ChemSpider	9814
ECHA InfoCard	100.149.911
EC Number	621-020-1
KEGG	C10449
PubChem CID	10231
UNII	438CJQ562D
CompTox Dashboard (EPA)	DTXSID80862007
- InChI: InChI=1S/C12H14O4/c1-4-5-8-6-9-11(16-7-15-9)12(14-3)10(8)13-2/h4,6H,1,5,7H2,2-3H3 Key: LIKYNOPXHGPMIH-UHFFFAOYSA-N; InChI=1/C12H14O4/c1-4-5-8-6-9-11(16-7-15-9)12(14-3)10(8)13-2/h4,6H,1,5,7H2,2-3H3 Key: LIKYNOPXHGPMIH-UHFFFAOYAI
- SMILES: O1c2cc(c(OC)c(OC)c2OC1)CC=C

Properties
Chemical formula	C_{12}H_{14}O_{4}
Molar mass	222.240 g·mol^{−1}
Density	1.163 g/cm^{3}
- Except where otherwise noted, data are given for materials in their standard state (at 25 °C [77 °F], 100 kPa). verify (what is ?) Infobox references

Dillapiole is an organic chemical compound and essential oil commonly extracted from dill weed, though it can be found in a variety of other plants such as fennel root. This compound is closely related to apiole, having a methoxy group positioned differently on the benzene ring. Dillapiole works synergically with certain insecticides like pyrethrins similarly to piperonyl butoxide, which likely results from inhibition of the MFO enzyme of insects.

No carcinogenicity was detected with parsley apiol or dill apiol in mice.

== See also ==
- Pseudodillapiole
- PiHKAL § Essential amphetamines

== See also ==
- Apiole
- Phenylpropene
