= 2,3-Methylenedioxyamphetamines =

2,3-Methylenedioxyamphetamines may refer to:

- 2,3-Methylenedioxyamphetamine (2,3-MDA)
- 2,3-Methylenedioxymethamphetamine (2,3-MDMA)
- 4-Methoxy-2,3-methylenedioxyamphetamine (MMDA-3a)
- 6-Methoxy-2,3-methylenedioxyamphetamine (MMDA-5)

== See also ==
- 3,4-Methylenedioxyamphetamine
- Methoxymethylenedioxyamphetamine
- Substituted methylenedioxyphenethylamine
- Substituted methoxyphenethylamine
- Pentamethoxyamphetamine
