= C11H15NO3 =

The molecular formula C_{11}H_{15}NO_{3} may refer to:

- 3C-BOH
- Anhalamine
- FLEA (psychedelic)
- 4-Hydroxy-3-methoxymethcathinone
- Hydroxyphenamate
- Methylenedioxymethoxyamphetamine (MDMEO)
- 2-Hydroxy-4,5-methylenedioxymethamphetamine
- Methoxymethylenedioxyamphetamine
  - MMDA (drug)
  - MMDA-2
  - MMDA-3a
  - MMDA-3b
  - MMDA-5
- Propoxur
