= C12H17NO2 =

The molecular formula C_{12}H_{17}NO_{2} (molar mass : 207.26 g/mol, exact mass : 207.125929) may refer to:

- 2C-V
- 1,3-Benzodioxolylpentanamine
- Ciclopirox
- DOH-5-hemiFLY
- DOM-CR
- EDMA
- Fenobucarb
- F (psychedelic)
- Homo-MDMA
- 3,4-Isopropylidenedioxyamphetamine
- MAPEA
- MADAM-6
- Methylbenzodioxolylbutanamine
- Methylenedioxydimethylamphetamine
- 3,4-Methylenedioxy-N-ethylamphetamine
- Methylenedioxymethylphentermine
- N-Methylheliamine
- 4-Methyl-2,5-methoxyphenylcyclopropylamine
- Mexedrone
- Promecarb, used in insecticides
- Salsolidine
