= C13H19NO2 =

The molecular formula C_{13}H_{19}NO_{2} (molar mass : 221.30 g/mol) may refer to:

- 2C-AL
- 2C-CP
- Carnegine
- Dioscorine
- DOM-AT
- Ethylbenzodioxolylbutanamine
- F-2 (psychedelic)
- Ibuproxam
- Ifoxetine
- Methylbenzodioxolylpentanamine
- Methylenedioxyisopropylamphetamine
- Methylenedioxypropylamphetamine
- PF-219,061
