= C14H21NO2 =

The molecular formula C_{14}H_{21}NO_{2} (molar mass: 235.32 g/mol) may refer to:

- Amylocaine
- Berefrine
- 2C-G-4
- Carmantadine
- N,O-Didesmethyltramadol
- Ethylbenzodioxolylpentanamine
- F-22 (psychedelic)
- Meprylcaine
- Methylenedioxybutylamphetamine
- Padimate A
