= C12H17NO3 =

The molecular formula C_{12}H_{17}NO_{3} may refer to:

- Anhalidine
- Anhalinine
- Anhalonidine
- Bucetin
- Bufexamac
- Cerulenin
- Etamivan
- MEDA
- Methyl-MMDA-2
- EMDA-2
- MMDMA (drug)
- Methylenedioxyhydroxyethylamphetamine
- Rimiterol
- Tomscaline
- 3,4,5-Trimethoxytranylcypromine
- Hemi-flyscaline
