= C13H17NO3 =

The molecular formula C_{13}H_{17}NO (molar mass: 235.279 g/mol) may refer to:

- Dibutylone
- Eutylone
- Lophophorine
- 5-Methyl-ethylone
- Pentylone
- Propylone
- Mescaline-FLY
- Propynyl
