= Methylenedioxybenzylamphetamine =

MDBZ

Clinical data
- Other names: MDBZ; 3,4-Methylenedioxy-N-benzylamphetamine; N-Benzyl-MDA
- Routes of administration: Oral
- ATC code: None

Pharmacokinetic data
- Duration of action: Unknown

Identifiers
- IUPAC name: 1-(2H-1,3-benzodioxol-5-yl)-N-benzylpropan-2-amine
- CAS Number: 65033-29-6
- PubChem CID: 20507314
- ChemSpider: 15110233
- UNII: QR8242661A
- CompTox Dashboard (EPA): DTXSID10608233

Chemical and physical data
- Formula: C_{17}H_{19}NO_{2}
- Molar mass: 269.344 g·mol^{−1}
- 3D model (JSmol): Interactive image
- SMILES: C1=C3C(=CC=C1CC(C)NCC2=CC=CC=C2)OCO3
- InChI: InChI=1S/C17H19NO2/c1-13(18-11-14-5-3-2-4-6-14)9-15-7-8-16-17(10-15)20-12-19-16/h2-8,10,13,18H,9,11-12H2,1H3; Key:DWLUHTUYTBWOLO-UHFFFAOYSA-N

MDBZ, also known as 3,4-methylenedioxy-N-benzylamphetamine or as N-benzyl-MDA, is a chemical compound of the phenethylamine, amphetamine, MDxx, and N-benzylphenethylamine families related to MDA. It is the N-benzyl derivative of MDA.

== Use and effects ==
In his book PiHKAL (Phenethylamines I Have Known and Loved), Alexander Shulgin lists MDBZ's dose as greater than 150 mg orally and its duration as unknown. According to Shulgin, MDBZ showed "little if any activity".

== Chemistry ==
=== Synthesis ===
The chemical synthesis of MDBZ has been described.

=== Analogues ===
Analogues of MDBZ include MDA, MDMA, MDCPM, benzphetamine, benzylone (bk-MDBZ), and 2C2-NBOMe, among others.

== History ==
MDBZ was first described in the scientific literature by Alexander Shulgin and colleagues in 1980. Subsequently, it was described in greater detail by Shulgin in his book PiHKAL (Phenethylamines I Have Known and Loved) in 1991.

== Society and culture ==
=== Popular culture ===
In an episode of the British spoof documentary TV show Brass Eye, David Amess MP was fooled into recording a warning against a fictitious new drug called "cake". When asked a parliamentary question about it, the Home Office incorrectly assumed Amess was referring to MDBZ.

=== Legal status ===
==== United Kingdom ====
MDBZ is a Class A drug in the Drugs controlled by the UK Misuse of Drugs Act.

== See also ==
- Substituted methylenedioxyphenethylamine
- 25-NB (psychedelics)
