= C14H19NO3 =

The molecular formula C_{14}H_{19}NO_{3} (molar mass: 249.30 g/mol, exact mass: 249.1365 u) may refer to:

- Dipentylone
- Isohexylone
- N-Ethylpentylone, or ephylone
- PD-128,907
- Putylone
- Peyophorine
- Methylenedioxydeschlorobupropion
- MDPT
- N-Isopropylbutylone
