= C12H15NO4 =

The molecular formula C_{12}H_{15}NO_{4} (molar mass: 237.25 g/mol, exact mass: 237.1001 u) may refer to:

- O,O′-Diacetyldopamine
- Ethopabate
- 5-Methoxymethylone (2-A1MP)
- N-lactoyl-phenylalanine (Lac-Phe)
