= C16H17NO2 =

The molecular formula C_{16}H_{17}NO_{2} (molar mass: 255.312 g/mol, exact mass: 255.1259 u) may refer to:

- SKF-38,393
- UWA-001, or methylenedioxymephenidine
