= C12H14F3NO2 =

The molecular formula C_{12}H_{14}F_{3}NO_{2} (molar mass: 261.224 g/mol) may refer to:

- TFMBOX
- MDTFEA
