= Dimethylone =

Stimulant and empathogenic drug

Clinical data
- ATC code: None

Legal status
- Legal status: BR: Class F2 (Prohibited psychotropics); CA: Schedule I; DE: NpSG (Industrial and scientific use only); UK: Under Psychoactive Substances Act

Identifiers
- IUPAC name: 1-(1,3-benzodioxol-5-yl)-2-(dimethylamino)propan-1-one
- CAS Number: 765231-58-1 109367-07-9 (HCl)
- PubChem CID: 9794472
- ChemSpider: 7970239
- UNII: 4G26NSP297
- CompTox Dashboard (EPA): DTXSID801016917

Chemical and physical data
- Formula: C_{12}H_{15}NO_{3}
- Molar mass: 221.256 g·mol^{−1}
- 3D model (JSmol): Interactive image
- SMILES: CC(C(=O)C1=CC2=C(C=C1)OCO2)N(C)C
- InChI: InChI=1S/C12H15NO3/c1-8(13(2)3)12(14)9-4-5-10-11(6-9)16-7-15-10/h4-6,8H,7H2,1-3H3; Key:OSNIIMCBVLBNGS-UHFFFAOYSA-N

Dimethylone (βk-MDDMA) is a substituted cathinone derivative with stimulant and empathogenic effects. Unlike the corresponding amphetamine derivative MDDM which is thought to be practically inactive, dimethylone substitutes for methamphetamine and MDMA in animal studies and has been sold as a designer drug.

== Legal status ==
In the United States, dimethylone is considered a Schedule I controlled substance as a positional isomer of butylone.

== See also ==
- Substituted methylenedioxyphenethylamine
- Dimethylcathinone
- Dibutylone
- Dipentylone
- Methylone
- Ethylone
- Butylone
- Eutylone
- Ephylone
- 5-Methylethylone
- MDPPP
