= Lys-MDA =

Chemical compound

Clinical data
- Other names: N-(L-Lysinamidyl)-MDA; N-(L-Lysinamidyl)-3,4-methylenedioxyamphetamine
- Routes of administration: Oral
- Drug class: Serotonin–norepinephrine–dopamine releasing agent; Serotonin 5-HT_{2} receptor agonist; Entactogen; Empathogen; Serotonergic psychedelic; Hallucinogen; Stimulant
- ATC code: None

Pharmacokinetic data
- Metabolites: MDA

Identifiers
- IUPAC name: (2S)-2,6-diamino-N-[1-(1,3-benzodioxol-5-yl)propan-2-yl]hexanamide
- CAS Number: 1391487-26-5
- ChemSpider: 130299709

Chemical and physical data
- Formula: C_{16}H_{25}N_{3}O_{3}
- Molar mass: 307.394 g·mol^{−1}
- 3D model (JSmol): Interactive image
- SMILES: CC(Cc2ccc1OCOc1c2)NC(=O)C(N)CCCCN
- InChI: InChI=1S/C16H25N3O3/c1-11(19-16(20)13(18)4-2-3-7-17)8-12-5-6-14-15(9-12)22-10-21-14/h5-6,9,11,13H,2-4,7-8,10,17-18H2,1H3,(H,19,20)/t11?,13-/m0/s1; Key:ZUWUZALZPUJLCD-YUZLPWPTSA-N

Lys-MDA, or lysine-MDA, also known as N-(L-lysinamidyl)-MDA, is an entactogen of the phenethylamine, amphetamine, and MDxx families with entactogenic effects, which acts as a prodrug for MDA with a somewhat slower onset of effects and longer duration of action. Lys-MDA, along with the related derivative Lys-MDMA, are in early stage human clinical trials as potential treatments for treatment-resistant depression and post-traumatic stress disorder. New MDMA prodrugs are in the development phase at MiHKAL GmbH in Switzerland. A phase 1 clinical trial comparing MDMA, MDA, Lys-MDMA, and Lys-MDA has been completed as of August 2024. The trial results, which included pharmacodynamic and pharmacokinetic findings, was published in September 2025.

== See also ==
- Substituted methylenedioxyphenethylamine
- List of investigational hallucinogens and entactogens
- Lisdexamfetamine
- Serdexmethylphenidate
- N-t-BOC-MDMA
- Lomardexamfetamine
