= Methylenedioxymethoxyethylamphetamine =

MDMEOET

Clinical data
- Other names: 3,4-Methylenedioxy-N-methoxyethylamphetamine; MDMEOET; MDMEOETA; N-Methoxyethyl-MDA
- Routes of administration: Oral
- ATC code: None

Pharmacokinetic data
- Duration of action: Unknown

Identifiers
- IUPAC name: 1-(2H-1,3-benzodioxol-5-yl)-N-(2-methoxyethyl)propan-2-amine
- CAS Number: 74698-44-5
- PubChem CID: 44719584
- ChemSpider: 21106334
- UNII: YPA4B5U3U8
- CompTox Dashboard (EPA): DTXSID401348154 DTXSID10660371, DTXSID401348154

Chemical and physical data
- Formula: C_{13}H_{19}NO_{3}
- Molar mass: 237.299 g·mol^{−1}
- 3D model (JSmol): Interactive image
- SMILES: CC(Cc1ccc2c(c1)OCO2)NCCOC
- InChI: InChI=1S/C13H19NO3/c1-10(14-5-6-15-2)7-11-3-4-12-13(8-11)17-9-16-12/h3-4,8,10,14H,5-7,9H2,1-2H3; Key:LOZJEWOZOKSOKA-UHFFFAOYSA-N

MDMEOET, also known as 3,4-methylenedioxy-N-methoxyethylamphetamine or as N-methoxyethyl-MDA, is a psychoactive drug of the phenethylamine, amphetamine, and MDxx families. It is the N-methoxyethyl derivative of MDA.

== Use and effects ==
In his book PiHKAL (Phenethylamines I Have Known and Loved), Alexander Shulgin lists MDMEOET's dose as greater than 180 mg orally and its duration as unknown. It produced few or no effects at tested doses.

== Chemistry ==
=== Synthesis ===
The chemical synthesis of MDMEOET has been described.

== Society and culture ==
=== Legal status ===
==== United Kingdom ====
This substance is a Class A drug in the Drugs controlled by the UK Misuse of Drugs Act.

== See also ==
- Substituted methylenedioxyphenethylamine
