= 1,3-Benzodioxolylpentanamine =

BDP

Clinical data
- Other names: 1-(3,4-Methylenedioxyphenyl)-2-aminopentane; 3,4-Methylenedioxy-α-propylphenethylamine; MDPPEA; α-Propyl-1,3-benzodioxole-5-ethanamine; α-Propyl-3,4-methylenedioxyphenethylamine; α-Pr-MDPEA; 2-Amino-1-(3,4-methylenedioxyphenyl)pentane
- ATC code: None

Pharmacokinetic data
- Duration of action: Unknown

Identifiers
- IUPAC name: 1-(1,3-benzodioxol-5-yl)pentan-2-amine
- CAS Number: 220491-69
- PubChem CID: 22007048
- ChemSpider: 13616549

Chemical and physical data
- Formula: C_{12}H_{17}NO_{2}
- Molar mass: 207.273 g·mol^{−1}
- 3D model (JSmol): Interactive image
- SMILES: CCCC(CC1=CC2=C(C=C1)OCO2)N
- InChI: InChI=1S/C12H17NO2/c1-2-3-10(13)6-9-4-5-11-12(7-9)15-8-14-11/h4-5,7,10H,2-3,6,8,13H2,1H3; Key:BWUFCVGRQFOTOA-UHFFFAOYSA-N

1,3-Benzodioxolylpentanamine (BDP), also known as K or as 3,4-methylenedioxy-α-propylphenethylamine (MDPPEA), is a drug of the phenethylamine and amphetamine families. It is the parent compound of 1,3-benzodioxolyl-N-methylpentanamine (MBDP; methyl-K) and 1,3-benzodioxolyl-N-ethylpentanamine (EBDP; ethyl-K), as well as of pentylone (βk-MBDP). The drug was synthesized by Alexander Shulgin and mentioned in his 1991 book PiHKAL (Phenethylamines I Have Known and Loved). In contrast to MBDP and EBDP however, BDP did not have its own entry in PiHKAL and is not known to have ever been tried by humans. Very little is known about BDP.

== See also ==
- Substituted methylenedioxyphenethylamine
- Methylenedioxyphenylpropylaminopentane (MPAP)
