= MMDA-5 =

Clinical data
- Other names: 6-Methoxy-2,3-methylenedioxyamphetamine; 6-Methoxy-2,3-MDA; 6-Methoxy-ORTHO-MDA
- Routes of administration: Oral
- Drug class: Psychoactive drug
- ATC code: None

Identifiers
- IUPAC name: 1-(5-methoxy-1,3-benzodioxol-4-yl)propan-2-amine
- PubChem CID: 44374985
- ChemSpider: 23231801
- ChEMBL: ChEMBL161478

Chemical and physical data
- Formula: C_{11}H_{15}NO_{3}
- Molar mass: 209.245 g·mol^{−1}
- 3D model (JSmol): Interactive image
- SMILES: CC(CC1=C(C=CC2=C1OCO2)OC)N
- InChI: InChI=1S/C11H15NO3/c1-7(12)5-8-9(13-2)3-4-10-11(8)15-6-14-10/h3-4,7H,5-6,12H2,1-2H3; Key:CMLBFORYSUACKE-UHFFFAOYSA-N

MMDA-5, also known as 6-methoxy-2,3-methylenedioxyamphetamine or as 6-methoxy-ORTHO-MDA, is a psychoactive drug of the phenethylamine, amphetamine, and MDxx families related to ORTHO-MDA (2,3-MDA). It is the 6-methoxy derivative of ORTHO-MDA and is a positional isomer of MMDA-2 (6-MeO-3,4-MDA) and related compounds like MMDA (5-MeO-3,4-MDA) and MMDA-3a (2-MeO-3,4-MDA).

Alexander Shulgin briefly mentions MMDA-5 in his book PiHKAL (Phenethylamines I Have Known and Loved) and other publications. According to Shulgin, MMDA-5 has been very sparsely explored in humans. In any case, he described two experience reports with it that had been communicated to him. The first, at 30 mg orally, was said to be modestly active but not a particularly pleasant experience, whereas the other was at 15 mg orally but whether there were any effects was not mentioned. Shulgin did not test MMDA-5 himself, and the effects of MMDA-5, for instance whether it produces hallucinogenic or stimulant effects, have not otherwise been described. Based on the 30 mg report, Shulgin concluded that MMDA-5 might have approximately 10 or 12 times the potency of mescaline.

The chemical synthesis of MMDA-5 has been described. Other 2,3-MDA positional isomers of MMDA-5 include MMDA-3b and MMDA-4.

MMDA-5 was first described in the scientific literature by Shulgin and colleagues in 1969. Subsequently, it was described in greater detail by Shulgin in PiHKAL in 1991.

== See also ==
- Substituted methylenedioxyphenethylamine
- Methoxymethylenedioxyamphetamine (MMDA)
