= UWA-001 =

Chemical compound

Clinical data
- Other names: UWA001; α-Phenyl-MDMA; Methylenedioxymephenidine
- Drug class: Serotonin–norepinephrine reuptake inhibitor; Serotonin 5-HT_{2} receptor modulator

Identifiers
- IUPAC name: 2-(1,3-benzodioxol-5-yl)-N-methyl-1-phenylethanamine
- CAS Number: 1350821-28-1
- PubChem CID: 17757315
- ChemSpider: 34245583
- UNII: ZQ2R4KPZ2W
- ChEMBL: ChEMBL3303514
- CompTox Dashboard (EPA): DTXSID301045824

Chemical and physical data
- Formula: C_{16}H_{17}NO_{2}
- Molar mass: 255.317 g·mol^{−1}
- 3D model (JSmol): Interactive image
- SMILES: CNC(Cc1ccc2OCOc2c1)c3ccccc3
- InChI: InChI=1S/C16H17NO2/c1-17-14(13-5-3-2-4-6-13)9-12-7-8-15-16(10-12)19-11-18-15/h2-8,10,14,17H,9,11H2,1H3; Key:DNOTUUOUOFJQJC-UHFFFAOYSA-N

UWA-001 (also known as α-phenyl-MDMA and methylenedioxymephenidine) is a phenethylamine derivative invented at the University of Western Australia as non-toxic alternative to 3,4-methylenedioxy-N-methylamphetamine (MDMA) and researched as a potential treatment for Parkinson's disease.

It has a 5-HT_{2A} receptor affinity of 1.2 μM (~10-fold increase compared to MDMA), 1.3 μM for the serotonin transporter (~4-fold decrease compared to MDMA), 13.4 μM for the norepinephrine transporter (~26-fold increase compared to MDMA) and virtually no affinity for the dopamine transporter (>50 μM).

Unlike MDMA and para-methoxyamphetamine (but similarly to ketamine), UWA-001 increases prepulse inhibition and was therefore considered to be non-psychoactive, though it was not assayed at other binding sites. It is toxic to the SH-SY5Y cell line at high concentrations, however significantly less toxic than MDMA at all concentrations tested.

UWA-001 is structurally related to the diarylethylamines lefetamine (a stimulant and opioid) and the dissociative anesthetic ephenidine, which acts as a NMDA receptor antagonist.

== See also ==
- Substituted methylenedioxyphenethylamine
- AD-1211
- Diphenidine
- MBDP (UWA-091)
- Methoxphenidine
- MT-45
- UWA-101
- MDO-NPA
