= UWA-101 =

Chemical compound

Clinical data
- Other names: UWA101; α-Cyclopropyl-3,4-methylenedioxyphenethylamine; α-cP-MDPEA; α-cPr-MDPEA

Legal status
- Legal status: CA: Schedule I; UK: Class A

Identifiers
- IUPAC name: 2-(1,3-Benzodioxol-5-yl)-1-cyclopropyl-N-methylethanamine
- CAS Number: 1350821-24-7
- PubChem CID: 17756669
- ChemSpider: 27444374
- UNII: 0N2Q1RYR1X
- ChEMBL: ChEMBL3302434
- CompTox Dashboard (EPA): DTXSID701030287

Chemical and physical data
- Formula: C_{13}H_{17}NO_{2}
- Molar mass: 219.284 g·mol^{−1}
- 3D model (JSmol): Interactive image
- SMILES: C3CC3C(NC)Cc2cc1OCOc1cc2
- InChI: InChI=1S/C13H17NO2/c1-14-11(10-3-4-10)6-9-2-5-12-13(7-9)16-8-15-12/h2,5,7,10-11,14H,3-4,6,8H2,1H3; Key:DNROCNZQNQSVOG-UHFFFAOYSA-N

UWA-101, also known as α-cyclopropyl-3,4-methylenedioxyphenethylamine (α-cPr-MDPEA), is a phenethylamine derivative researched as a potential treatment for Parkinson's disease. Its chemical structure is very similar to that of the illegal drug MDMA, the only difference being the replacement of the α-methyl group with an α-cyclopropyl group. MDMA has been found in animal studies and reported in unauthorised human self-experiments to be effective in the short-term relief of side-effects of Parkinson's disease therapy, most notably levodopa-induced dyskinesia. However the illegal status of MDMA and concerns about its potential for recreational use, neurotoxicity and potentially dangerous side effects mean that it is unlikely to be investigated for medical use in this application, and so alternative analogues were investigated.

Replacing the α-methyl with a cyclopropyl dramatically reduces affinity for the noradrenaline transporter and 5-HT_{2A} receptor, while retaining high serotonin transporter affinity and markedly increasing affinity for the dopamine transporter (and as such, it is one of the few selective SDRIs or serotonin-dopamine reuptake inhibitors). This change causes UWA-101 to lack cytotoxicity and MDMA-like behavioral effects in animals, while retaining similar or slightly improved antidyskinetic effectiveness when compared to MDMA. This research was a continuation of earlier work from the same team led by medicinal chemist Matthew Piggott, at the University of Western Australia, which showed that replacing the α-methyl group of MDMA with larger aromatic ring systems produced compounds which lacked psychoactivity and neurotoxicity, but had potent anti-cancer effects against Burkitt's lymphoma cells in vitro.

UWA-121 is the (R)-enantiomer of UWA-101 and the (S)-enantiomer is UWA-122. Both are active monoamine reuptake inhibitors. UWA-121 is an SDRI with 10-fold preference for inhibition of dopamine reuptake over serotonin reuptake while UWA-122 is a highly selective serotonin reuptake inhibitor.

Another relative is UWA-104 ("α-isopropyl-MDMA"), which is also active. It is a selective dopamine reuptake inhibitor, with greater than 30-fold selectivity over the other monoamine transporters or the serotonin 5-HT_{2A} receptor. Other analogues include UWA-091 ("α-propyl-MDMA"), UWA-102 ("α-tert-butyl-MDMA"), and UWA-001 ("α-phenyl-MDMA"). The in vitro pharmacological activities of UWA-101, UWA-104, and UWA-001 have been reported.

== See also ==
- Substituted methylenedioxyphenethylamine
- MBDB
- Methyl-K (UWA-091)
- Isohexylone
- UWA-001
- Zylofuramine
- RTI-83 - another drug which selectively increases dopamine and serotonin levels without affecting noradrenaline
