= 3,4-Methylenedioxy-N-propargylamphetamine =

MDPL

Clinical data
- Other names: 3,4-Methylenedioxy-N-propargylamphetamine; MDPL; N-Propargyl-MDA
- Routes of administration: Oral
- ATC code: None

Pharmacokinetic data
- Duration of action: Unknown

Identifiers
- IUPAC name: N-[1-(2H-1,3-benzodioxol-5-yl)propan-2-yl]prop-2-yn-1-amine
- CAS Number: 74698-46-7
- PubChem CID: 44719587
- ChemSpider: 21106336
- UNII: TK2WH78T88
- CompTox Dashboard (EPA): DTXSID70660372

Chemical and physical data
- Formula: C_{13}H_{15}NO_{2}
- Molar mass: 217.268 g·mol^{−1}
- 3D model (JSmol): Interactive image
- SMILES: CC(NCC#C)Cc1ccc2OCOc2c1
- InChI: InChI=1S/C13H15NO2/c1-3-6-14-10(2)7-11-4-5-12-13(8-11)16-9-15-12/h1,4-5,8,10,14H,6-7,9H2,2H3; Key:LRYUTPIBTLEDJJ-UHFFFAOYSA-N

MDPL, also known as 3,4-methylenedioxy-N-propargylamphetamine or as N-propargyl-MDA, is a lesser-known drug and a substituted amphetamine.

== Use and effects ==
In his book PiHKAL (Phenethylamines I Have Known and Loved), Alexander Shulgin lists MDPL's minimum dose as 150 mg orally and its duration as unknown. MDPL causes few to no effects.

== Chemistry ==
=== Synthesis ===
The chemical synthesis of MDPL has been described.

== Society and culture ==
=== Legal status ===
==== United Kingdom ====
This substance is a Class A drug in the Drugs controlled by the UK Misuse of Drugs Act.

== See also ==
- Substituted methylenedioxyphenethylamine
