= Lys-MDMA =

MDMA prodrug

Clinical data
- Other names: Lysine-MDMA; N-(L-Lysinamidyl)-3,4-methylenedioxymethamphetamine; N-(L-Lysinamidyl)-MDMA; lysMDMA
- Drug class: Inactive
- ATC code: None

Identifiers
- IUPAC name: (2S)-2,6-diamino-N-[1-(1,3-benzodioxol-5-yl)propan-2-yl]-N-methylhexanamide
- CAS Number: 2763054-67-5
- PubChem CID: 166468301

Chemical and physical data
- Formula: C_{17}H_{27}N_{3}O_{3}
- Molar mass: 321.421 g·mol^{−1}
- 3D model (JSmol): Interactive image
- SMILES: CC(CC1=CC2=C(C=C1)OCO2)N(C)C(=O)[C@H](CCCCN)N
- InChI: InChI=1S/C17H27N3O3/c1-12(20(2)17(21)14(19)5-3-4-8-18)9-13-6-7-15-16(10-13)23-11-22-15/h6-7,10,12,14H,3-5,8-9,11,18-19H2,1-2H3/t12?,14-/m0/s1; Key:MJBFXZNNDCEDME-PYMCNQPYSA-N

Lys-MDMA, or lysine-MDMA, also known as N-(L-lysinamidyl)-MDMA, is an intended prodrug of MDMA which was being investigated for possible use as a pharmaceutical drug in the treatment of psychiatric disorders. Structurally, lys-MDMA is the amide formed through condensation of MDMA's amine group with the carboxylic acid of lysine; in this way, lys-MDMA is to MDMA as lisdexamfetamine is to dextroamphetamine. As of August 2024, a phase 1 clinical trial comparing MDMA, MDA, lys-MDMA, and lys-MDA has been conducted and completed. Lys-MDMA was being developed by MindMed.

The published phase 1 clinical trial unexpectedly found that lys-MDMA does not convert into MDMA in humans and is completely inactive. This is in contrast to lisdexamfetamine and lys-MDA, which are converted into dextroamphetamine and MDA, respectively. The lack of conversion was attributed to steric hindrance caused by the N-methyl group of lys-MDMA.

== See also ==
- Substituted methylenedioxyphenethylamine
- List of investigational hallucinogens and entactogens
- Lys-MDA
- Lisdexamfetamine
- Lomardexamfetamine
- DA-Phen
- Phenatine
- MiHKAL
