= Methylenedioxyallylamphetamine =

MDAL

Clinical data
- Other names: MDAL; 3,4-Methylenedioxy-N-allylamphetamine
- Routes of administration: Oral
- ATC code: None

Pharmacokinetic data
- Duration of action: Unknown

Identifiers
- IUPAC name: N-[1-(2H-1,3-benzodioxol-5-yl)propan-2-yl]prop-2-en-1-amine
- CAS Number: 74698-45-6
- PubChem CID: 44719581
- ChemSpider: 21106331
- UNII: HYC85U2R8Z
- CompTox Dashboard (EPA): DTXSID40660369

Chemical and physical data
- Formula: C_{13}H_{17}NO_{2}
- Molar mass: 219.284 g·mol^{−1}
- 3D model (JSmol): Interactive image
- SMILES: C1=C2C(=CC=C1CC(C)NCC=C)OCO2
- InChI: InChI=1S/C13H17NO2/c1-3-6-14-10(2)7-11-4-5-12-13(8-11)16-9-15-12/h3-5,8,10,14H,1,6-7,9H2,2H3; Key:BMKCDDFQEGYEJC-UHFFFAOYSA-N

Methylenedioxyallylamphetamine (MDAL or 3,4-methylenedioxy-N-allylamphetamine) is a lesser-known drug. It is the N-allyl derivative of 3,4-methylenedioxyamphetamine (MDA).

== Use and effects ==
In his book PiHKAL (Phenethylamines I Have Known and Loved), Alexander Shulgin lists MDAL's minimum dose as 180 mg orally and its duration as unknown. MDAL produces few to no effects on its own, but may enhance the effects of psychedelic drugs like LSD.

== Chemistry ==
=== Synthesis ===
The chemical synthesis of MDAL has been described.

== Society and culture ==
=== Legal status ===
==== United Kingdom ====
This substance is a Class A drug in the Drugs controlled by the UK Misuse of Drugs Act.

== See also ==
- Substituted methylenedioxyphenethylamine
- Phenylpropylaminopentane
- MDPR
