= 2,3-Methylenedioxyamphetamine =

Stimulant drug

2,3-MDA

Clinical data
- Other names: 2,3-MDA; Ortho-MDA; ORTHO-MDA
- Routes of administration: Oral
- Drug class: Stimulant
- ATC code: None

Legal status
- Legal status: Uncontrolled (but may be covered under the Federal Analogue Act in the United States and under similar bills in other countries)

Identifiers
- IUPAC name: 1-(1,3-benzodioxol-4-yl)propan-2-amine
- CAS Number: 23693-17-6
- PubChem CID: 152655
- ChemSpider: 134547
- UNII: 6409S541PA
- CompTox Dashboard (EPA): DTXSID00946494
- ECHA InfoCard: 100.215.976

Chemical and physical data
- Formula: C_{10}H_{13}NO_{2}
- Molar mass: 179.219 g·mol^{−1}
- 3D model (JSmol): Interactive image
- SMILES: CC(N)Cc2c1OCOc1ccc2
- InChI: InChI=1S/C10H13NO2/c1-7(11)5-8-3-2-4-9-10(8)13-6-12-9/h2-4,7H,5-6,11H2,1H3; Key:XOOVOZRNDZPGLF-UHFFFAOYSA-N

2,3-Methylenedioxyamphetamine, also known as 2,3-MDA or as ortho-MDA, is an amphetamine derivative which is mentioned in PiHKAL (Phenethylamines I Have Known and Loved) as a fairly potent and long-lasting stimulant drug, but with little or none of the entactogenic effects associated with its better-known structural isomer MDA.

== See also ==
- Substituted methylenedioxyphenethylamine
- 2,3-Methylenedioxymethamphetamine (2,3-MDMA)
- 1-Naphthylmethcathinone (AMAPN)
- Methoxymethylenedioxyamphetamine (MMDA)
- Dimethoxymethylenedioxyamphetamine (DMMDA)
- MMDA-3b and MMDA-5
