= Dipentylone =

Substituted cathinone stimulant drug

Legal status
- Legal status: DE: Anlage II (Authorized trade only, not prescriptible); UK: Class B; US: Schedule I

Identifiers
- IUPAC name: 1-(1,3-benzodioxol-5-yl)-2-(dimethylamino)pentan-1-one
- CAS Number: 803614-36-0 17763-13-2 (Hydrochloride)
- PubChem CID: 119057570
- ChemSpider: 52085278
- UNII: V41961I345
- CompTox Dashboard (EPA): DTXSID501342478

Chemical and physical data
- Formula: C_{14}H_{19}NO_{3}
- Molar mass: 249.310 g·mol^{−1}
- 3D model (JSmol): Interactive image
- SMILES: CCCC(C(=O)C1=CC2=C(C=C1)OCO2)N(C)C
- InChI: InChI=1S/C14H19NO3/c1-4-5-11(15(2)3)14(16)10-6-7-12-13(8-10)18-9-17-12/h6-8,11H,4-5,9H2,1-3H3; Key:PQTJKFUXRBKONZ-UHFFFAOYSA-N

Dipentylone (also known as dimethylpentylone or N,N-dimethylpentylone) is a substituted cathinone derivative with stimulant effects, which has been sold as a designer drug, first detected in Sweden in 2014.

== Pharmacology ==
Dipentylone is thought to be a prodrug of pentylone via N-dealkylation.

== Society and culture ==
Dipentylone was first identified in toxicology samples in the US in late 2021 and has been tracked by the Center for Forensic Science Research and Education (CFSRE) through its NPS Discovery program as an increasingly common drug mismarketed as MDMA where eutylone was previously commonly mismarketed as MDMA.

On June 26, 2023, the United States Customs and Border Protection seized 32.2 kilograms of dipentylone, sent from China labeled as "beauty products" mailed to an address in Washington, D.C.

On July 10, 2023, Jacksonville DEA Assistant Special Agent in Charge Mike Dubet gave an interview to WJXT (news4jax) reporting that dipentylone has been found in possession by people attending nightclubs and bars in the Jacksonville, Florida area.

=== Legal status ===
Dipentylone is not specifically listed in the United States Controlled Substance Act but would be considered Schedule I as a positional isomer of the Schedule I substance N-ethylpentylone in the United States, defined as "all isomers" within that definition.

== See also ==
- Substituted methylenedioxyphenethylamine
- Dibutylone
- Diethylpropion
- Dimethylone
- Ephylone
- Isohexylone
- MDPV
- N-Ethylhexedrone
- N-Ethylhexylone
- N-Isopropylbutylone
- Pentylone
