= MiHKAL =

Swiss pharmaceutical company

MiHKAL GmbH
- Industry: Pharmaceutical; Psychedelic medicine
- Founded: 2021; 5 years ago in Basel, Switzerland
- Founder: Matthias Grill
- Headquarters: Basel, Switzerland
- Website: www.mihkal.com

MiHKAL GmbH, with MiHKAL being an acronym of Molecules I Have Known and Loved, is a Swiss pharmaceutical company that is developing psychedelics and entactogens as potential medicines. Matthias Grill is the founder and chief executive officer (CEO) of the company, while Tamara Hell is its co-founder and chief financial officer (CFO). The name of the company is a play on the name of psychedelic chemist Alexander Shulgin's books PiHKAL (Phenethylamines I Have Known and Loved) and TiHKAL (Tryptamines I Have Known and Loved).

MiHKAL has filed and published patents on prodrugs of psychedelics and/or entactogens. In September 2021, Compass Pathways acquired MiHKAL's intellectual property (IP) and entered a non-exclusive partnership with the company to develop novel psychedelic compounds. MiHKAL's drugs include lys-MDA, lys-MDMA and psilocin prodrugs, among others. SDMA (3T-MDMA) and SDA (3T-MDA) have also been described by Matthias Grill and colleagues.

The company MiHKAL should not be confused with the late psychedelic music artist of the name MiHKAL (standing for Music I Have Known and Loved; real name Michael Anderson).

== See also ==
- List of psychedelic pharmaceutical companies
- List of investigational hallucinogens and entactogens
