= Methyl-MMDA-2 =

Chemical compound

Clinical data
- Other names: METHYL-MMDA-2; 2-Methoxy-4,5-methylenedioxy-N-methylamphetamine; 6-Methoxy-MDMA
- Routes of administration: Oral
- ATC code: None

Legal status
- Legal status: Uncontrolled (but may be covered under the Federal Analogue Act in the United States and under similar bills in other countries)

Pharmacokinetic data
- Duration of action: Unknown

Identifiers
- IUPAC name: N-methyl-1-(6-methoxy-1,3-benzodioxol-5-yl)propan-2-amine
- CAS Number: 108925-34-4
- PubChem CID: 44719597
- ChemSpider: 23553107
- UNII: MK3WE91ZB3
- CompTox Dashboard (EPA): DTXSID80903969

Chemical and physical data
- Formula: C_{12}H_{17}NO_{3}
- Molar mass: 223.272 g·mol^{−1}
- 3D model (JSmol): Interactive image
- SMILES: CC(CC1=CC2=C(C=C1OC)OCO2)NC
- InChI: InChI=1S/C12H17NO3/c1-8(13-2)4-9-5-11-12(16-7-15-11)6-10(9)14-3/h5-6,8,13H,4,7H2,1-3H3; Key:GBUNHVOIGFKQDT-UHFFFAOYSA-N

Methyl-MMDA-2, also known as 2-methoxy-4,5-methylenedioxy-N-methylamphetamine or as 6-methoxy-MDMA, is a psychoactive drug of the phenethylamine, amphetamine, and MDxx families. It is the N-methylated derivative of MMDA-2, and it is also an analogue of MDMA and 6-methyl-MDA.

== Use and effects ==
Methyl-MMDA-2 was first synthesized by Alexander Shulgin and was described in his book PiHKAL (Phenethylamines I Have Known and Loved). He states that it is essentially inactive at a dose of 70 mg orally, and he did not test higher doses; however, Methyl-MMDA-2 is still likely to be active, perhaps in the 125 to 250 mg range. This reduction in hallucinogenic activity relative to MMDA-2 parallels that of MDA and MDMA, indicating that with phenethylamines, N-methylation substantially reduces 5-HT_{2A} receptor affinity.

== Chemistry ==
=== Synthesis ===
The chemical synthesis of methyl-MMDA-2 has been described.

== See also ==
- Substituted methylenedioxyphenethylamine
- MMDA-2
- MDMA
- 6-Methyl-MDA
