= 3,4-Methylenedioxy-N-methylphentermine =

MDMP

Clinical data
- Other names: 3,4-Methylenedioxy-N-methylphentermine; MDMP; MDMPH; 3,4-Methylenedioxy-α,α,N-trimethylphenethylamine; α-Methyl-MDMA
- Routes of administration: Oral
- ATC code: None

Pharmacokinetic data
- Duration of action: "Perhaps 6 hours"

Identifiers
- IUPAC name: 1-(2H-1,3-benzodioxol-5-yl)-N,2-dimethylpropan-2-amine
- CAS Number: 81262-69-3
- PubChem CID: 44366836
- ChemSpider: 21106335
- UNII: P556669V7S
- ChEMBL: ChEMBL347779
- CompTox Dashboard (EPA): DTXSID10658475

Chemical and physical data
- Formula: C_{12}H_{17}NO_{2}
- Molar mass: 207.273 g·mol^{−1}
- 3D model (JSmol): Interactive image
- SMILES: CC(C)(NC)Cc1ccc2OCOc2c1
- InChI: InChI=1S/C12H17NO2/c1-12(2,13-3)7-9-4-5-10-11(6-9)15-8-14-10/h4-6,13H,7-8H2,1-3H3; Key:CRFWCCGPRXKZSM-UHFFFAOYSA-N

MDMP, also known as 3,4-methylenedioxy-N-methylphentermine or as α-methyl-MDMA, is a lesser-known psychoactive drug of the phenethylamine, amphetamine, and MDx families.

== Use and effects ==
In his book PiHKAL (Phenethylamines I Have Known and Loved), Alexander Shulgin lists MDMP's minimum dose as 110 mg orally and its duration as "perhaps 6 hours". MDMP produces few to no effects, and is slightly similar to MDMA.

== Pharmacology ==
=== Pharmacodynamics ===
MDMP failed to act as a serotonin releasing agent in rat brain synaptosomes in vitro.

== Chemistry ==
=== Synthesis ===
The chemical synthesis of MDMP has been described.

== Society and culture ==
=== Legal status ===
==== United Kingdom ====
This substance is a Class A drug in the Drugs controlled by the UK Misuse of Drugs Act.

== See also ==
- Substituted methylenedioxyphenethylamine
