= 1,3-Benzodioxolyl-N-ethylpentanamine =

EBDP

Clinical data
- Other names: N-Ethyl-1,3-benzodioxolylpentanamine; 1,3-Benzodioxolyl-N-ethylpentanamine; EBDP; 3,4-Methylenedioxy-α-propyl-N-ethylphenethylamine
- Routes of administration: Oral
- ATC code: None

Pharmacokinetic data
- Duration of action: Unknown

Identifiers
- IUPAC name: 1-(2H-1,3-benzodioxol-5-yl)-N-ethylpentan-2-amine
- CAS Number: 952016-47-6
- PubChem CID: 44719567
- ChemSpider: 21106304
- UNII: 198YKP5KCQ
- CompTox Dashboard (EPA): DTXSID00660365

Chemical and physical data
- Formula: C_{14}H_{21}NO_{2}
- Molar mass: 235.327 g·mol^{−1}
- 3D model (JSmol): Interactive image
- SMILES: C1=C2C(=CC=C1CC(CCC)NCC)OCO2
- InChI: InChI=1S/C14H21NO2/c1-3-5-12(15-4-2)8-11-6-7-13-14(9-11)17-10-16-13/h6-7,9,12,15H,3-5,8,10H2,1-2H3; Key:YIJZJPAWMJJXQD-UHFFFAOYSA-N

EBDP, also known as N-ethyl-1,3-benzodioxolylpentanamine, 3,4-methylenedioxy-N-ethyl-α-propylphenethylamine, or ethyl-K, is a psychoactive drug of the phenethylamine, amphetamine, and MDxx families. It is the N-ethyl analogue of BDP (K).

== Use and effects ==
In his book PiHKAL (Phenethylamines I Have Known and Loved), Alexander Shulgin lists EBDP's dose as greater than 40 mg orally and its duration as unknown. It produced a paresthetic twinge in the shoulder and no other effects at tested doses.

== Chemistry ==
=== Synthesis ===
The chemical synthesis of EBDP has been described.

== Society and culture ==
=== Legal status ===
==== United Kingdom ====
This substance is a Class A drug in the Drugs controlled by the UK Misuse of Drugs Act.

== See also ==
- Substituted methylenedioxyphenethylamine
- Methylbenzodioxolylpentanamine (MBDP; Methyl-K)
- Ethylbenzodioxolylbutanamine (EBDB; Ethyl-J)
- Ephylone (βk-Ethyl-K)
- Methylenedioxyphenylpropylaminopentane (MPAP)
