= 3,4-Methylenedioxy-N-methoxyamphetamine =

MDMEO

Clinical data
- Other names: 3,4-Methylenedioxy-N-methoxyamphetamine; MDMEO; MDMEOA; MDMeOA; N-Methoxy-MDA
- Routes of administration: Oral
- ATC code: None

Pharmacokinetic data
- Duration of action: Unknown

Identifiers
- IUPAC name: 1-(2H-1,3-benzodioxol-5-yl)-N-methoxypropan-2-amine
- CAS Number: 74698-48-9
- PubChem CID: 44719583
- ChemSpider: 21106333
- UNII: 2N67Z48J84
- CompTox Dashboard (EPA): DTXSID50660370

Chemical and physical data
- Formula: C_{11}H_{15}NO_{3}
- Molar mass: 209.245 g·mol^{−1}
- 3D model (JSmol): Interactive image
- SMILES: CC(NOC)Cc1ccc2OCOc2c1
- InChI: InChI=1S/C11H15NO3/c1-8(12-13-2)5-9-3-4-10-11(6-9)15-7-14-10/h3-4,6,8,12H,5,7H2,1-2H3; Key:MTIKJUJMCMDSGM-UHFFFAOYSA-N

MDMEO, also known as 3,4-methylenedioxy-N-methoxyamphetamine or as N-methoxy-MDA, is a psychoactive drug of the phenethylamine, amphetamine, and MDxx families. It is the N-methoxy derivative of MDA.

== Use and effects ==
In his book PiHKAL (Phenethylamines I Have Known and Loved, Alexander Shulgin lists MDMEO's dose as greater than 180 mg orally and its duration as unknown. It produced few or no effects at tested doses.

== Chemistry ==
=== Properties ===
MDMEO may be found as white crystals.

=== Synthesis ===
The chemical synthesis of MDMEO has been described.

== Society and culture ==
=== Legal status ===
==== United Kingdom ====
This substance is a Class A drug in the Drugs controlled by the UK Misuse of Drugs Act.

== See also ==
- Substituted methylenedioxyphenethylamine
