= EMDA-2 =

Clinical data
- Other names: 2-Ethoxy-4,5-methylenedioxyamphetamine; 6-Ethoxy-MDA; 6-EtO-MDA; 6-Ethoxy-MMDA-2; 6-EtO-MMDA-2
- Routes of administration: Oral
- Drug class: Serotonergic psychedelic; Hallucinogen
- ATC code: None

Identifiers
- IUPAC name: 1-(6-ethoxy-1,3-benzodioxol-5-yl)propan-2-amine
- PubChem CID: 61612198
- ChemSpider: 34243401
- ChEMBL: ChEMBL3246881

Chemical and physical data
- Formula: C_{12}H_{17}NO_{3}
- Molar mass: 223.272 g·mol^{−1}
- 3D model (JSmol): Interactive image
- SMILES: CCOC1=CC2=C(C=C1CC(C)N)OCO2
- InChI: InChI=1S/C12H17NO3/c1-3-14-10-6-12-11(15-7-16-12)5-9(10)4-8(2)13/h5-6,8H,3-4,7,13H2,1-2H3; Key:OHOFHHFTTSOJCK-UHFFFAOYSA-N

EMDA-2, also known as 2-ethoxy-4,5-methylenedioxyamphetamine, 6-ethoxy-MDA, or 6-ethoxy-MMDA-2, is a psychedelic drug of the phenethylamine and methylenedioxyamphetamine families. It is the analogue of MMDA-2 in which the 2-methoxy group has been replaced with a 2-ethoxy group. This has resulted in EMDA-2 being described as the "TWEETIO" analogue of MMDA-2.

== Use and effects ==
EMDA-2's dose is approximately 135 to 185 mg and its duration is about 10 to 12 hours. At 135 mg, it produced closed eye visuals, including intense colors, with sleep disturbances and a duration of some 10 hours. At 185 mg, its effects were stronger, including "marvelous" closed-eye visuals with "incredible" colors, good concentration, and distinct body tingles and rushes, with insomnia and a duration of about 12 hours. The potency of EMDA-2 is about one-third that of MMDA-2.

== History ==
EMDA-2 appears to have first been described in the scientific literature by at least 1975. Its effects in humans were described by Alexander Shulgin in his 1991 book PiHKAL (Phenethylamines I Have Known and Loved).

== Society and culture ==
=== Legal status ===
==== Canada ====
EMDA-2 may be a controlled substance in Canada under phenethylamine blanket-ban language.

== See also ==
- Substituted methylenedioxyphenethylamine
- Methoxymethylenedioxyamphetamine
