= Substituted methylenedioxyphenethylamine =

Class of psychoactive drugs

Chemical structure of MDPEA, the parent compound of this family.

The substituted methylenedioxyphenethylamines (abbreviated as MDxx) represent a diverse chemical class of compounds derived from phenethylamines. This category encompasses numerous psychoactive substances with entactogenic, psychedelic, and/or stimulant properties, in addition to entheogens. These compounds find application as research chemicals, designer drugs, and recreational drugs.

The base compound of the MDxx class is 3,4-methylenedioxyphenethylamine (MDPEA), and the prototypical agent of this class is 3,4-methylenedioxy-N-methylamphetamine (MDMA; "ecstasy"). Other notable MDxx class substances include 3,4-methylenedioxyamphetamine (MDA), 3,4-methylenedioxy-N-ethylamphetamine (MDEA; "Eve"), N-methyl-1,3-benzodioxolylbutanamine (MBDB; "Eden"), and 3,4-methylenedioxy-N-methylcathinone (βk-MDMA; "Methylone"). There are also cyclized phenethylamine MDxx compounds, such as MDAI, MDAT, MDPV, MDPM, and MDMAR.

== Use and effects ==
Oral doses and durations of methylenedioxyphenethylamines (MDxx)^{a}
Compound	Chemical name	Dose	Duration
MDPEA	3,4-Methylenedioxyphenethylamine	>300 mg	Unknown
Lophophine (MMDPEA; 2C-MMDA)	3-Methoxy-4,5-methylenedioxyphenethylamine	≥150–250 mg	Unknown
2C-MMDA-2 (2C-2; MMDPEA-2)	2-Methoxy-4,5-methylenedioxyphenethylamine	>2.6 mg	Unknown
2C-MMDA-3a (2C-3a; MMDPEA-3a)	2-Methoxy-3,4-methylenedioxyphenethylamine	≥40–120 mg	Unknown
2C-MMDA-3b (2C-3b; MMDPEA-3b)	4-Methoxy-2,3-methylenedioxyphenethylamine	Unknown	Unknown
2C-MMDA-4 (MMDPEA-4)	5-Methoxy-2,3-methylenedioxyphenethylamine	Unknown	Unknown
MDMPEA	3,4-Methylenedioxy-N-methylphenethylamine	>30 mg	Unknown
MDPEA-NBOMe	N-(2-Methoxybenzyl)-3,4-methylenedioxyphenethylamine	Unknown	Unknown
Lophophine-NBOMe	N-(2-Methoxybenzyl)-3-methoxy-4,5-methylenedioxyphenethylamine	Unknown	Unknown
2C2-NBOMe	N-(2-Methoxybenzyl)-2-methoxy-4,5-methylenedioxyphenethylamine	Unknown	Unknown
BOHH (β-hydroxy-MDPEA)	3,4-Methylenedioxy-β-hydroxyphenethylamine	>100 mg	Unknown
BOH (β-methoxy-MDPEA)	3,4-Methylenedioxy-β-methoxyphenethylamine	80–120 mg	6–8 hours
MDA	3,4-Methylenedioxyamphetamine	80–160 mg (20–200 mg+)	4–8 hours
(S)-MDA	(S)-3,4-Methylenedioxyamphetamine	160–225 mg	3 hours
(R)-MDA	(R)-3,4-Methylenedioxyamphetamine	70–200 mg	4–8 hours
ORTHO-MDA (2,3-MDA)	2,3-Methylenedioxyamphetamine	50 mg	"All night"
ORTHO-MDMA (2,3-MDMA)	2,3-Methylenedioxy-N-methylamphetamine	Unknown	Unknown
2-Methyl-MDA	2-Methyl-3,4-methylenedioxyamphetamine	≥40–100 mg	12–20 hours
5-Methyl-MDA	5-Methyl-3,4-methylenedioxyamphetamine	Unknown	Unknown
6-Methyl-MDA	6-Methyl-3,4-methylenedioxyamphetamine	160 mg	8 hours
MMDA (5-methoxy-MDA)	3-Methoxy-4,5-methylenedioxyamphetamine	100–250 mg	"Moderate"
MMDA-2 (6-methoxy-MDA)	2-Methoxy-4,5-methylenedioxyamphetamine	25–50 mg	8–12 hours
MMDA-3a (2-methoxy-MDA)	2-Methoxy-3,4-methylenedioxyamphetamine	20–80 mg	10–16 hours
MMDA-3b	4-Methoxy-2,3-methylenedioxyamphetamine	≥60–80 mg	Unknown
MMDA-4	5-Methoxy-2,3-methylenedioxyamphetamine	Unknown	Unknown
MMDA-5	6-Methoxy-2,3-methylenedioxyamphetamine	≥30 mg	Unknown
DMMDA (2,5-dimethoxy-MDA)	2,5-Dimethoxy-3,4-methylenedioxyamphetamine	30–75 mg	6–8 hours
DMMDA-2 (5,6-dimethoxy-MDA)	2,3-Dimethoxy-4,5-methylenedioxyamphetamine	~50 mg	Unknown
DMMDA-3	4,5-Dimethoxy-2,3-methylenedioxyamphetamine	Unknown	Unknown
DMMDA-4 (2,6-dimethoxy-MDA)	2,6-Dimethoxy-3,4-methylenedioxyamphetamine	Unknown	Unknown
DMMDA-5	4,6-Dimethoxy-2,3-methylenedioxyamphetamine	Unknown	Unknown
DMMDA-6	2,3-Dimethoxy-5,6-methylenedioxyamphetamine	Unknown	Unknown
EMDA-2 (6-ethoxy-MDA)	2-Ethoxy-4,5-methylenedioxyamphetamine	135–185 mg	10–12 hours
6-Chloro-MDA	2-Chloro-4,5-methylenedioxyamphetamine	160 mg	8 hours
6-Bromo-MDA	2-Bromo-4,5-methylenedioxyamphetamine	>350 mg	Unknown
2T-MMDA-3a	2-Methylthio-3,4-methylenedioxyamphetamine	>12 mg	Unknown
EIDA (EDA; 7-methyl-MDA)	3,4-Ethylidenedioxyamphetamine	>150 mg	Unknown
IDA (7,7-dimethyl-MDA)	3,4-Isopropylidenedioxyamphetamine	Unknown	Unknown
DFMDA (7,7-difluoro-MDA)	3,4-(Difluoromethylenedioxy)amphetamine	≥250 mg	Unknown
MDMA (Ecstasy; Molly; Adam)	3,4-Methylenedioxy-N-methylamphetamine	80–150 mg (25–200 mg+)	3–6 hours
(S)-MDMA	(S)-3,4-Methylenedioxy-N-methylamphetamine	60–125 mg	5 hours
(R)-MDMA	(R)-3,4-Methylenedioxy-N-methylamphetamine	250–300 mg	4–5 hours
MDEA (MDE; Eve)	3,4-Methylenedioxy-N-ethylamphetamine	100–200 mg (30–225 mg+)	3–5 hours
MDPR	3,4-Methylenedioxy-N-propylamphetamine	>200 mg	Unknown
MDIP	3,4-Methylenedioxy-N-isopropylamphetamine	>250–350 mg	Unknown
MDBU	3,4-Methylenedioxy-N-butylamphetamine	>40 mg	Unknown
MDCPM	3,4-Methylenedioxy-N-cyclopropylmethylamphetamine	>10 mg	Unknown
MDAL	3,4-Methylenedioxy-N-allylamphetamine	>180 mg	Unknown
MDPL	3,4-Methylenedioxy-N-propargylamphetamine	>150–200 mg	Unknown
MDBZ	3,4-Methylenedioxy-N-benzylamphetamine	>150 mg	Unknown
MDOH	3,4-Methylenedioxy-N-hydroxyamphetamine	100–160 mg	3–6 hours
MDMEO (MDME)	3,4-Methylenedioxy-N-methoxyamphetamine	>180 mg	Unknown
MDHOET	3,4-Methylenedioxy-N-(β-hydroxyethyl)amphetamine	>50 mg	Unknown
MDMEOET	3,4-Methylenedioxy-N-(β-methoxyethyl)amphetamine	>180 mg	Unknown
MDTFEA (MDTFE)	3,4-Methylenedioxy-N-(2,2,2-trifluoroethyl)amphetamine	>500 mg	Unknown
MDDM (MDDMA)	3,4-Methylenedioxy-N,N-dimethylamphetamine	>150 mg	Unknown
FLEA (MDMOH, MDHMA)	3,4-Methylenedioxy-N-hydroxy-N-methylamphetamine	100–160 mg	4–8 hours
Lys-MDA	N-(L-Lysinamidyl)-3,4-methylenedioxyamphetamine	~164 mg	~6 hours
Lys-MDMA	N-(L-Lysinamidyl)-3,4-methylenedioxy-N-methylamphetamine	Inactive^{b}	Inactive^{b}
N-t-BOC-MDMA	N-tert-Butoxycarbonyl-3,4-methylenedioxy-N-methylamphetamine	Unknown	Unknown
MADAM-6 (6-methyl-MDMA)	2-Methyl-4,5-methylenedioxy-N-methylamphetamine	>280 mg	Unknown
MMDMA (5-methoxy-MDMA)	3-Methoxy-4,5-methylenedioxy-N-methylamphetamine	Unknown	Unknown
Methyl-MMDA-2 (6-methoxy-MDMA)	2-Methoxy-4,5-methylenedioxy-N-methylamphetamine	>70 mg	Unknown
DFMDMA (7,7-difluoro-MDMA)	3,4-(Difluoromethylenedioxy)-N-methylamphetamine	>120 mg	Unknown
BDB (J)	3,4-Methylenedioxy-α-ethylphenethylamine	150–230 mg	4–8 hours
MBDB (methyl-J; Eden)	3,4-Methylenedioxy-N-methyl-α-ethylphenethylamine	180–210 mg (150–250 mg+)	4–6 hours
Ethyl-J (EBDB)	3,4-Methylenedioxy-N-ethyl-α-ethylphenethylamine	>90 mg	"Short"
BDP (K)	3,4-Methylenedioxy-α-propylphenethylamine	Unknown	Unknown
Methyl-K (MBDP)	3,4-Methylenedioxy-N-methyl-α-propylphenethylamine	>100 mg	Unknown
Ethyl-K (EBDP)	3,4-Methylenedioxy-N-ethyl-α-propylphenethylamine	>40 mg	Unknown
MPAP (propyl-K; PDBP)	3,4-methylenedioxy-N-propyl-α-propylphenethylamine	Unknown	Unknown
MDPH	3,4-Methylenedioxy-α,α-dimethylphenethylamine	160–240 mg	3–5 hours
MDMP (MDMPH)	3,4-Methylenedioxy-N-methyl-α,α-dimethylphenethylamine	>110 mg	~6 hours
3C-BOH (β-methoxy-MDA)	3,4-Methylenedioxy-β-methoxyamphetamine	40–70 mg	3–6 hours
MDC (βk-MDA)	3,4-Methylenedioxy-β-ketoamphetamine	Unknown	Unknown
Methylone (βk-MDMA)	3,4-Methylenedioxy-N-methyl-β-ketoamphetamine	100–250 mg (60–325 mg+)	2–5 hours
Ethylone (βk-MDEA)	3,4-Methylenedioxy-N-ethyl-β-ketoamphetamine	150–250 mg (80–400 mg)	2–6 hours
Dimethylone (βk-MDDMA)	3,4-Methylenedioxy-N,N-dimethyl-β-ketoamphetamine	Unknown	Unknown
Butylone (βk-MBDB)	3,4-Methylenedioxy-N-methyl-α-ethyl-β-ketophenethylamine	100–250 mg (20–250 mg)	2–5 hours
Eutylone (βk-EBDB)	3,4-Methylenedioxy-N-ethyl-α-ethyl-β-ketophenethylamine	Unknown	Unknown
Putylone (βk-PBDB)	3,4-Methylenedioxy-N-propyl-α-ethyl-β-ketophenethylamine	Unknown	Unknown
Dibutylone (βk-DMBDB)	3,4-Methylenedioxy-N,N-dimethyl-α-ethyl-β-ketophenethylamine	Unknown	Unknown
Pentylone (βk-MBDP)	3,4-Methylenedioxy-N-methyl-α-propyl-β-ketophenethylamine	30 mg (10–80 mg)	Unknown
Ephylone (βk-EBDP)	3,4-Methylenedioxy-N-ethyl-α-propyl-β-ketophenethylamine	Unknown	Unknown
Dipentylone (βk-DMBDP)	3,4-Methylenedioxy-N,N-dimethyl-α-propyl-β-ketophenethylamine	Unknown	Unknown
Isohexylone	3,4-Methylenedioxy-N-methyl-α-isobutyl-β-ketophenethylamine	Unknown	Unknown
N-Ethylhexylone	3,4-Methylenedioxy-N-ethyl-α-butyl-β-ketophenethylamine	Unknown	Unknown
N-Ethylheptylone	3,4-Methylenedioxy-N-ethyl-α-pentyl-β-ketophenethylamine	Unknown	Unknown
5-Methoxymethylone (βk-MMDMA)	3,4-Methylenedioxy-5-methoxy-N-methyl-β-ketoamphetamine	Unknown	Unknown
5-Methylethylone	3,4-Methylenedioxy-5-methyl-N-ethyl-β-ketoamphetamine	Unknown	Unknown
Benzylone	3,4-Methylenedioxy-N-benzyl-β-ketoamphetamine	Unknown	Unknown
MDPPP	3′,4′-Methylenedioxy-α-(pyrrolidin-1-yl)propanophenone	Unknown	Unknown
MDPBP	3′,4′-Methylenedioxy-α-(pyrrolidin-1-yl)butanophenone	Unknown	Unknown
MDPV (MD-α-PVP)	3′,4′-Methylenedioxy-α-(pyrrolidin-1-yl)valerophenone	5–10 mg (2–25 mg+)	3–5 hours
MDPHP (Monkey Dust)	3′,4′-Methylenedioxy-α-(pyrrolidin-1-yl)hexanophenone	Unknown	Unknown
MDPEP	3′,4′-Methylenedioxy-α-(pyrrolidin-1-yl)heptanophenone	Unknown	Unknown
MDPM	3-Methyl-3′,4′-methylenedioxy-2-phenylmorpholine	Unknown	Unknown
MDMAR	3′,4′-Methylenedioxy-4-methyl-5-phenyl-4,5-dihydro-1,3-oxazol-2-amine	Unknown	Unknown
MDAI (MDA-AI)	5,6-Methylenedioxy-2-aminoindane	100–200 mg (20–300 mg+)	2–5 hours
MDMAI (MDMA-AI)	5,6-Methylenedioxy-N-methyl-2-aminoindane	Unknown	Unknown
MDAT (MDA-AT)	6,7-Methylenedioxy-2-aminotetralin	Unknown	Unknown
MDMAT (MDMA-AT)	6,7-Methylenedioxy-N-methyl-2-aminotetralin	Unknown	Unknown
Footnotes: ^{a} = Methylenedioxyphenethylamines (MDxx compounds) variably act as psychedelics, entactogens, and/or stimulants. Examples of psychedelics include lophophine, MDA, MMDA, and MMDA-2; examples of entactogens include MDA, MDMA, MBDB, methylone, and MDAI; and examples of stimulants include ORTHO-MDA, MDPV, MDPM, and MDMAR. ^{b} = Lys-MDMA, unlike lys-MDA, is inactive, because it does not hydrolyze into and hence act as a prodrug of MDMA. Refs: Individual:

== List of substituted methylenedioxyphenethylamines ==
Structure	Chemical Name	Abbreviations	Other Names	CAS #	Ref
	3,4-Methylenedioxyphenethylamine	MDPEA	Homopiperonylamine	1484-85-1	
	3,4-Methylenedioxy-N-methylphenethylamine	MDMPEA	Homarylamine	451-77-4	
	β,N-Dimethyl-3,4-methylenedioxyphenethylamine	β,N-DM-MDPEA	MDDMPEA	83329-26-4	
	4,5-Methylendioxy-3-methoxy-phenethylamine	MMDPEA	Lophophine, Homomyristicylamine, 2C-MMDA, 5-Methoxy-MDPEA	23693-38-1	
	4,5-Methylenedioxy-3-methoxy-N-methylphenethylamine	MMDMPEA	N-Methyllophophine		
	2-Methoxy-4,5-methylenedioxyphenethylamine	2C-MMDA-2	MMDPEA-2; 6-Methoxy-MDPEA	497096-69-2	
	2-Methoxy-3,4-methylenedioxyphenethylamine	2C-MMDA-3a	MMDPEA-3a; 2-Methoxy-MDPEA	2220-19-1	
	3,4-Methylenedioxy-N-(2-methoxybenzyl)phenethylamine	NBOMe-MDPEA	MDPEA-NBOMe		
	3-Methoxy-4,5-methylenedioxy-N-(2-methoxybenzyl)phenethylamine	Lophophine-NBOMe	MMDPEA-NBOMe; 5-Methoxy-MDPEA-NBOMe		
	N-(2-Methoxybenzyl)-2-methoxy-4,5-methylenedioxyphenethylamine	2C2-NBOMe	2C-MMDA-2-NBOMe; NBOMe-MMDPEA-2; 6-Methoxy-MDPEA-NBOMe		
	3,4-Methylenedioxyamphetamine	MDA	"Sally, Sass, Sass-a-frass or Mellow Drug of America"	4764-17-4	
	2,3-Methylenedioxyamphetamine	2,3-MDA	ORTHO-MDA	23693-17-6	
	2,3-Methylenedioxymethamphetamine	2,3-MDMA	ORTHO-MDMA	168967-99-5	
	3,4-Methylenedioxy-N-methylamphetamine	MDMA, MDM	"Molly", "Ecstasy", "Adam", etc.	42542-10-9	
	3,4-Methylenedioxy-N-ethylamphetamine	MDEA, MDE	"Eve"	82801-81-8	
	3,4-Methylenedioxy-N-propylamphetamine	MDPR, MDPA		74698-36-5	
	3,4-Methylenedioxy-N-isopropylamphetamine	MDIP, MDIPR, MDIPA		74698-37-6	
	3,4-Methylenedioxy-N-butylamphetamine	MDBU, MDBA		74698-38-7	
	3,4-Methylenedioxy-N-isobutylamphetamine	MDIB, MDIBA			
	3,4-Methylenedioxy-N-allylamphetamine	MDAL, MDAA		74698-45-6	
	3,4-Methylenedioxy-N-benzylamphetamine	MDBZ, MDBZA		65033-29-6	
	3,4-Methylenedioxy-N-cyclopropylmethylamphetamine	MDCPM, MDCPMA, MDCA		22698-08-4	
	3,4-Methylenedioxy-N-hydroxyamphetamine	MDOH, MDHA, MDH		74698-47-8	
	3,4-Methylenedioxy-N-(2-hydroxyethyl)amphetamine	MDHOET, MDHEA		74698-43-4	
	3,4-Methylenedioxy-N-methoxyamphetamine	MDMEO, MDMEOA		74698-48-9	
	3,4-Methylenedioxy-N-(2-methoxyethyl)amphetamine	MDMEOET, MDMEA		74698-44-5	
	3,4-Methylenedioxy-N-propargylamphetamine	MDPL, MDPLA		74698-46-7	
	3,4-Methylenedioxy-N-(2,2,2-trifluoroethyl)amphetamine	MDTFEA, MDTFE		?	
	N-(L-Lysinamidyl)-3,4-methylenedioxyamphetamine	Lys-MDA		1391487-26-5	
	N-(L-Lysinamidyl)-3,4-methylenedioxy-N-methylamphetamine	Lys-MDMA		2763054-67-5	
	N-tert-Butoxycarbonyl-3,4-methylenedioxymethamphetamine	N-t-BOC-MDMA	NBoc-MDMA; NB-MDMA	1228259-70-8	
	3,4-Methylenedioxy-2-methylamphetamine	2-Methyl-MDA		691876-73-0	
	4,5-Methylenedioxy-3-methylamphetamine	5-Methyl-MDA		749191-14-8	
	4,5-Methylenedioxy-2-methylamphetamine	6-Methyl-MDA		246861-21-2	
	4,5-Methylenedioxy-3-methoxyamphetamine	MMDA	5-Methoxy-MDA	13674-05-0	
	4,5-Methylenedioxy-3-methoxy-N-methylamphetamine	MMDMA	N-Methyl-MMDA; 5-Methoxy-MDMA	172518-52-4	
	4,5-Methylenedioxy-3-methoxy-N-hydroxyamphetamine	NOM	N-Hydroxy-MMDA	?	
	2-Methoxy-4,5-methylenedioxyamphetamine	MMDA-2	6-Methoxy-MDA	23693-18-7	
	2-Ethoxy-4,5-methylenedioxyamphetamine	EDMA-2	6-Ethoxy-MDA; 6-Ethoxy-MMDA-2		
	2-Methoxy-4,5-methylenedioxy-N-hydroxyamphetamine	NOM-2	N-Hydroxy-MMDA-2	?	
	2-Methoxy-3,4-methylenedioxyamphetamine	MMDA-3a	2-Methoxy-MDA	23693-19-8	
	4-Methoxy-2,3-methylenedioxyamphetamine	MMDA-3b	2-Methoxy-ORTHO-MDA	23693-20-1	
	5-Methoxy-2,3-methylenedioxyamphetamine	MMDA-4	5-Methoxy-ORTHO-MDA	?	
	6-Methoxy-2,3-methylenedioxyamphetamine	MMDA-5	6-Methoxy-ORTHO-MDA	?	
	3,4-Methylenedioxy-N,N-dimethylamphetamine	MDDM, MDDMA		74698-50-3	
	3,4-Methylenedioxy-N,N,N-trimethylamphetamine	MDTMA			
	3,4-Methylenedioxy-N-methyl-N-hydroxyamphetamine	MDMOH, MDMHA, MDHMA	FLEA	214414-88-7	
	3,4-Methylenedioxy-N-ethyl-N-hydroxyamphetamine	MDEOH, MDEHA, MDHEA		866417-59-6	
	3,4-Methylenedioxy-2,5-dimethoxyamphetamine	DMMDA		15183-13-8	
	4,5-Methylenedioxy-2,3-dimethoxyamphetamine	DMMDA-2		15183-26-3	
	2-Chloro-4,5-methylenedioxyamphetamine	6-Chloro-MDA	2-Cl-4,5-MDA	46319-44-2	
	2-Chloro-4,5-methylenedioxy-N-methylamphetamine	6-Chloro-MDMA	2-Cl-4,5-MDMA	319920-71-3	
	2-Bromo-4,5-methylenedioxyamphetamine	6-Bromo-MDA	2-Br-4,5-MDA	151920-03-5	
	2-Bromo-4,5-methylenedioxy-N-methylamphetamine	6-Bromo-MDMA	2-Br-4,5-MDMA	2170110-34-4	
	2,N-Dimethyl-4,5-methylenedioxyamphetamine	MADAM-6	6-Methyl-MDMA; 2-Me-4,5-MDMA	207740-46-3	
	3,4-Methylenedioxyphentermine	MDPH		39235-63-7	
	3,4-Methylenedioxy-N-methylphentermine	MDMP		81262-69-3	
	3,4-Methylenedioxycathinone	βk-MDA, MDC		80535-73-5	
	3,4-Methylenedioxy-N-methylcathinone	βk-MDMA, MDMC	Methylone	186028-79-5	
	3,4-Methylenedioxy-N-ethylcathinone	βk-MDEA, MDEC	Ethylone	1112937-64-0	
	3,4-Methylenedioxy-5-methyl-N-ethylcathinone	5-Me-βk-MDEA	5-Methylethylone	1364933-82-3	
	3,4-Methylenedioxy-N-tert-butylcathinone	MDPT	Tertylone, tBuONE, MD-tBC	186028-84-2	
	1,3-Benzodioxolylbutanamine	BDB	J	42542-07-4	
	N-Methyl-1,3-benzodioxolylbutanamine	MBDB	Methyl-J; "Eden"	135795-90-3	
	N-Ethyl-1,3-benzodioxolylbutanamine	EBDB	Ethyl-J	167394-39-0	
	3,4-Methylenedioxy-β-hydroxyphenethylamine	BOHH	β-OH-MDPEA	7464-97-3	
	3,4-Methylenedioxy-β-methoxyphenethylamine	BOH	β-MeO-MDPEA	73304-06-0	
	3,4-Methylenedioxy-β-methoxyamphetamine	3C-BOH	β-MeO-MDA	?	
	β-Keto-N-methyl-1,3-benzodioxolylbutanamine	βk-MBDB	Butylone	802575-11-7	
	β-Keto-N-ethyl-1,3-benzodioxolylbutanamine	βk-EBDB	Eutylone	802855-66-9	
	β-Keto-N,N-dimethyl-1,3-benzodioxolylbutanamine	βk-DMBDB	Dibutylone	802286-83-5	
	1,3-Benzodioxolylpentanamine	BDP	K	220491-69	
	N-Methyl-1,3-benzodioxolylpentanamine	MBDP	Methyl-K	952016-78-3	
	N-Ethyl-1,3-benzodioxolylpentanamine	EBDP	Ethyl-K	952016-47-6	
	1-(3,4-Methylenedioxyphenyl)-2-propylaminopentane	MPAP	PBDP		
	2-(1,3-Benzodioxol-5-yl)-1-(propan-2-yl)-N-methylethanamine	α-iPr-MDMPEA	UWA-104		
	2-(1,3-Benzodioxol-5-yl)-1-cyclopropyl-N-methylethanamine	α-cPr-MDMPEA	UWA-101	1350821-24-7	
	2-(1,3-Benzodioxol-5-yl)-N-methyl-1-phenylethanamine	α-Ph-MDMPEA	UWA-001	1350821-28-1	
	β-Keto-N-methyl-1,3-benzodioxolylpentanamine	βk-MBDP, βk-Methyl-K	Pentylone	698963-77-8	
	β-Keto-N-ethyl-1,3-benzodioxolylpentanamine	βk-EBDP	Ephylone	727641-67-0	

== Related compounds ==
In addition, there are a number of other compounds that have some structural and pharmacological similarities to the methylenedioxyphenethylamines, and are useful for comparison. These can be broadly divided into (i) compounds where the methylenedioxyphenyl ring is retained but the phenethyl portion is modified, or (ii) compounds which retain the 3,4-cyclised amphetamine core common to the MDxx compounds, but have the 1,3-benzodioxole ring replaced by related heterocycles. In addition to the (i) and (ii) compounds, MDxx compounds are closely related to the other two main phenylethylamine classes, those being substituted amphetamines and substituted cathinones. Like amphetamines and cathinones, MDxx compounds derive most if not all of their stimulant effects from the phenylethylamine core, in fact most MDxx compounds can also be grouped with cathinones and or amphetamines due to having similar functional groups, but in most cases any compound with a methylenedioxy group attached will be grouped as an MDxx compound due to the unique hallucinogenic and empathogenic/entactogenic effects that are not present in most other amphetamines and present to a lesser extent in most cathinones.

Structure	Chemical Name	Abbreviations	Other Names	CAS #	Ref
	3,4-Dimethoxyamphetamine	3,4-DMA		120-26-3	
	3,4-Dimethoxymethamphetamine	3,4-DMMA		33236-61-2	
	3,4-Methylenedioxyphenyl-1-propene		Isosafrole	120-58-1	
	3,4-Methylenedioxyphenyl-2-propene		Safrole, Shikimol	94-59-7	
	4,5-Methylenedioxyphenyl-3-methoxy-2-propene		Myristicin	607-91-0	
	3,4-Methylenedioxyphenyl-1-propanone	MDP1P		28281-49-4	
	3,4-Methylenedioxyphenyl-2-propanone	MDP2P		4676-39-5	
	3,4-Methylenedioxybenzaldehyde		Piperonal	120-57-0	
	3,4-Methylenedioxyphenol		Sesamol	533-31-3	
	5-(3,4-Methylenedioxyphenyl)-2,4-pentadienoyl-2-piperidine		Piperine	94-62-2	
	(2Z,4Z)-5-(2H-1,3-Benzodioxol-5-yl)-1-(piperidin-1-yl)penta-2,4-dien-1-one		Chavicine	495-91-0	
	3,4-Methylenedioxycinnamylpiperidine		Ilepcimide	23434-86-8	
	3,4-methylenedioxy-α,N-dimethylbenzylamine	MDM1EA	α,N-DMMDBA	121734-65-4	
	3,4-methylenedioxy-α-ethylbenzylamine	ALPHA		127292-42-6	
	3,4-methylenedioxy-α-ethyl-N-methylbenzylamine	M-ALPHA		127292-43-7	
	4-(1,3-Benzodioxol-5-yl)butan-2-amine		Homo-MDA, HMDA	40742-32-3	
	4-(1,3-Benzodioxol-5-yl)-N-methylbutan-2-amine		Homo-MDMA, HMDMA	108248-08-4	
	trans-4-(4-Fluorophenyl)-3-[(3,4-methylenedioxy)phenoxy]methylpiperidine		Paroxetine	61869-08-7	
	5,6-Methylenedioxy-2-aminoindane	5,6-MDAI, MDAI		132741-81-2	
	5,6-Methylenedioxy-N-methyl-2-aminoindane	5,6-MDMAI, MDMAI		132741-82-3	
	6,7-Methylenedioxy-2-aminotetralin	6,7-MDAT		101625-35-8	
	6,7-Methylenedioxy-2-methylaminotetralin	6,7-MDMAT		34620-52-5	
	3,4-Methylenedioxy-1-benzylpiperazine	MDBZP	Piperonylpiperazine	32231-06-4	
	3,4-Methylenedioxy-α-pyrrolidinopropiophenone	MDPPP		783241-66-7	
	3',4'-Methylenedioxy-α-pyrrolidinobutiophenone	MDPBP		784985-33-7	
	3,4-Methylenedioxy-α-pyrrolidinopentiophenone	MDPV	"Monkey Dust"	687603-66-3	
	3,4-Methylenedioxy-α-pyrrolidinohexiophenone	MDPHP	Also known as "Monkey Dust"	776994-64-0	
	Methylenedioxyphenmetrazine	MDPM	3,4-Methylenedioxyphenmetrazine		
	Methyl (1,3-benzodioxol-5-yl)(piperidin-2-yl)acetate	MDMPH	3,4-Methylenedioxymethylphenidate		
	4-Methyl-5-(1,3-benzodioxol-5-yl)-4,5-dihydro-1,3-oxazol-2-amine	MDMAR	3',4'-Methylenedioxy-4-methylaminorex	1445573-16-9	
	1-(4-Aminophenyl)-4-methyl-7,8-methylenedioxy-2,3-benzodiazepine	GYKI-52895		869360-93-0	
	3,4-Ethylidenedioxyamphetamine	EIDA		125299-84-5	
	3,4-Isopropylidenedioxyamphetamine	IDA			
	1-(2,2-Difluoro-1,3-benzodioxol-5-yl)propan-2-amine	DFMDA		910393-51-0	
	1-(2,2-Difluoro-2H-1,3-benzodioxol-5-yl)-N-methylpropan-2-amine	DFMDMA		?	
	3,4-Ethylenedioxyamphetamine	EDA	EDA-6	15033-67-7	
	3,4-Ethylenedioxy-N-methylamphetamine	EDMA		133787-66-3	
	3-Methoxy-4,5-ethylenedioxyamphetamine	MEDA	5-Methoxy-EDA	23693-25-6	
	3-Methoxy-4,5-trimethylenedioxyamphetamine	MTDA	5-Methoxy-TDA		
	1-(2,3-Dihydro-1-benzofuran-5-yl)propan-2-amine	5-APDB		152624-03-8	
	1-(1,3-Dihydro-2-benzofuran-5-yl)-N-methylpropan-2-amine	IBF5MAP		201407-56-9	
	1-(2,3-Dihydro-1-benzofuran-6-yl)propan-2-amine	6-APDB		152623-93-3	
	1-(1-Benzofuran-5-yl)propan-2-amine	5-APB		286834-81-9	
	N-Methyl-1-(1-benzofuran-5-yl)propan-2-amine	5-MAPB		1354631-77-8	
	N-Ethyl-1-(1-benzofuran-5-yl)propan-2-amine	5-EAPB		1445566-01-7	
	N-Methyl-1-(1-benzofuran-5-yl)butan-2-amine	5-MBPB	5-MABB		
	1-(1-Benzofuran-6-yl)propan-2-amine	6-APB		286834-85-3	
	N-Methyl-1-(1-benzofuran-6-yl)propan-2-amine	6-MAPB		1354631-79-0	
	6-(2-Methylaminobutyl)benzofuran	6-MBPB	6-MABB		
	1-(2,3-Dihydro-1H-inden-5-yl)propan-2-amine	5-APDI	IAP	13396-94-6	
	1-(2,3-Dihydro-1H-inden-5-yl)-N-methylpropan-2-amine	5-MAPDI	IMP	1310153-27-5	
	1-(5,6,7,8-Tetrahydronaphthalen-2-yl)propan-2-amine	6-APT	TAP	3160-20-1	
	2-(Pyrrolidin-1-yl)-1-(5,6,7,8-tetrahydronaphthalen-2-yl)pentan-1-one	TH-PVP		2304915-07-7	
	1-(Naphthalen-2-yl)propan-2-amine	NAP	PAL-287	18085-03-5	
	N-Methyl-1-(naphthalen-2-yl)propan-2-amine	MNAP	Methamnetamine; PAL-1046	1178720-66-5	
	N-Ethyl-1-naphthalen-2-ylpropan-2-amine	ENAP	PAL-1045		
	2-(Methylamino)-1-(naphthalene-2-yl) propan-1-one	BMAPN	βk-Methamnetamine; 2-Naphthylmethcathinone	109453-73-8	
	1-(1-Benzothiophen-5-yl)propan-2-amine	5-APBT		1368128-53-3	
	1-(Benzo[b]thiophen-5-yl)-N-methylpropan-2-amine	5-MAPBT	MY400	2613382-32-2	
	1-(1-Benzothiophen-6-yl)propan-2-amine	6-APBT			
	1-(Benzo[b]thiophen-6-yl)-N-methylpropan-2-amine	6-MAPBT	MY300		
	1-(1-Benzothiophen-5-yl)-2-(methylamino)propan-1-one	BK-5-MAPBT		2106849-09-4	
	1-(1H-Indol-5-yl)propan-2-amine	5-API	5-IT	3784-30-3	
	1-(1H-1,3-Benzodiazol-5-yl)propan-2-amine			752145-76-9	
	1-(1,3-Benzodiazol-5-yl)-N-methylpropan-2-amine				
	1-(1,3-Benzoxazol-5-yl)propan-2-amine			1368557-51-0	
	1-(1,3-Benzothiazol-5-yl)propan-2-amine	5-BZT-MDA			
	1-(Benzo[d]thiazol-5-yl)-N-methylpropan-2-amine	5-BZT-MDMA			
	1-(1,3-Benzothiazol-6-yl)propan-2-amine	6-BZT-MDA		1896565-11-9	
	1-(Benzo[d]thiazol-6-yl)-N-methylpropan-2-amine	6-BZT-MDMA			
	1-(Benzo[d][1,3]oxathiol-5-yl)propan-2-amine	SDA; 3T-MDA			
	1-(Benzo[d][1,3]oxathiol-5-yl)-N-methylpropan-2-amine	SDMA; 3T-MDMA	MY100		
	1-(Benzo[d][1,3]oxathiol-5-yl)-N,N-dimethylpropan-2-amine		MY101		
	1-(Benzo[d][1,3]oxathiol-6-yl)-N-methylpropan-2-amine		MY200		
	6-(2-Aminopropyl)-5-methoxy-1,3-benzoxathiol	4T-MMDA-2		133787-69-6	
	1-(Imidazo[1,2-a]pyridin-6-yl)propan-2-amine			1337128-11-6	
	1-(1,2,3-Benzothiadiazol-5-yl)propan-2-amine			1380044-39-2	
	1-(Quinoxalin-6-yl)propan-2-amine			910407-54-4	
	1-(2,1,3-Benzoxadiazol-5-yl)propan-2-amine			910413-33-1	
	1-(2,1,3-Benzoxadiazol-5-yl)-N-methylpropan-2-amine	ODMA		2567501-96-4	
	1-(2,1,3-Benzothiadiazol-5-yl)-N-methylpropan-2-amine	TDMA		2302389-87-1	
	1-(2,1,3-Benzoselenadiazol-5-yl)-N-methylpropan-2-amine	SeDMA			

== See also ==
- Substituted ethylenedioxyphenethylamine (EDxx)
- Substituted methoxyphenethylamine
- 2Cs, DOx, 4Cs, 25-NB
- Substituted 2-aminoindane
- Substituted amphetamine
- Substituted benzofuran
- Substituted benzothiophene
- Substituted cathinone
- Substituted phenethylamine
- Substituted phenylmorpholine
- Substituted tryptamine
- Aminopropylindole
- PiHKAL
- The Shulgin Index
