= MADAM-6 =

Clinical data
- Other names: 6-Methyl-MDMA; 2,N-Dimethyl-4,5-methylenedioxyamphetamine
- Routes of administration: Oral
- ATC code: None

Pharmacokinetic data
- Duration of action: Unknown

Identifiers
- IUPAC name: N-methyl-1-(6-methyl-2H-1,3-benzodioxol-5-yl)propan-2-amine
- CAS Number: 207740-46-3
- PubChem CID: 44719578
- ChemSpider: 21106340
- UNII: W3H6GHJ73C
- CompTox Dashboard (EPA): DTXSID80660368

Chemical and physical data
- Formula: C_{12}H_{17}NO_{2}
- Molar mass: 207.273 g·mol^{−1}
- 3D model (JSmol): Interactive image
- SMILES: C1(=CC2=C(C=C1CC(C)NC)OCO2)C
- InChI: InChI=1S/C12H17NO2/c1-8-4-11-12(15-7-14-11)6-10(8)5-9(2)13-3/h4,6,9,13H,5,7H2,1-3H3; Key:CRQPDNIUPWXPNK-UHFFFAOYSA-N

MADAM-6, also known as 2,N-dimethyl-4,5-methylenedioxyamphetamine or as 6-methyl-MDMA, is a drug of the phenethylamine, amphetamine, and MDxx families related to MDMA.

== Use and effects ==
In his book PiHKAL (Phenethylamines I Have Known and Loved), Alexander Shulgin lists MADAM-6's dose as greater than 280 mg orally and its duration as unknown. MADAM-6 produced few to no effects at tested doses and Shulgin described it as "not active".

== History ==
MADAM-6 was first described in the literature by Alexander Shulgin in his book PiHKAL (Phenethylamines I Have Known and Loved) in 1991.

== Research ==
MADAM-6 has been studied for its potential antiparkinsonian effects. However, no clinical trials suggest the drug is effective against Parkinson's disease.

== See also ==
- Substituted methylenedioxyphenethylamine
