= Methylenedioxybutylamphetamine =

MDBU

Clinical data
- Other names: MDBU; 3,4-Methylenedioxy-N-butylamphetamine; N-Butyl-MDA
- Routes of administration: Oral
- ATC code: None

Pharmacokinetic data
- Duration of action: Unknown

Identifiers
- IUPAC name: N-[1-(2H-1,3-benzodioxol-5-yl)propan-2-yl]butan-1-amine
- CAS Number: 74698-38-7
- PubChem CID: 16206440
- ChemSpider: 17334605
- UNII: 934E9JU8H5
- CompTox Dashboard (EPA): DTXSID40583322

Chemical and physical data
- Formula: C_{14}H_{21}NO_{2}
- Molar mass: 235.327 g·mol^{−1}
- 3D model (JSmol): Interactive image
- SMILES: C1=C2C(=CC=C1CC(C)NCCCC)OCO2
- InChI: InChI=1S/C14H21NO2/c1-3-4-7-15-11(2)8-12-5-6-13-14(9-12)17-10-16-13/h5-6,9,11,15H,3-4,7-8,10H2,1-2H3; Key:RDXVRDCQDITVDV-UHFFFAOYSA-N

MDBU, also known as 3,4-methylenedioxy-N-butylamphetamine or as N-butyl-MDA, is a lesser-known drug. It is the N-butyl derivative of 3,4-methylenedioxyamphetamine (MDA).

== Use and effects ==
In his book PiHKAL (Phenethylamines I Have Known and Loved), Alexander Shulgin lists MDBU's minimum dose as 40 mg orally and its duration as unknown. MDBU produced few to no effects at tested doses.

== Chemistry ==
=== Synthesis ===
The chemical synthesis of MDBU has been described.

== See also ==
- Substituted methylenedioxyphenethylamine
