= MDDMA =

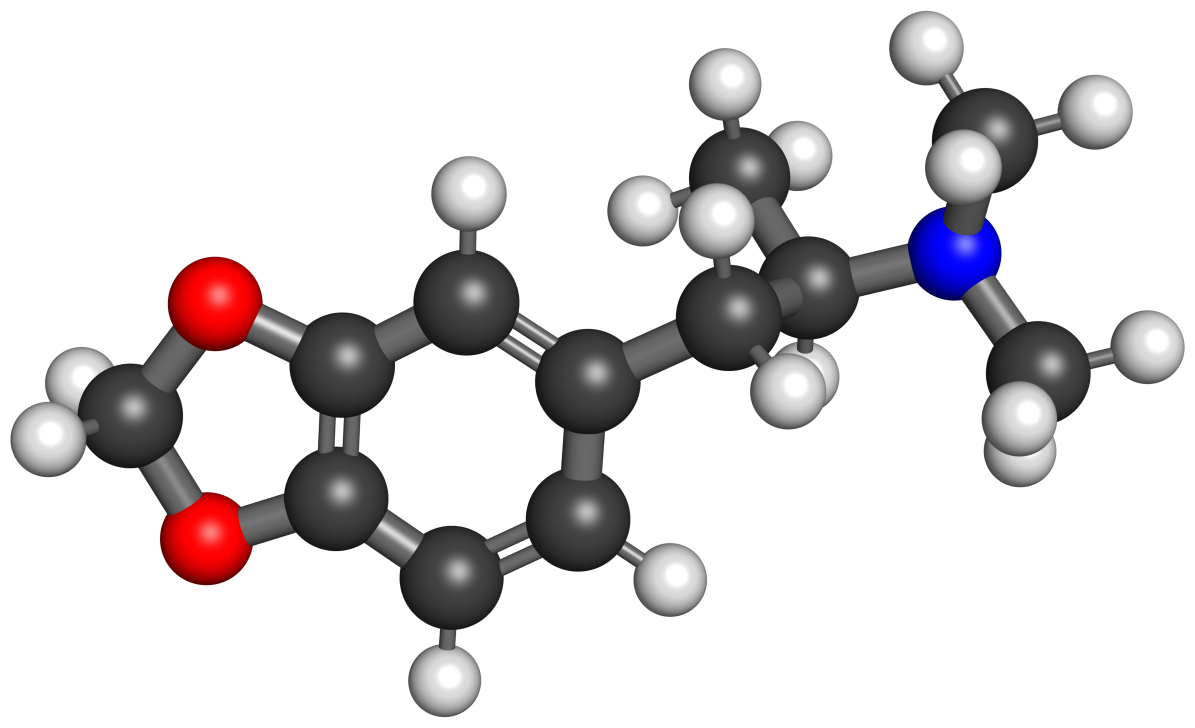

Clinical data
- Other names: 3,4-Methylenedioxy-N,N-dimethylamphetamine; 3,4-Methylenedioxy-(α,N,N-trimethyl)-1-ethane; MDDM; MDDMA; N,N-Dimethyl-MDA; N-Methyl-MDMA
- Routes of administration: Oral
- Drug class: Serotonin releasing agent; Serotonin 5-HT_{2A} receptor agonist; Psychoactive drug
- ATC code: None

Pharmacokinetic data
- Duration of action: Unknown

Identifiers
- IUPAC name: 1-(2H-1,3-benzodioxol-5-yl)-N,N-dimethylpropan-2-amine
- CAS Number: 74698-50-3
- PubChem CID: 551630
- ChemSpider: 479880
- UNII: L6K8DR1S8O
- CompTox Dashboard (EPA): DTXSID701024545

Chemical and physical data
- Formula: C_{12}H_{17}NO_{2}
- Molar mass: 207.273 g·mol^{−1}
- 3D model (JSmol): Interactive image
- Melting point: 172 to 173 °C (342 to 343 °F)
- SMILES: CC(Cc1ccc2c(c1)OCO2)N(C)C
- InChI: InChI=1S/C12H17NO2/c1-9(13(2)3)6-10-4-5-11-12(7-10)15-8-14-11/h4-5,7,9H,6,8H2,1-3H3; Key:JEJGUIDNYBAPGN-UHFFFAOYSA-N

MDDMA, or MDDM, also known as 3,4-methylenedioxy-N,N-dimethylamphetamine or as N,N-dimethyl-MDA or N-methyl-MDMA, is a psychoactive drug of the phenethylamine, amphetamine, and MDxx families. It is the N,N-dimethyl analogue of MDA and the N-methyl derivative of MDMA. The drug is a known synthetic impurity of MDMA and has also been described as a possible novel designer drug in 2025. In addition, (R)-MDDMA was characterized as a non-hallucinogenic psychoplastogen with antidepressant-like effects and improved safety relative to MDMA in 2026.

== Use and effects ==
In his book PiHKAL (Phenethylamines I Have Known and Loved), Alexander Shulgin lists MDDMA's dose as greater than 150 mg orally and its duration as unknown. Findings on the effects of MDDMA are very mixed. In two reports, with 150 mg and 1,000 mg both orally, no effects whatsoever occurred. In another report, 550 mg orally resulted in very negative effects. Finally, two people who used 200 mg orally found that it produced very pleasant effects for 20 minutes, wore off, but then resurged to produce even stronger effects 4 hours later. The higher-dose reports were communicated to Shulgin anonymously and he was uncertain whether the actual substance employed was indeed MDDMA. More research seems necessary to characterize MDDMA, but Shulgin expected that a "pretty hefty dose" would be required for it to produce effects.

== Pharmacology ==
=== Pharmacodynamics ===
MDDMA shows reduced potency as a monoamine releasing agent and reuptake inhibitor compared to MDA and MDMA. It was 11-fold less potent than MDMA and 4-fold less potent than MDA as a serotonin releasing agent (SRA). Moreover, whereas MDA and MDMA are serotonin–norepinephrine–dopamine releasing agents (SNDRAs), MDDMA is a selective SRA along with ≥10-fold weaker dopamine and norepinephrine reuptake inhibition. The related drug MDTMA is completely inactive as a monoamine releasing agent, though it does still show very weak monoamine reuptake inhibition. Another related drug, dimethylamphetamine, is said to be a prodrug of methamphetamine and amphetamine, although it is much less potent and weaker than these drugs.

(R)-MDDMA has been found be inactive as a serotonin releasing agent but to act as a partial agonist of the serotonin 5-HT_{2A} and 5-HT_{2C} receptors. Conversely, unlike MDMA, it was inactive as a serotonin 5-HT_{2B} receptor agonist. In animal studies, (R)-MDDMA did not produce the head-twitch response, affect body temperature, or induce hyperlocomotion, and showed diminished or no prosocial effects. On the other hand, it produced psychoplastogenic effects mediated by serotonin 5-HT_{2} receptor activation as well as promoted fear extinction and induced antidepressant-like effects. It was concluded that (R)-MDDMA is a non-hallucinogenic psychoplastogen with improved safety compared to MDMA and (R)-MDMA.

=== Pharmacokinetics ===
It is possible that MDDMA could be partially demethylated into MDMA. However, based on (R)-MDDMA and (R)-MDMA having very different effects in animals, such conversion appears to be limited.

== Chemistry ==
=== Synthesis ===
The chemical synthesis of MDDMA has been described.

=== Impurity ===
MDDMA is occasionally encountered as an impurity in MDMA which has been synthesized by methylation of MDA using methylating chemical reagents such as methyl iodide. An excess of reagent or a reaction temperature that is too high results in some double methylation of the amine nitrogen, yielding MDDMA as well as MDMA. The presence of MDDMA as an impurity can thus reveal which synthetic route was used to manufacture seized samples of MDMA.

=== Analogues ===
Analogues of MDDMA include MDA, MDMA, MDTMA (N,N,N-trimethyl-MDA) and dimethylone (βk-MDDMA), among others.

== History ==
MDDMA was first described in the scientific literature by Alexander Shulgin and colleagues by 1980. Subsequently, it was described in greater detail by Shulgin in his book PiHKAL (Phenethylamines I Have Known and Loved) in 1991. The drug was described as a possible novel designer drug in 2025. David E. Olson and colleagues characterized (R)-MDDMA as a non-hallucinogenic psychoplastogen with antidepressant-like effects and improved safety relative to MDMA in 2026.

== Society and culture ==
=== Legal status ===
==== Canada ====
MDDMA is a controlled substance in Canada.

==== United Kingdom ====
This substance is a Class A drug in the Drugs controlled by the UK Misuse of Drugs Act.

== Research ==
(R)-MDDMA may have therapeutic potential with improved safety compared to MDMA.

== See also ==
- Substituted methylenedioxyphenethylamine
- List of investigational hallucinogens and entactogens
- Delix Therapeutics
