= MDTFEA =

Clinical data
- Other names: MDTFE; MDCF_{3}; 3,4-Methylenedioxy-N-(2,2,2-trifluoroethyl)amphetamine; N-(2,2,2-Trifluoroethyl)-3,4-methylenedioxyamphetamine
- Routes of administration: Oral
- Drug class: Psychoactive drug
- ATC code: None

Pharmacokinetic data
- Duration of action: Unknown

Identifiers
- IUPAC name: 1-(1,3-benzodioxol-5-yl)-N-(2,2,2-trifluoroethyl)propan-2-amine
- PubChem CID: 167488918

Chemical and physical data
- Formula: C_{12}H_{14}F_{3}NO_{2}
- Molar mass: 261.244 g·mol^{−1}
- 3D model (JSmol): Interactive image
- SMILES: CC(CC1=CC2=C(C=C1)OCO2)NCC(F)(F)F
- InChI: InChI=1S/C12H14F3NO2/c1-8(16-6-12(13,14)15)4-9-2-3-10-11(5-9)18-7-17-10/h2-3,5,8,16H,4,6-7H2,1H3; Key:MWFPHJXMCQTNGG-UHFFFAOYSA-N

MDTFEA, also known as 3,4-methylenedioxy-N-(2,2,2-trifluoroethyl)amphetamine, is a chemical compound and possible psychoactive drug of the phenethylamine, amphetamine, and MDxx families related to the entactogen MDEA. It is the derivative of MDEA in which the ethyl group on the amine has been replaced with a trifluoroethyl group.

Alexander Shulgin briefly described MDTFEA in his book PiHKAL (Phenethylamines I Have Known and Loved). Based on personal communication to Shulgin, it was described as "possibly active". The drug was tested at a highest total dose of 500 mg orally, which was given in three divided doses over a period of 5 or 6 hours. The effects included only a very mild intoxication and little or no sympathomimetic effects, with these possible effects being short-lasting. For comparison, MDEA has a listed dose of 100 to 200 mg orally and a duration of 3 to 5 hours. Daniel Trachsel has said that MDTFEA seems to be inactive.

The chemical synthesis of MDTFEA has been described.

MDTFEA was first described in the scientific literature by Shulgin in PiHKAL in 1991. It was not synthesized or tested by Shulgin but was instead described to him via personal communication.

== See also ==
- Substituted methylenedioxyphenethylamine
