= Promecarb =

Names
- Preferred IUPAC name 3-Methyl-5-(propan-2-yl)phenyl methylcarbamate
- Other names 5-Methyl-m-cumenyl methylcarbamate

Identifiers
CAS Number	2631-37-0
3D model (JSmol)	Interactive image
ChemSpider	16563
ECHA InfoCard	100.018.285
PubChem CID	17516
UNII	1QRP20775S
CompTox Dashboard (EPA)	DTXSID4037617
- InChI: InChI=1S/C12H17NO2/c1-8(2)10-5-9(3)6-11(7-10)15-12(14)13-4/h5-8H,1-4H3,(H,13,14) Key: DTAPQAJKAFRNJB-UHFFFAOYSA-N; InChI=1/C12H17NO2/c1-8(2)10-5-9(3)6-11(7-10)15-12(14)13-4/h5-8H,1-4H3,(H,13,14) Key: DTAPQAJKAFRNJB-UHFFFAOYAG
- SMILES: O=C(Oc1cc(cc(c1)C(C)C)C)NC

Properties
Chemical formula	C_{12}H_{17}NO_{2}
Molar mass	207.273 g·mol^{−1}
- Except where otherwise noted, data are given for materials in their standard state (at 25 °C [77 °F], 100 kPa). Infobox references

Promecarb (chemical formula: C_{12}H_{17}NO_{2}) is a chemical compound previously used as an insecticide.
