= Methylenedioxyhydroxyethylamphetamine =

MDHOET

Clinical data
- Other names: 3,4-Methylenedioxy-N-hydroxyethylamphetamine; MDOHET; MDHET; MDHEA; N-Hydroxyethyl-MDA
- Routes of administration: Oral
- ATC code: None

Pharmacokinetic data
- Duration of action: Unknown

Identifiers
- IUPAC name: 2-{[(2H-1,3-benzodioxol-5-yl)propan-2-yl]amino}ethan-1-ol
- CAS Number: 74698-43-4
- PubChem CID: 21645837
- ChemSpider: 15637662
- UNII: 8DVH9HP8WG
- CompTox Dashboard (EPA): DTXSID30616572

Chemical and physical data
- Formula: C_{12}H_{17}NO_{3}
- Molar mass: 223.272 g·mol^{−1}
- 3D model (JSmol): Interactive image
- SMILES: C1=C2C(=CC=C1CC(C)NCCO)OCO2
- InChI: InChI=1S/C12H17NO3/c1-9(13-4-5-14)6-10-2-3-11-12(7-10)16-8-15-11/h2-3,7,9,13-14H,4-6,8H2,1H3; Key:SCUUYKMQDUDNBP-UHFFFAOYSA-N

MDHOET, also known as 3,4-methylenedioxy-N-hydroxyethylamphetamine or as N-hydroxyethyl-MDA, is a lesser-known drug and a substituted amphetamine. It is also the N-hydroxyethyl analogue of MDA.

== Use and effects ==
In his book PiHKAL (Phenethylamines I Have Known and Loved), Alexander Shulgin lists MDHOET's dose as greater than 50 mg orally and its duration as unknown. MDHOET produced few to no effects.

== Chemistry ==
=== Synthesis ===
The chemical synthesis of MDHOET has been described.

== Society and culture ==
=== Legal status ===
==== United Kingdom ====
This substance is a Class A drug in the Drugs controlled by the UK Misuse of Drugs Act.

== See also ==
- Substituted methylenedioxyphenethylamine
