= 2,3-Methylenedioxymethamphetamine =

Chemical compound

ORTHO-MDMA

Clinical data
- Other names: 2,3-MDMA; 2,3-Methylenedioxy-N-methylamphetamine; ORTHO-MDMA
- ATC code: None

Identifiers
- IUPAC name: 1-(1,3-Benzodioxol-4-yl)-N-methylpropan-2-amine
- CAS Number: 168967-99-5
- PubChem CID: 95162631
- ChemSpider: 23255735
- UNII: QNH0322FHX

Chemical and physical data
- Formula: C_{11}H_{15}NO_{2}
- Molar mass: 193.246 g·mol^{−1}
- 3D model (JSmol): Interactive image
- SMILES: CC(CC1=C2C(=CC=C1)OCO2)NC
- InChI: InChI=1S/C11H15NO2/c1-8(12-2)6-9-4-3-5-10-11(9)14-7-13-10/h3-5,8,12H,6-7H2,1-2H3/t8-/m0/s1; Key:RTZIIFGBTSUSEL-QMMMGPOBSA-N

2,3-Methylenedioxymethamphetamine, also known as 2,3-MDMA or ORTHO-MDMA, is a positional isomer of the recreational drug 3,4-MDMA (commonly known as Ecstasy or Molly). It is a monoamine transporter (MAT) substrate and inhibitor similarly to 3,4-MDMA. However, while showing similar potency at the norepinephrine transporter (NET), 2,3-MDMA is less potent at the serotonin transporter (SERT). 2,3-MDMA has not been encountered as a recreational or designer drug.

== See also ==
- Substituted methylenedioxyphenethylamine
- 2,3-Methylenedioxyamphetamine (2,3-MDA)
- 1-Naphthylmethcathinone (AMAPN)
