= 5-Methoxymethylone =

Chemical compound of the cathinone class

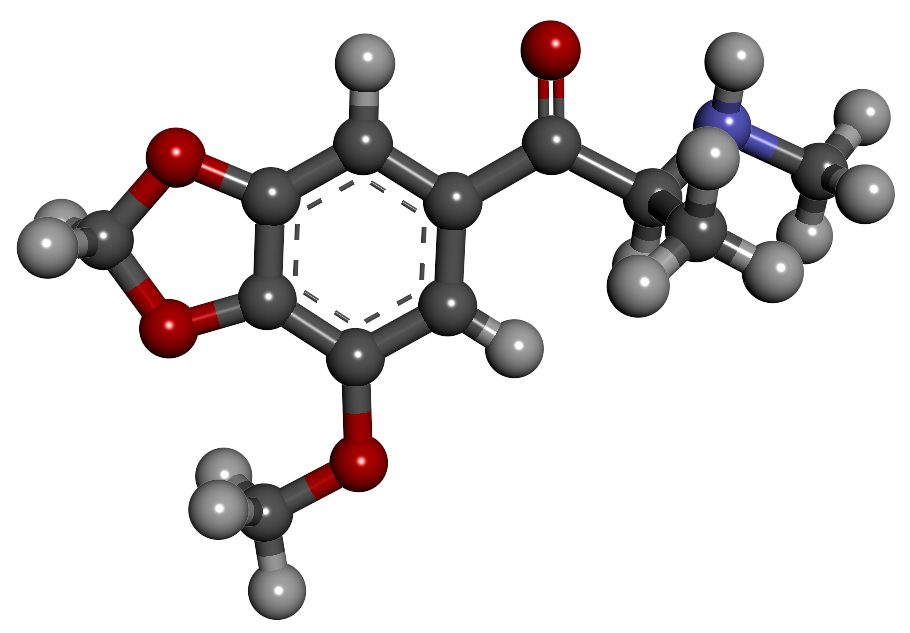

Clinical data
- Routes of administration: Oral, insufflation

Legal status
- Legal status: CA: Schedule I; DE: NpSG (Industrial and scientific use only); UK: Class B; US: Unscheduled but possible analog of Methylone or MDMA; Illegal in Hungary

Identifiers
- IUPAC name: 1-(7-Methoxy-benzo[1,3]dioxol-5-yl)-2-methylamino-propan-1-one
- CAS Number: 2230716-98-8
- PubChem CID: 132988634
- ChemSpider: 129433846
- UNII: W4E3L5NY7Z

Chemical and physical data
- Formula: C_{12}H_{15}NO_{4}
- Molar mass: 237.255 g·mol^{−1}
- 3D model (JSmol): Interactive image
- SMILES: CC(NC)C(C1=CC(OC)=C(OCO2)C2=C1)=O
- InChI: InChI=1S/C12H15NO4/c1-7(13-2)11(14)8-4-9(15-3)12-10(5-8)16-6-17-12/h4-5,7,13H,6H2,1-3H3; Key:MPMHRFOOZMFFBD-UHFFFAOYSA-N

5-Methoxymethylone (also known as 2-A1MP and βk-MMDMA) is a chemical compound of the cathinone class which has been sold online as a designer drug. It is the beta-ketone version of 5-Methoxy-MDMA. The more common name 2-AIMP/2-A1MP does not appear to relate to the molecular structure. In comparison with methylone, the two compounds differ by the addition of a methoxy group at the 5th carbon atom of the aromatic ring. The toxicity of this compound is unknown.

== Legal status ==
5-Methoxymethylone is listed as an illegal drug under the name 2-A1MP in Hungary.

== See also ==
- Substituted methylenedioxyphenethylamine
- Lophophine
- 5-Methylethylone
- 5-Methyl-MDA
