= Dioscorine =

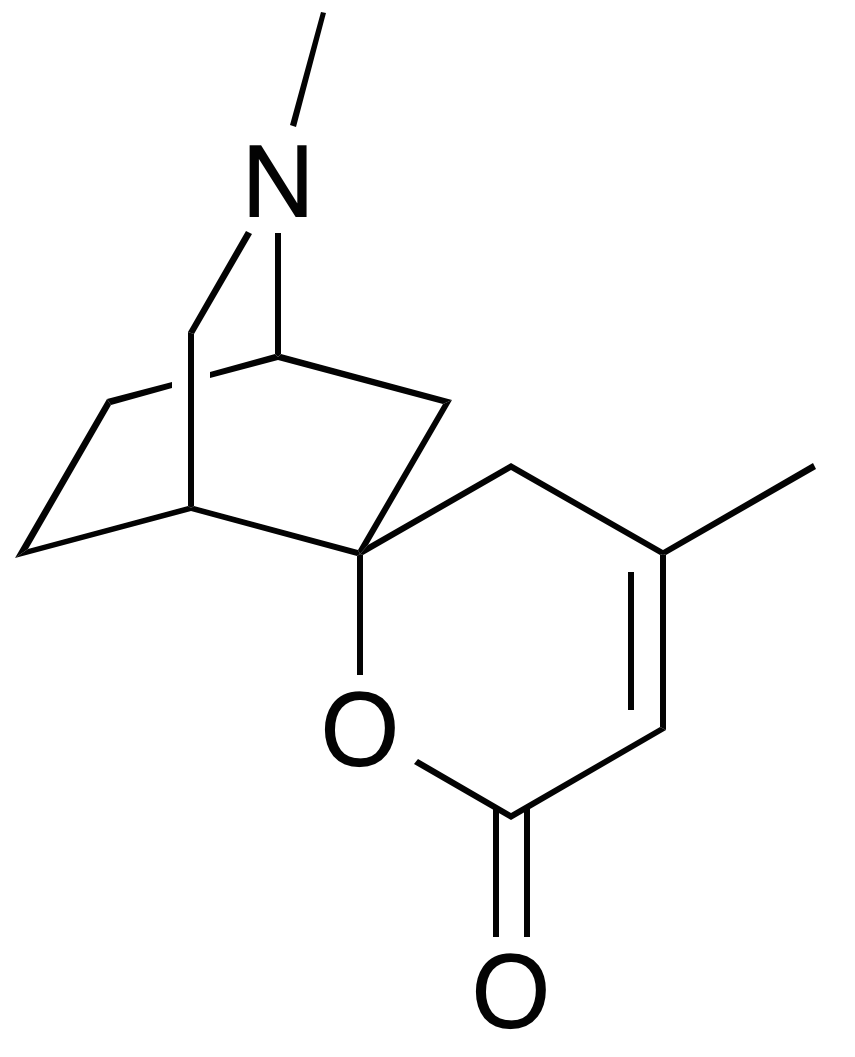

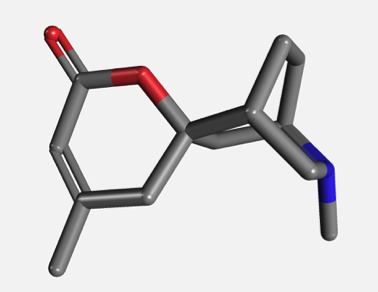

Names
- Preferred IUPAC name (1R,2S,4R)-4′,8-Dimethyl-8-azaspiro[bicyclo[2.2.2]octane-2,2′-pyran]-6′(3′H)-one

Identifiers
CAS Number	3329-91-7
3D model (JSmol)	Interactive image
ChEBI	CHEBI:4628
ChemSpider	10194088
KEGG	C10142
PubChem CID	442635
UNII	Q4HFK9JJ1M
CompTox Dashboard (EPA)	DTXSID00877299
- InChI: InChI=1S/C13H19NO2/c1-9-5-12(15)16-13(6-9)7-11-4-3-10(13)8-14(11)2/h5,10-11H,3-4,6-8H2,1-2H3/t10-,11-,13+/m1/s1 Key: YBQKKTNDAXVYGX-WZRBSPASSA-N; InChI=1S/C13H19NO2/c1-9-5-12(15)16-13(6-9)7-11-4-3-10(13)8-14(11)2/h5,10-11H,3-4,6-8H2,1-2H3 Key: YBQKKTNDAXVYGX-UHFFFAOYSA-N
- SMILES: CC1=CC(=O)O[C@@]2(C1)C[C@H]3CC[C@@H]2CN3C

Properties
Chemical formula	C_{13}H_{19}NO_{2}
Molar mass	221.300 g·mol^{−1}
Density	1.155 g/cm^{3}
Melting point	54 °C (129 °F; 327 K)
Chiral rotation ([α]_{D})	-35° (in 3.4% chloroform)
Refractive index (n_{D})	1.555

Hazards
Flash point	146.466 °C (295.639 °F; 419.616 K)
- Except where otherwise noted, data are given for materials in their standard state (at 25 °C [77 °F], 100 kPa). Infobox references

Dioscorine is an alkaloid toxin isolated from the tubers of tropical yam on several continents. It has been used as a monkey poison in some African countries, and as an arrow poison to aid in hunting in several parts of Asia. It was first isolated from Dioscorea hirsute (synonymous with Dioscorea hirsuta) by Boorsma in 1894 and obtained in a crystalline form by Schutte in 1897, and has since been found in other Dioscorea species. Dioscorine is a neurotoxin that acts by blocking the nicotinic acetylcholine receptor. Dioscorine is generally isolated in tandem with other alkaloids such as dioscin but is usually the most potent toxin in the mixture. It is a convulsant, producing symptoms similar to picrotoxin, with which it shares a similar mechanism of action. (Dioscorine is not to be confused with dioscorin, the yam storage protein.)

== Origin and uses ==
Dioscorine was first isolated from the tubers of Dioscorea hirsuta by Boorsma in 1894, and the tubers of Dioscorea hispida by Levya and Gutierrez in 1937. It was obtained in a crystalline condition by Schutte. In tropical lands, tubers from varieties of these species are eaten, but the alkaloid-bearing species are of toxicological interest because of their poisoning abilities. Dioscorine produces insecticidal and antifeedant responses in various species of insects, but has more interesting historical applications. These are dependent on the geographical location of the specific tuber (Table 1). Poisoning from dioscorine first appeared from accidental food poisoning from the yam, especially during periods of severe drought in many parts of Africa. People then began making the distinction between edible and toxic plants, and put the toxins to use in hunting. Cases of poisoning have officially been reported since the 1930s but had been happening earlier.

Table 1: Main tuber sources and historical applications of dioscorine
Species of tuber	Geographical Location	Uses	Other notes
D. dumetorum	Tropical and subtropical Africa; tropical parts of East Java	Schistosomiasis in Tanganyika and tuber as monkey poison by Zulus	Produces symptoms like drunkenness but is edible after soaking in water for several days
D. hirsuta	Asia	Fish and arrow poison	Edible when cooked
D. rupicola	East Cape Province; Natal	Fish poison	Eaten when boiled by the Zulu in times of famine

== Chemical Properties ==
Dioscorine is an alkaloid with a 6-membered nitrogen-containing heterocycle. Pinder extensively discussed the method of extraction of and the chemical substitution of dioscorine (Figure 1). From his studies, Pinder also concluded that 2-oxotropane is a degradation product of dioscorine and described the formula of the alkaloid.

Dioscorine derives its basic nature and nucleophilicity from the tertiary amine and carbonyl functional groups.

Table 2. Melting point of dioscorine and three of its salts
Species (salt) of dioscorine	Melting Point (°C)
Free base	54
Hydrochloride	204
Methiodide	213
Picrate (2,4,6-trinitrophenolate)	183

Dioscorine is completely soluble in a number of hydrophilic solvents (water, ethanol, acetone) but only slightly soluble in hydrophobic and mostly non-polar solvents (chloroform, ether, benzene, petroleum ether).

Alkaloids are generally pale yellow liquids with an aromatic smell. Dioscorine is opalescent, that is, it appears yellowish-red in transmitted light and blue in scattered light perpendicular to the transmitted light.

=== Biosynthesis ===
Dioscorine is one of few alkaloids to possess an isolated isoquinuclidine nucleus that is not part of a condensed ring system, unlike catharanthine or other indole alkaloids. Its biosynthesis starts with trigonelline (nicotinic acid methylated at the nitrogen). The pathway was anticipated by the known reactivity of trigonelline. The process yields dumetorine as a side product. Dumetorine is an alkaloid that can be isolated from Dioscorea dumetorum.

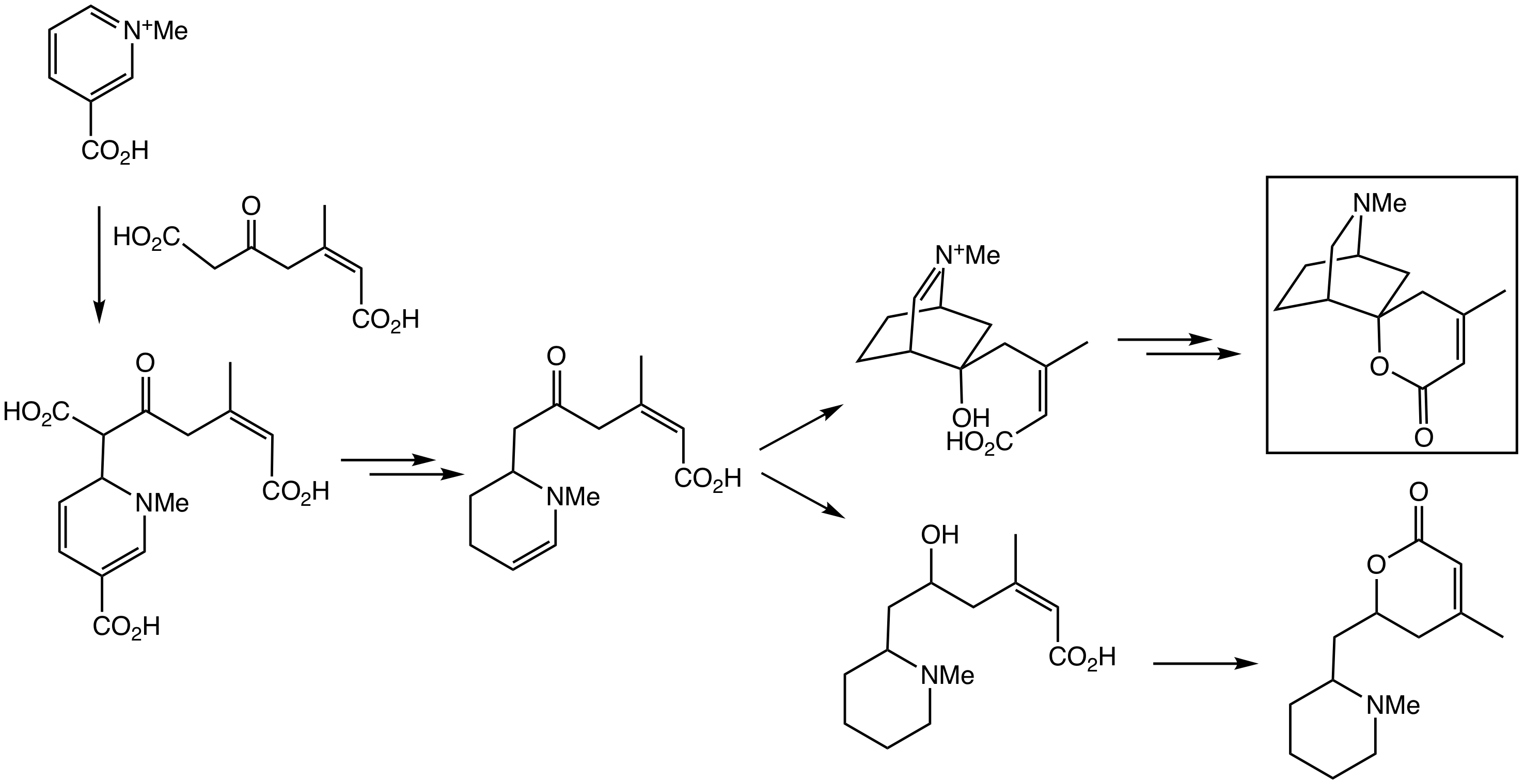
Biosynthesis of dioscorine (highlighted) and dumetorine from trigonelline in Dioscorea hispida.

== Biological Effects ==
Dioscorine is a neurotoxin. It acts as an antagonist of the nicotinic acetylcholine receptor (nAChR) by physically blocking an open ion channel, leading to hyperpolarization of the neuron. Nagata et al. studied the effects of dioscorine on the nicotinic acetylcholine receptor in rat clonal phaeochromocytoma cells (mixture of neuroblasts and eosinophils). They found that dioscorine at concentrations of 0.45-450 μM accelerated the desensitization of current induced by 100 uM acetylcholine, suppressing the current in a dose-dependent manner. Dioscorine itself did not induce any current at concentrations between 0.45 and 450 μM, suggesting that it might act as a receptor antagonist for the nAChR (as opposed to agonist or inverse agonist). Co-application of dioscorine and acetylcholine at the surface of the ion channel decreased the mean open time and mean closed time, as well as the duration of the current burst. These changes in single-channel kinetics by dioscorine significantly reduce the total charge carried through the open channels, explaining the suppressive effect of dioscorine on the nAChR, and its toxicity.

At the molecular level, dioscorine enters and physically blocks the ion channels when they are open, causing a conformational change in the channel proteins. This increases the affinity of dioscorine for its binding site. The ion channels involved are normally those associated with the N-methyl-D-aspartate (NMDA) and GABA receptors that are modulated by Ca^{2+} ions. The Ca^{2+} ions enter through the nAChR in the presynaptic membranes. Therefore, apart from physical blocking of the ion channel, dioscorine could also be indirectly inhibiting the activity of ion channels through the secondary messenger system mediated by Ca^{2+} ions and a cascade of various synaptic events.

== Pharmacological Effects ==
=== Symptoms ===
In humans, physiological responses range from dizziness, nausea, vomiting and sleepiness. At large doses, convulsions result, and death usually occurs in extensor spasms. The interaction of dioscorine with the nAChR also results in local anesthetic effects: dioscorine in 0.5% solution has approximately the same activity as 0.05% cocaine. Dioscorine also shows antidiuretic activity and depressant actions.

=== Toxicity ===
Dioscorine is reported to be one of the most potent alkaloid toxins isolated from yam. It has an LD_{50} of 60 mg/kg in mice through an intraperitoneal route of administration. When injected into monkeys, it has a mydriatic action (that is, it causes the pupils to dilate), and resembles the pharmacological action of picrotoxin and cardiac glycosides.

=== Diagnostic tests ===
Van Itallie and Bylsma, in 1930, described the following chemical tests for dioscorine:

1) A solution of this alkaloid in sulfuric acid turns yellow when a small amount of iodic acid is added to it. From the edge, the yellow color changes slowly to reddish-violet. Which in turn changes to bluish-violet.

2) When a drop of diluted solution of sodium nitroprusside and a few drops of sodium hydroxide are mixed with dioscorine, a reddish-violet color appears after a short while.

3) If dioscorine is heated with sulfuric acid on a water bath, a reddish-violet color appears slowly.

== Treatment (Antidote) ==
Since dioscorine is as a cholinergic receptor ligand, any stronger agonist of the nAChR can serve as valid antidote of dioscorine. If added in a concentration higher than dioscorine, it can competitively displace the latter from the receptor. Several developed antidotes are aza-bridged bicyclic amine derivatives.

An anesthetic, pentobarbital sodium, was often administered to mice during toxicity experiments involving dioscorine. Convulsions in humans can be readily antagonized with this compound.
