= Meprylcaine =

Chemical compound

Legal status
- Legal status: UK: Under Psychoactive Substances Act

Identifiers
- IUPAC name: benzoic acid (2-methyl-2-propylaminopropyl) ester
- CAS Number: 495-70-5
- PubChem CID: 4065
- ChemSpider: 3925
- UNII: 82YT7WU9PW
- ChEMBL: ChEMBL127810
- CompTox Dashboard (EPA): DTXSID70197810

Chemical and physical data
- Formula: C_{14}H_{21}NO_{2}
- Molar mass: 235.327 g·mol^{−1}
- 3D model (JSmol): Interactive image
- SMILES: CC(COC(C1=CC=CC=C1)=O)(C)NCCC
- InChI: InChI=1S/C14H21NO2/c1-4-10-15-14(2,3)11-17-13(16)12-8-6-5-7-9-12/h5-9,15H,4,10-11H2,1-3H3; Key:VXJABHHJLXLNMP-UHFFFAOYSA-N

Meprylcaine (also known as Epirocaine and Oracaine) is a local anesthetic with stimulant properties that is structurally related to dimethocaine.

Meprylcaine has a relatively potent inhibitory action on the monoamine transporter and inhibits the reuptake of dopamine, norepinephrine and serotonin.

== Synthesis ==
Thieme Synthesis: Patents:

The 2-methyl-2-(propylamino)propan-1-ol [55968-10-0] (1) is treated with base and then with Benzoyl chloride (2), completing the synthesis of Meprycaine (3).
