= MMDA-3b =

Clinical data
- Other names: 4-MeO-2,3-MDA; 4-Methoxy-2,3-methylenedioxyamphetamine; 2,3-Methylenedioxy-4-methoxyamphetamine; 4-Methoxy-ORTHO-MDA; 4-MeO-ORTHO-MDA
- Routes of administration: Oral
- Drug class: Serotonergic psychedelic; Hallucinogen; Serotonin releasing agent
- ATC code: None

Pharmacokinetic data
- Onset of action: Unknown
- Duration of action: Unknown

Identifiers
- IUPAC name: 1-(7-methoxy-1,3-benzodioxol-4-yl)propan-2-amine
- CAS Number: 23693-20-1
- PubChem CID: 44374894
- ChemSpider: 23231727
- UNII: FM6SU6FD7Y
- ChEMBL: ChEMBL159299

Chemical and physical data
- Formula: C_{11}H_{15}NO_{3}
- Molar mass: 209.245 g·mol^{−1}
- 3D model (JSmol): Interactive image
- SMILES: CC(CC1=C2C(=C(C=C1)OC)OCO2)N
- InChI: InChI=1S/C11H15NO3/c1-7(12)5-8-3-4-9(13-2)11-10(8)14-6-15-11/h3-4,7H,5-6,12H2,1-2H3; Key:CLRZDDLQTLKYFH-UHFFFAOYSA-N

MMDA-3b, also known as 4-methoxy-2,3-methylenedioxyamphetamine (4-MeO-2,3-MDA), is a psychedelic drug of the phenethylamine, amphetamine, and MDxx families related to ORTHO-MDA (2,3-MDA). It is the 4-methoxy derivative of ORTHO-MDA and is a positional isomer of MMDA (5-MeO-3,4-MDA) and related compounds like MMDA-2 (6-MeO-3,4-MDA) and MMDA-3a (2-MeO-3,4-MDA).

MMDA-3b was included as an entry in Alexander Shulgin's book PiHKAL (Phenethylamines I Have Known and Loved). He lists its dose as greater than 80 mg orally and its duration as unknown. Shulgin describes 60 mg as being definitely active, qualitatively like 3,4-methylenedioxyamphetamine (MDA), but quantitatively perhaps less, whereas an 80 mg dose of MMDA-3b was said to be no more effective than the 60 mg dose. He also says that it is similar at these doses to 20 mg MMDA-3a and may be about 3-fold less potent than MMDA-3a. Elsewhere, MMDA-3b is described as 3-fold more potent than mescaline.

MMDA-3b has been found to act as an efficacious serotonin releasing agent with little effect on dopamine similarly to MMDA. For comparison, MDA and MDMA release both serotonin and dopamine, whereas MMDA-2 releases neither serotonin nor dopamine.

The chemical synthesis of MMDA-3b has been described. Other 2,3-MDA positional isomers of MMDA-3b include MMDA-4 and MMDA-5.

MMDA-3b was first described in the scientific literature by Shulgin in 1964. It was subsequently described in greater detail by Shulgin in his book PiHKAL in 1991. The drug is a controlled substance in Canada under phenethylamine blanket-ban language.

== See also ==
- Substituted methylenedioxyphenethylamine
- Methoxymethylenedioxyamphetamine (MMDA)
