= Methylenedioxycyclopropylmethylamphetamine =

MDCPM

Clinical data
- Other names: 3,4-Methylenedioxy-N-cyclopropylmethylamphetamine; MDCPM; N-Cyclopropylmethyl-MDA
- Routes of administration: Oral
- ATC code: None

Pharmacokinetic data
- Duration of action: Unknown

Identifiers
- IUPAC name: N-(cyclopropylmethyl)-1-(2H-1,3-benzodioxol-5-yl)propan-2-amine
- CAS Number: 22698-08-4
- PubChem CID: 71308239
- ChemSpider: 21106332
- UNII: X8VGM9CN9J
- CompTox Dashboard (EPA): DTXSID60745440

Chemical and physical data
- Formula: C_{14}H_{19}NO_{2}
- Molar mass: 233.311 g·mol^{−1}
- 3D model (JSmol): Interactive image
- SMILES: C3OC1C(C=CC(=C1)CC(C)NCC2CC2)O3
- InChI: InChI=1S/C14H19NO2/c1-10(15-8-11-2-3-11)6-12-4-5-13-14(7-12)17-9-16-13/h4-5,7,10-11,15H,2-3,6,8-9H2,1H3; Key:AEIQNPMGFQNZNV-UHFFFAOYSA-N

MDCPM, also known as 3,4-methylenedioxy-N-cyclopropylmethylamphetamine or as N-cyclopropylmethyl-MDA, is a drug. It is the N-cyclopropylmethyl derivative of MDMA.

== Use and effects ==
In his book PiHKAL (Phenethylamines I Have Known and Loved), Alexander Shulgin lists MDCPM's minimum dose as 10 mg orally and its duration as unknown. MDCPM produces few to no effects.

== History ==
MDCPM was described in a patent by Horrom in 1972. Subsequently, it was described in greater detail by Alexander Shulgin in his book PiHKAL (Phenethylamines I Have Known and Loved).

== Chemistry ==
=== Synthesis ===
The chemical synthesis of MDCPM has been described.

== Society and culture ==
=== Legal status ===
==== United Kingdom ====
This substance is a Class A drug in the Drugs controlled by the UK Misuse of Drugs Act.

== See also ==
- Substituted methylenedioxyphenethylamine
