= 3,4-Methylenedioxy-N-propylamphetamine =

MDPR

Clinical data
- Other names: 3,4-Methylenedioxy-N-propylamphetamine; MDPR; N-Propyl-MDA
- Routes of administration: Oral
- Drug class: Psychoactive drug
- ATC code: None

Pharmacokinetic data
- Duration of action: Unknown

Identifiers
- IUPAC name: N-[1-(2H-1,3-benzodioxol-5-yl)propan-2-yl]propan-1-amine
- CAS Number: 74698-36-5
- PubChem CID: 559375
- ChemSpider: 486273
- UNII: B4W69BKX3L
- ChEMBL: ChEMBL197038
- CompTox Dashboard (EPA): DTXSID50339877
- ECHA InfoCard: 100.217.125

Chemical and physical data
- Formula: C_{13}H_{19}NO_{2}
- Molar mass: 221.300 g·mol^{−1}
- 3D model (JSmol): Interactive image
- SMILES: CC(NCCC)Cc1ccc2OCOc2c1
- InChI: InChI=1S/C13H19NO2/c1-3-6-14-10(2)7-11-4-5-12-13(8-11)16-9-15-12/h4-5,8,10,14H,3,6-7,9H2,1-2H3; Key:LBXMQBTXOLBCCA-UHFFFAOYSA-N

MDPR, also known as 3,4-methylenedioxy-N-propylamphetamine or as N-propyl-MDA, is a lesser-known psychoactive drug and a substituted amphetamine.

== Use and effects ==
In his book PiHKAL (Phenethylamines I Have Known and Loved), Alexander Shulgin lists MDPR's minimum dose as 200 mg orally and its duration as unknown. MDPR is described as a "promoter"; by itself it has almost no effects on the mind, but it promotes the effects of hallucinogens, similarly to the closely related MDPH. Shulgin reported that 160 mg of MDPR strongly enhanced the effects of a small (60 μg) dose of LSD, and that similar enhancement of hallucinogenic effect was noted when mixing MDPR with other drugs such as psilocybin, mescaline, 2C-B, and 2C-T-7. The reason for this synergistic action of MDPR has not been elucidated.

== Chemistry ==
=== Synthesis ===
The chemical synthesis of MDPR has been described.

== See also ==
- Substituted methylenedioxyphenethylamine
- Phenylpropylaminopentane
- MDAL
