= 3,4-Methylenedioxy-N-isopropylamphetamine =

MDIP

Clinical data
- Other names: 3,4-Methylenedioxy-N-isopropylamphetamine; MDIP; MDIPA; N-Isopropyl-MDA
- Routes of administration: Oral
- ATC code: None

Pharmacokinetic data
- Duration of action: Unknown

Identifiers
- IUPAC name: 1-(2H-1,3-benzodioxol-5-yl)-N-(propan-2-yl)propan-2-amine
- CAS Number: 74698-37-6
- PubChem CID: 3057996
- ChemSpider: 2319184
- UNII: 307EH7224K
- CompTox Dashboard (EPA): DTXSID40388899

Chemical and physical data
- Formula: C_{13}H_{19}NO_{2}
- Molar mass: 221.300 g·mol^{−1}
- 3D model (JSmol): Interactive image
- SMILES: C1=C2C(=CC=C1CC(C)NC(C)C)OCO2
- InChI: InChI=1S/C13H19NO2/c1-9(2)14-10(3)6-11-4-5-12-13(7-11)16-8-15-12/h4-5,7,9-10,14H,6,8H2,1-3H3; Key:XKEVWMVUIDDRMC-UHFFFAOYSA-N

MDIP, also known as 3,4-methylenedioxy-N-isopropylamphetamine or as N-isopropyl-MDA, is a psychoactive drug of the phenethylamine and amphetamine families. It is the N-isopropyl analogue of 3,4-methylenedioxyamphetamine (MDA).

== Use and effects ==
In his book PiHKAL (Phenethylamines I Have Known and Loved), Alexander Shulgin lists MDIP's dose as greater than 250 mg orally and its duration as unknown. MDIP produces a brief mild threshold and no other effects.

== Chemistry ==
=== Synthesis ===
The chemical synthesis of MDIP has been described.

== See also ==
- Substituted methylenedioxyphenethylamine
