= 1,3-Benzodioxolyl-N-methylpentanamine =

MBDP

Clinical data
- Other names: 1,3-Benzodioxolyl-N-methylpentanamine; N-Methyl-1,3-benzodioxolylpentanamine; MBDP; 3,4-Methylenedioxy-α-propyl-N-methylphenethylamine; Methyl-K; UWA-091; UWA091
- Routes of administration: Oral
- ATC code: None

Pharmacokinetic data
- Duration of action: Unknown

Identifiers
- IUPAC name: 1-(2H-1,3-benzodioxol-5-yl)-N-methylpentan-2-amine
- CAS Number: 952016-78-3
- PubChem CID: 17757316
- ChemSpider: 21106348
- UNII: 4D904VI4GR
- CompTox Dashboard (EPA): DTXSID60590851

Chemical and physical data
- Formula: C_{13}H_{19}NO_{2}
- Molar mass: 221.300 g·mol^{−1}
- 3D model (JSmol): Interactive image
- SMILES: C1=C2C(=CC=C1CC(NC)CCC)OCO2
- InChI: InChI=1S/C13H19NO2/c1-3-4-11(14-2)7-10-5-6-12-13(8-10)16-9-15-12/h5-6,8,11,14H,3-4,7,9H2,1-2H3; Key:PZVRSDBLMSXDCX-UHFFFAOYSA-N

MBDP, also known as N-methyl-1,3-benzodioxolylpentanamine, 3,4-methylenedioxy-α-propyl-N-methylphenethylamine, methyl-K, or UWA-091, is a psychoactive drug of the phenethylamine, phenylisobutylamine, and MDxx families. It is the N-methyl analogue of BDP (K).

== Use and effects ==
In his book PiHKAL (Phenethylamines I Have Known and Loved), Alexander Shulgin lists MBDP's minimum dose as 100 mg orally and its duration as unknown. The drug produced no effects at tested doses.

== Chemistry ==
=== Synthesis ===
The chemical synthesis of MBDP has been described.

== Society and culture ==
=== Legal status ===
==== United Kingdom ====
This substance is a Class A drug in the Drugs controlled by the UK Misuse of Drugs Act.

== See also ==
- Substituted methylenedioxyphenethylamine
- Pentylone (bk-MBDP)
- Ethylbenzodioxolylpentanamine (EBDP; Ethyl-K)
- Methylbenzodioxolylbutanamine (MBDB; Methyl-J)
- Methylenedioxyphenylpropylaminopentane (MPAP)
- UWA-101 (α-cyclopropyl-MDPEA)
