= Dibutylone =

Names
- Systematic IUPAC name 1-(Benzo[d][1,3]dioxol-5-yl)-2-(dimethylamino)butan-1-one
- Other names 1-(1,3-Benzodioxol-5-yl)-2-(dimethylamino)butan-1-one; β-Keto-dimethylbenzodioxolylbutanamine; bk-DMBDB

Identifiers
CAS Number	802286-83-5; 17763-12-1 (HCl)
3D model (JSmol)	Interactive image
ChemSpider	52084597
PubChem CID	71308182
UNII	3ZLY5MSD6N; 75DNR1UL8R (HCl)
CompTox Dashboard (EPA)	DTXSID201016921
- InChI: InChI=1S/C13H17NO3/c1-4-10(14(2)3)13(15)9-5-6-11-12(7-9)17-8-16-11/h5-7,10H,4,8H2,1-3H3 Key: USEBIPUIVPERGC-UHFFFAOYSA-N
- SMILES: CCC(C(=O)c1ccc2c(c1)OCO2)N(C)C

Properties
Chemical formula	C_{13}H_{17}NO_{3}
Molar mass	235.283 g·mol^{−1}

Pharmacology
Legal status	BR: Class F2 (Prohibited psychotropics); US: Schedule I
- Except where otherwise noted, data are given for materials in their standard state (at 25 °C [77 °F], 100 kPa). Infobox references

Dibutylone (bk-DMBDB) is a stimulant drug of the amphetamine, phenethylamine, cathinone, and phenylisobutylamine families. It is structurally related to butylone, a designer drug that has been detected in products marketed as bath salts or plant food.

In 2018, dibutylone was the third most common drug of the cathinone class to be identified in Drug Enforcement Administration seizures.

== Legal status ==
In United States, dibutylone is on the list of Schedule I Controlled Substances as a positional isomer of pentylone.

== See also ==
- Substituted methylenedioxyphenethylamine
