= MMDA-3a =

Clinical data
- Other names: 2-Methoxy-3,4-methylenedioxyamphetamine; 2-Methoxy-MDA; 2-MeO-MDA
- Routes of administration: Oral
- Drug class: Serotonergic psychedelic; Hallucinogen
- ATC code: None

Pharmacokinetic data
- Duration of action: 10–16 hours

Identifiers
- IUPAC name: 1-(4-methoxy-1,3-benzodioxol-5-yl)propan-2-amine
- CAS Number: 23693-19-8
- PubChem CID: 90967
- ChemSpider: 82148
- UNII: NY37N4M4KW
- ChEMBL: ChEMBL127603
- CompTox Dashboard (EPA): DTXSID60946495

Chemical and physical data
- Formula: C_{11}H_{15}NO_{3}
- Molar mass: 209.245 g·mol^{−1}
- 3D model (JSmol): Interactive image
- SMILES: CC(CC1=C(C2=C(C=C1)OCO2)OC)N
- InChI: InChI=1S/C11H15NO3/c1-7(12)5-8-3-4-9-11(10(8)13-2)15-6-14-9/h3-4,7H,5-6,12H2,1-2H3; Key:OSJXZWMDUMAITM-UHFFFAOYSA-N

MMDA-3a, also known as 2-methoxy-3,4-methylenedioxyamphetamine or as 2-methoxy-MDA, is a psychedelic drug of the amphetamine family. It is the 2-methoxy derivative of 3,4-methylenedioxyamphetamine (MDA). The drug produces hallucinogenic effects in humans. Its dose is listed as 20 to 80 mg orally and its duration as 10 to 16 hours in Alexander Shulgin's book PiHKAL (Phenethylamines I Have Known and Loved). A higher dose of 100 mg was also reportedly explored and doses of 80 to 100 mg were said to be very similar to 100 μg LSD. The chemical synthesis of MMDA-3a has been described. MMDA-3a is a positional isomer of MMDA and hence is a Schedule I controlled substance in the United States. It is also a controlled substance in Canada under phenethylamine blanket-ban language.

== See also ==
- Substituted methylenedioxyphenethylamine
- Methoxymethylenedioxyamphetamine (MMDA)
- MMDA-1
- MMDA-2
- DMMDA
- DMMDA-2
- MMDA-3b
