= Pentylone =

Stimulant drug of the substituted cathinone class

Clinical data
- Other names: β-Keto-Methylbenzodioxolylpentanamine, βk-Methyl-K, βk-MBDP, methylenedioxypentedrone, 1‐(3,4‐methylenedioxyphenyl)‐2‐(methylamino)pentan‐1‐one
- ATC code: None

Legal status
- Legal status: BR: Class F2 (Prohibited psychotropics); DE: Anlage I (Authorized scientific use only); UK: Class B; US: Schedule I; Illegal in Sweden and Finland

Identifiers
- IUPAC name: (±)-1-(1,3-benzodioxol-5-yl)-2-(methylamino)pentan-1-one
- CAS Number: 698963-77-8 17763-01-8 (hydrochloride)
- PubChem CID: 60208608
- ChemSpider: 29786041
- UNII: IGN39WGH0Q
- CompTox Dashboard (EPA): DTXSID401014183

Chemical and physical data
- Formula: C_{13}H_{17}NO_{3}
- Molar mass: 235.283 g·mol^{−1}
- 3D model (JSmol): Interactive image
- SMILES: c2cc1OCOc1cc2C(=O)C(NC)CCC
- InChI: InChI=1S/C13H17NO3/c1-3-4-10(14-2)13(15)9-5-6-11-12(7-9)17-8-16-11/h5-7,10,14H,3-4,8H2,1-2H3; Key:DFMLULIEUUXXSA-UHFFFAOYSA-N

Pentylone, also known as β-ketoN-methyl-1,3-benzodioxolylpentanamine (bk-MBDP), is a stimulant developed in the 1960s. It is a substituted cathinone that has been identified in some samples of powders sold as "NRG-1", along with varying blends of other cathinone derivatives including flephedrone, MDPBP, MDPV, and 4-MePPP. It was also found in combination with 4-MePPP being sold as "NRG-3". Reports indicate side effects include paranoia, agitation, and insomnia, with effects lasting for several days at high doses.

== Pharmacology ==
Pentylone acts as a serotonin–norepinephrine–dopamine reuptake inhibitor (SNDRI) and a serotonin releasing agent.

== Legal status ==
Pentylone is banned in Canada, Germany, Sweden, the United States, and the United Kingdom.

== See also ==
- Substituted methylenedioxyphenethylamine
- α-PVP
- Dipentylone
- Methylenedioxypyrovalerone (MDPV)
- Methyl-K
- N-Ethylpentylone
- Pentedrone
- Methylenedioxyphenylpropylaminopentane (MPAP)
