= Methoxymethylenedioxyamphetamine =

Methoxymethylenedioxyamphetamine (MMDA) may refer to:

- 3-Methoxy-4,5-methylenedioxyamphetamine (MMDA or MMDA-1; 5-methoxy-MDA)
- 2-Methoxy-4,5-methylenedioxyamphetamine (MMDA-2; 6-methoxy-MDA)
- 2-Methoxy-3,4-methylenedioxyamphetamine (MMDA-3a; 2-methoxy-MDA)
- 4-Methoxy-2,3-methylenedioxyamphetamine (MMDA-3b; 4-methoxy-ORTHO-MDA)
- 5-Methoxy-2,3-methylenedioxyamphetamine (MMDA-4; 5-methoxy-ORTHO-MDA)
- 6-Methoxy-2,3-methylenedioxyamphetamine (MMDA-5; 6-methoxy-ORTHO-MDA)

== See also ==
- Methoxymethylenedioxyphenethylamine
- Dimethoxymethylenedioxyamphetamine
- EMDA-2 (6-ethoxy-MDA)
