= MMDA-2 =

Psychedelic drug

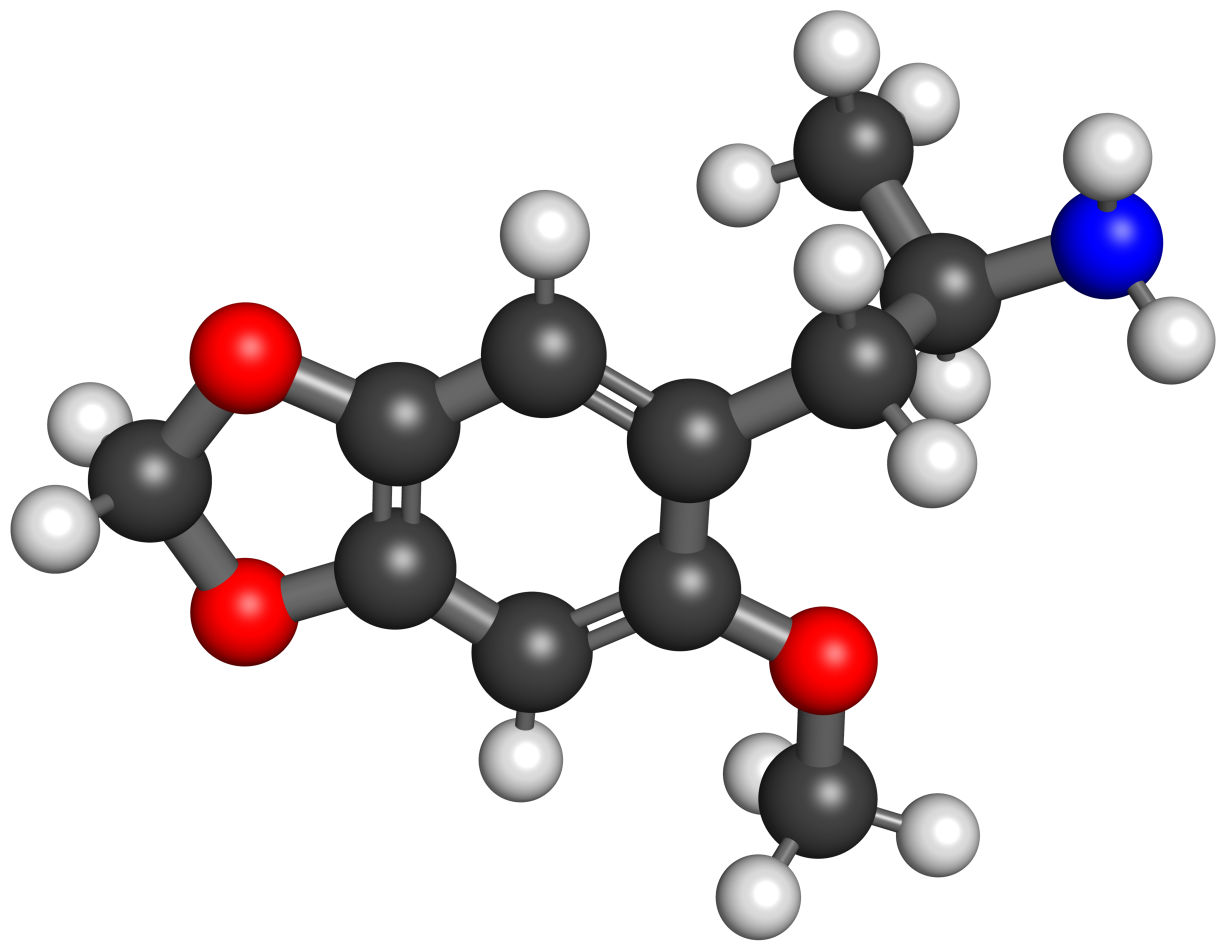

Clinical data
- Other names: 2-Methoxy-4,5-methylenedioxyamphetamine; 6-Methoxy-3,4-methylenedioxyamphetamine; 6-Methoxy-MDA; 6-MeO-MDA
- Routes of administration: Oral
- Drug class: Serotonin 5-HT_{2} receptor agonist; Serotonergic psychedelic; Hallucinogen
- ATC code: None

Legal status
- Legal status: CA: Schedule I; DE: NpSG (Industrial and scientific use only); UK: Class A; Uncontrolled (but may be covered under the Federal Analogue Act in the United States and under similar bills in other countries)

Pharmacokinetic data
- Duration of action: 8–12 hours

Identifiers
- IUPAC name: 1-(6-methoxy-1,3-benzodioxol-5-yl)propan-2-amine
- CAS Number: 23693-18-7
- PubChem CID: 90966
- ChemSpider: 82147
- UNII: TG0B6ER184
- CompTox Dashboard (EPA): DTXSID20903968

Chemical and physical data
- Formula: C_{11}H_{15}NO_{3}
- Molar mass: 209.245 g·mol^{−1}
- 3D model (JSmol): Interactive image
- SMILES: O1c2cc(c(OC)cc2OC1)CC(N)C

MMDA-2, also known as 2-methoxy-4,5-methylenedioxyamphetamine or as 6-methoxy-MDA, is a psychedelic drug of the phenethylamine, amphetamine, and MDxx families. It is the 6-methoxy derivative of MDA and is a positional isomer of MMDA (5-methoxy-MDA).

== Use and effects ==
In his book PiHKAL (Phenethylamines I Have Known and Loved), Alexander Shulgin lists MMDA-2's dose as 25 to 50 mg orally and its duration as 8 to 12 hours. The effects of MMDA-2 have been reported to include enhanced awareness, empathy, and visual facilitation and distortion, as well as some side effects like gastrointestinal upset and appetite loss. Shulgin states that MMDA-2 at a dose of 30 mg orally is very similar to MDA at a dose of 80 mg orally, and also remarks that it would be impossible for anyone to have a bad experience on the drug at that dose. MMDA-2 is approximately 4- or 5-fold more potent than MMDA, which has a listed dose range of 100 to 250 mg orally.

== Pharmacology ==
=== Pharmacodynamics ===
MMDA-2 is a moderately potent serotonin receptor agonist in the rat stomach fundus assay (A_{2} = 224 nM). These serotonin receptors may correspond specifically to the serotonin 5-HT_{2B} receptor.

It has been found that MMDA-2, unlike MMDA but similarly to 6-methyl-MDA, is very weak or negligible at inducing the release of serotonin or dopamine in vitro. Accordingly, it does not produce amphetamine-like responses in animals in drug discrimination studies. Instead, MMDA-2 is likely to act as a pure serotonin 5-HT_{2} receptor agonist similarly to the DOx series of compounds, with activation of the serotonin 5-HT_{2A} receptor believed to be responsible for its psychedelic effects.

== Chemistry ==
=== Synthesis ===
The chemical synthesis of MMDA-2 has been described.

=== Analogues ===
Analogues of MMDA-2 include 2C-MMDA-2 (MMDPEA-2; 6-methoxy-MDPEA), MDA, MMDA (5-methoxy-MDA), MMDA-3a (2-methoxy-MDA), DMMDA-2 (5,6-dimethoxy-MDA; 5-methoxy-MMDA-2), methyl-MMDA-2 (N-methyl-MMDA-2; 6-methoxy-MDMA), EMDA-2 (6-ethoxy-MDA; 6-ethoxy-MMDA-2), 2C2-NBOMe (2C-MMDA-2-NBOMe; NBOMe-MMDPEA-2), F (5-methoxy-6-APDB), 4T-MMDA-2 (4-thio-MMDA-2), 6-methyl-MDA, 6-bromo-MDA (2-Br-4,5-MDA), and 6-chloro-MDA (2-Cl-4,5-MDA), among others.

== History ==
MMDA-2 was first described in the scientific literature by Alexander Shulgin in 1964. Subsequently, it was described in greater detail by Shulgin in his book PiHKAL (Phenethylamines I Have Known and Loved) in 1991. MMDA-2 was encountered as a novel designer drug by the 1990s.

== Society and culture ==
=== Legal status ===
==== Canada ====
MMDA-2 may be a controlled substance in Canada under phenethylamine blanket-ban language.

==== United States ====
MMDA-2 is not an explicitly controlled substance in the United States, but may be considered scheduled as an isomer of MMDA.

== See also ==
- Substituted methylenedioxyphenethylamine
- Substituted methoxyphenethylamine
- Methoxymethylenedioxyamphetamine
