= The Shulgin Index =

Book about phenethylamines

The Shulgin Index, Volume One
- Author: Alexander Shulgin, Tania Manning, and Paul F. Daley
- Language: English
- Subject: Pharmacology; Chemistry; Psychoactive drugs; Phenethylamines; Psychedelics
- Publisher: Transform Press
- Publication date: 2011
- Publication place: United States
- Media type: Hardcover
- Pages: 811
- ISBN: 978-0963009630
- OCLC: 709667010
- Text: The Shulgin Index, Volume One at Internet Archive
- Website: https://transformpress.com/publications/

The Shulgin Index, Volume One: Psychedelic Phenethylamines and Related Compounds is a 2011 book written by Alexander Shulgin, Tania Manning, and Paul F. Daley and published by Transform Press. It is about psychedelic substituted phenethylamines and related compounds and their chemistry and pharmacology. The book discusses 126 main compounds from this family as well as 1,300 compounds discussed in total. It followed the earlier books PiHKAL: A Chemical Love Story (1991) and TiHKAL: The Continuation (1997) by Shulgin and his wife Ann Shulgin.

A second volume on substituted tryptamines was being prepared but was never completed due to Shulgin's death in 2014. According to the Multidisciplinary Association for Psychedelic Studies (MAPS) in 2014, the second volume would be finished in the "near future", but there have been no updates since.

== Compounds listed ==
#	Name	Chemical Name	Link
1	AEM (α-ethylmescaline)	α-Ethyl-1-(3,4,5-trimethoxyphenyl)ethylamine	
2	AL (allylescaline)	4-Allyloxy-3,5-dimethoxyphenethylamine	
3	ALEPH (DOT, para-DOT)	2,5-Dimethoxy-4-methylthioamphetamine	
4	ALEPH-2	2,5-Dimethoxy-4-ethylthioamphetamine	
5	ALEPH-4	2,5-Dimethoxy-4-(i)-propylthioamphetamine	
6	ALEPH-7	2,5-Dimethoxy-4-propylthioamphetamine	
7	ARIADNE (4C-D; Dimoxamine)	2,5-Dimethoxy-4-methyl-α-ethylphenethylamine	
8	ASB (asymbescaline)	3,4-Diethoxy-5-methoxyphenethylamine	
9	BDB (J)	α-Ethyl-3,4-methylenedioxyphenethylamine	
10	B-DFLY (Bromo-DragonFLY, DOB-Dragonfly)	1-(8-Bromobenzo[1,2-b;4,5-b']difuran-4-yl)-2-aminopropane	
11	BEATRICE (N-methyl-DOM)	2,5-Dimethoxy-N,4-dimethylamphetamine	
12	B-FLY (DOB-FLY)	1-(8-Bromo-2,3,6,7-tetrahydrobenzo[1,2-b:4,5-b']difuran-4-yl)-2-aminopropane	
13	BOB (β-methoxy-2C-B)	4-Bromo-β,2,5-trimethoxyphenethylamine	
14	BOD (β-methoxy-2C-D)	4-Methyl-2,5,β-trimethoxyphenethylamine	
15	BOH (β-methoxy-MDPEA)	β-Methoxy-3,4-methylenedioxyphenethylamine	
16	BOM (β-methoxymescaline)	β,3,4,5-Tetramethoxyphenethylamine	
17	B-SF (bromo-semi-fly)	1-(7-Bromo-5-methoxy-2,3-dihydrobenzofuran-4-yl)-2-aminopropane	
18	2C-B	2,5-Dimethoxy-4-bromophenethylamine	
19	2C-C	2,5-Dimethoxy-4-chlorophenethylamine	
20	2C-D	2,5-Dimethoxy-4-methylphenethylamine	
21	2C-E	2,5-Dimethoxy-4-ethylphenethylamine	
22	2C-H (2,5-DMPEA)	2,5-Dimethoxyphenethylamine	
23	2C-I	2,5-Dimethoxy-4-iodophenethylamine	
24	mCPP	1-(3-Chlorophenyl)piperazine	
25	2C-T	2,5-Dimethoxy-4-methylthiophenethylamine	
26	2C-T-2	2,5-Dimethoxy-4-ethy lthiophenethylamine	
27	2C-T-7	2,5-Dimethoxy-4-(n)-propylthiophenethylamine	
28	2C-TFM	2,5-Dimethoxy-4-trifluoromethylphenethylamine	
29	DESMETHYL (4-desmethylmescaline)	3,5-Dimethoxy-4-hydroxyphenethylamine	
30	3-DESMETHYL (3-desmethylmescaline)	3,4-Dimethoxy-5-hydroxyphenethylamine	
31	DESOXY (4-desoxymescaline)	3,5-Dimethoxy-4-methylphenethylamine	
32	DFLY (DragonFLY, H-DFLY)	1-(Benzo[1,2-b:4,5-b']difuran-4-yl)-2-aminopropane	
33	DHA (3,4-DHA; α-methyldopamine)	3,4-Dihydroxyamphetamine	
34	2,3-DMA	2,3-Dimethoxyamphetamine	
35	2,4-DMA	2,4-Dimethoxyamphetamine	
36	2,5-DMA (DOH)	2,5-Dimethoxyamphetamine	
37	2,6-DMA	2,6-Dimethoxyamphetamine	
38	DMA (3,4-DMA)	3,4-Dimethoxyamphetamine	
39	3,5-DMA	3,5-Dimethoxyamphetamine	
40	DMAP (metamfepramone, dimethylpropion)	2-Dimethylaminopropiophenone	
41	DMCPA	4-Methyl-2,5-dimethoxycyclopropylamine	
42	DMeA (3,4-DMeA; xylopropamine)	3,4-Dimethylamphetamine	
43	DMePEA (3,4-DMePEA)	3,4-Dimethylphenethylamine	
44	DMMDA (2,5-dimethoxy-MDA)	2,5-Dimethoxy-3,4-methylenedioxyamphetamine	
45	α,N-DMMDBA (MDM1EA)	α,N-Dimethyl-3,4-methylenedioxybenzylamine	
46	2,3-DMPEA	2,3-Dimethoxyphenethylamine	
47	2,4-DMPEA	2,4-Dimethoxyphenethylamine	
48	2,6-DMPEA	2,6-Dimethoxyphenethylamine	
49	DMPEA (3,4-DMPEA)	3,4-Dimethoxyphenethylamine	
50	3,5-DMPEA	3,5-Dimethoxyphenethylamine	
51	DOAM	2,5-Dimethoxy-4-amylamphetamine	
52	DOB	2,5-Dimethoxy-4-bromoamphetamine	
53	DOBU	2,5-Dimethoxy-4-butylamphetamine	
54	DOC	2,5-Dimethoxy-4-chloroamphetamine	
55	DOCN	2,5-Dimethoxy-4-cyanoamphetamine	
56	DOET	2,5-Dimethoxy-4-ethylamphetamine	
57	DOF	2,5-Dimethoxy-4-fluoroamphetamine	
58	DOI	2,5-Dimethoxy-4-iodoamphetamine	
59	DOIP	2,5-Dimethoxy-4-isopropylamphetamine	
60	DOM	2,5-Dimethoxy-4-methylamphetamine	
61	DON	2,5-Dimethoxy-4-nitroamphetamine	
62	DOPR	2,5-Dimethoxy-4-propylamphetamine	
63	DOTFM	2,5-Dimethoxy-4-trifluoromethylamphetamine	
64	Escaline (E)	3,5-Dimethoxy-4-ethoxyphenethylamine	
65	EDA	3,4-Ethylenedioxyamphetamine	
66	F	1-(5-Methoxy-2,3-dihydrobenzofuran-6-yl)-2-aminopropane	
67	FEA (furylethylamine)	2-Furylethylamine	
68	FLY (DOH-FLY, H-FLY)	1-(2,3,6,7-Tetrahydrobenzo[1,2-b:4,5-b']difuran-4-yl)-2-aminopropane	
69	GEA (3-methoxytyramine)	4-Hydroxy-3-methoxyphenethylamine	
70	HMePEA (N-methyltyramine)	4-Hydroxy-N-methylphenethylamine	
71	Hordenine	N,N-Dimethyl-4-hydroxyphenethylamine	
72	IM (isomescaline)	2,3,4-Trimethoxyphenethylamine	
73	Lophophine (MMDPEA)	3-Methoxy-4,5-methylenedioxyphenethylamine	
74	2-MA (OMA)	2-Methoxyamphetamine	
75	3-MA (MMA)	3-Methoxyamphetamine	
76	MBDB (methyl-J)	α-Ethyl-N-methyl-1,3-benzodioxole-5-ethanamine	
77	MDA	3,4-Methylenedioxyamphetamine	
78	homo-MDA	1-(3,4-Methylenedioxylphenyl)-3-isobutylamine	
79	MDBP (MDBZP)	1-(3,4-Methylenedioxybenzyl)piperazine	
80	MDDMA	3,4-Methylenedioxy-N,N-dimethylamphetamine	
81	MDE (MDEA)	3,4-Methylenedioxy-N-ethylamphetamine	
82	MDMA	3,4-Methylenedioxy-N-methylamphetamine	
83	homo-MDMA	N-Methyl-1-(3,4-methylenedioxyphenyl)-3-isobutylamine	
84	MDOH	3,4-Methylenedioxy-N-hydroxyamphetamine	
85	MDPEA	3,4-Methylenedioxyphenethylamine	
86	MDPR	3,4-Methylenedioxy-N-propylamphetamine	
87	MEM	2,5-Dimethoxy-4-ethoxyamphetamine	
88	MeOPP (pMeOPP)	1-(4-Methoxyphenyl)piperazine	
89	N-MePEA	N-Methylphenethylamine	
90	MEPEA	3-Methoxy-4-ethoxyphenethylamine	
91	Mescaline (M; 3,4,5-TMPEA)	3,4,5-Trimethoxyphenethylamine	
92	METHCATH (methcathinone)	β-Keto-N-methylamphetamine	
93	Methylone (bk-MDMA)	3,4-Methylenedioxymethcathinone	
94	MHA (HMA)	3-Methoxy-4-hydroxyamphetamine	
95	M-M (N-methylmescaline)	N-Methyl-3,4,5-trimethoxyphenethylamine	
96	3,4-MMA (MMA)	3-Methoxy-4-methylamphetamine	
97	MMDA (5-methoxy-MDA)	3-Methoxy-4,5-methylenedioxyamphetamine	
98	MMDA-2 (6-methoxy-MDA)	2-Methoxy-4,5-methylenedioxyamphetamine	
99	MMDA-3a (2-methoxy-MDA)	2-Methoxy-3,4-methylenedioxyamphetamine	
100	2-MPEA	2-Methoxyphenethylamine	
101	3-MPEA	3-Methoxyphenethylamine	
102	4-MPEA	4-Methoxyphenethylamine	
103	MTA (4-MTA)	4-Methylthioamphetamine	
104	Proscaline (P)	3,5-Dimethoxy-4-propoxyphenethylamine	
105	PAT (8-OH-DPAT)	8-Hydroxy-2-(dipropylamino)tetralin	
106	PCA (4-CA)	4-Chloroamphetamine	
107	PEA (phenethylamine)	2-Phenylethylamine	
108	PeMPEA	2,3,4,5,6-Pentamethoxyphenethylamine	
109	PHA (4-HA; norpholedrine)	4-Hydroxyamphetamine	
110	PMA (4-MA)	4-Methoxyamphetamine	
111	PMeA (4-MeA)	4-Methylamphetamine	
112	PMMA (4-MMA)	4-Methoxy-N-methylamphetamine	
113	TeMA (2,3,4,5-TeMA)	2,3,4,5-Tetramethoxyamphetamine	
114	TeMPEA (2,3,4,5-TeMPEA)	2,3,4,5-Tetramethoxyphenethylamine	
115	TeMPEA-3 (2,3,5,6-TeMPEA)	2,3,5,6-Tetramethoxyphenethylamine	
116	mTFMPP (TFMPP)	1-(3-(Trifluoromethyl)phenyl)piperazine	
117	TMA (3,4,5-TMA; α-methylmescaline)	3,4,5-Trimethoxyamphetamine	
118	TMA-2 (2,4,5-TMA; DOMeO)	2,4,5-Trimethoxyamphetamine	
119	TMA-3 (2,3,4-TMA)	2,3,4-Trimethoxyamphetamine	
120	TMA-4 (2,3,5-TMA)	2,3,5-Trimethoxyamphetamine	
121	TMA-5 (2,3,6-TMA)	2,3,6-Trimethoxyamphetamine	
122	TMA-6 (2,4,6-TMA; ψ-TMA-2)	2,4,6-Trimethoxyamphetamine	
123	TMePEA (3,4,5-TMePEA)	3,4,5-Trimethylphenethylamine	
124	TMPEA-2 (2,4,5-TeMPEA)	2,4,5-Trimethoxyphenethylamine	
125	Trichocereine (N,N-dimethylmescaline)	N,N-Dimethyl-3,4,5-trimethoxyphenethylamine	
126	Tyramine (4-HPEA)	4-Hydroxyphenethylamine	

== See also ==
- Bibliography of Alexander Shulgin
- List of psychedelic literature
- PiHKAL (Phenethylamines I Have Known and Loved) (1991)
- TiHKAL (Tryptamines I Have Known and Loved) (1997)
- The Simple Plant Isoquinolines (2002)
- Phenethylamine: Von der Struktur zur Funktion (2013)
- Substituted phenethylamine (PEA)
- Substituted amphetamine (AMPH)
- Substituted methylenedioxyphenethylamine (MDxx)
- Substituted methoxyphenethylamine
- 2C, DOx, 4C, scaline, 3C, Ψ-PEA, 25-NB, FLY
