= C10H15NO2 =

The molecular formula C_{10}H_{15}NO_{2} (molar mass : 181.23 g/mol, exact mass : 181.110279) may refer to:

- 2C-H
- 2,5-DDM-DOM
- N,N-Dimethyldopamine
- 3,4-Dihydroxymethamphetamine
- Dimethoxyphenethylamines
  - 2,3-Dimethoxyphenethylamine
  - 2,4-Dimethoxyphenethylamine
  - 2,5-Dimethoxyphenethylamine
  - 2,6-Dimethoxyphenethylamine
  - 3,4-Dimethoxyphenethylamine
  - 3,5-Dimethoxyphenethylamine
- α-Ethyldopamine
- Etilefrine, a cardiac stimulant
- Hexapropymate, a hypnotic/sedative
- meta-Hydroxyephedrine
- 4-Hydroxy-3-methoxyamphetamine
- Methylecgonidine
- Oxilofrin
- H77/77
