= C11H17NO2 =

The molecular formula C_{11}H_{17}NO_{2} (molar mass : 195.258 g/mol) may refer to:

- 2C-D
- 2-DM-DOM
- 5-DM-DOM
- DESOXY
- Deterenol
- Dimethoxyamphetamines
  - 2,4-Dimethoxyamphetamine
  - 2,5-Dimethoxyamphetamine
  - 3,4-Dimethoxyamphetamine
  - 3,5-Dimethoxyamphetamine
- 4-Hydroxy-3-methoxymethamphetamine
- Metaterol
- 3-Methoxy-4-ethoxyphenethylamine
