= C9H13NO =

The molecular formula C_{9}H_{13}NO (molar mass : 151.20 g/mol, exact mass : 151.099714) may refer to:

- Cathine
- Gepefrine
- Halostachine
- 4-Hydroxyamphetamine
- N-Hydroxyamphetamine
- N-Methyltyramine
- L-Norpseudoephedrine
- Phenylalaninol
- Phenylpropanolamine, a psychoactive drug
- Methoxyphenethylamine
  - 2-Methoxyphenethylamine
  - 3-Methoxyphenethylamine
  - 4-Methoxyphenethylamine
