= DMPEA =

DMPEA can refer to two subclasses of substituted phenethylamines:

Dimethoxy-phenethylamines

- 2,3-Dimethoxyphenethylamine
- 2,4-Dimethoxyphenethylamine
- 2,5-Dimethoxyphenethylamine
- 2,6-Dimethoxyphenethylamine
- 3,4-Dimethoxyphenethylamine (homoveratrylamine)
- 3,5-Dimethoxyphenethylamine

Dimethyl-phenethylamines

- α,α-Dimethylphenethylamine (Phentermine)
- N,α-Dimethylphenethylamine (Methamphetamine)
- 2,α-Dimethylphenethylamine (Ortetamine)
- 3,α-Dimethylphenethylamine
- 4,α-Dimethylphenethylamine
- N,N-Dimethylphenethylamine
