= C13H21NO4 =

The molecular formula C_{13}H_{21}NO_{4} (molar mass: 255.314 g/mol) may refer to:

- Meteloidine
- Tetramethoxyamphetamine
  - 2,3,4,5-Tetramethoxyamphetamine
  - 2,3,4,6-Tetramethoxyamphetamine
  - 2,3,5,6-Tetramethoxyamphetamine
