= 3,4-Dimethoxyamphetamine =

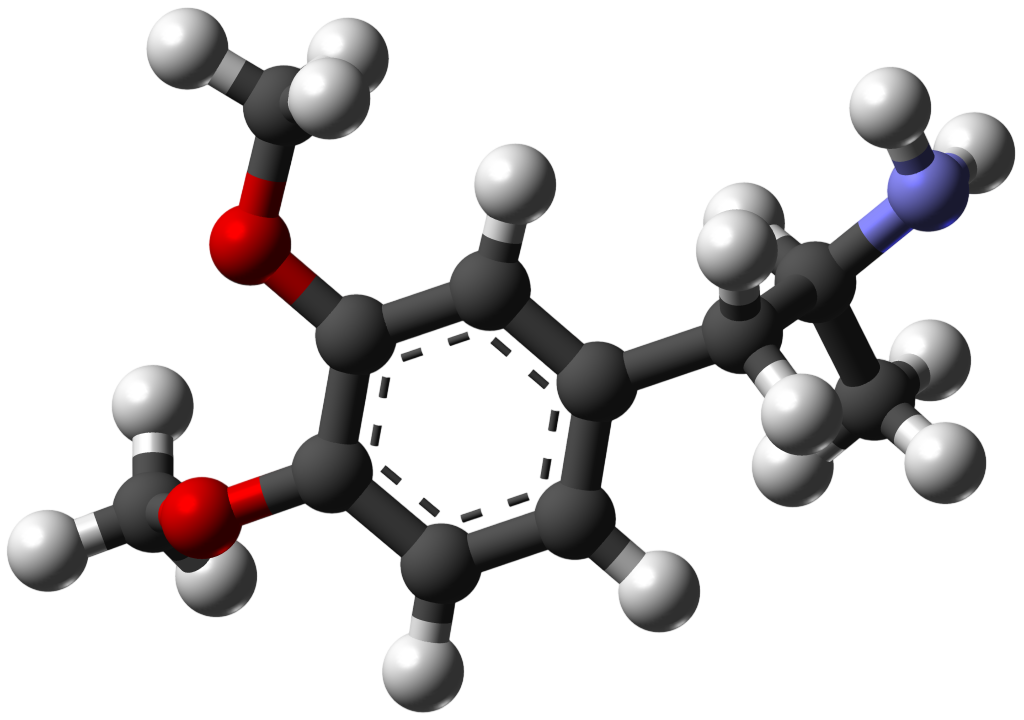

Clinical data
- Other names: 3,4-DMA; Dimethoxyamphetamine; DMA; 3,4-Dimethoxy-α-methylphenethylamine; O,O-Dimethyl-α-methyldopamine; α-Methylhomoveratrylamine; EA-1316; NSC-144717
- Routes of administration: Oral, intravenous injection
- Drug class: Serotonergic psychedelic; Hallucinogen; Sympathomimetic
- ATC code: None

Pharmacokinetic data
- Duration of action: Unknown

Identifiers
- IUPAC name: 1-(3,4-dimethoxyphenyl)propan-2-amine
- CAS Number: 120-26-3
- PubChem CID: 8423
- ChemSpider: 8116
- UNII: EMH5PUB78V
- ChEMBL: ChEMBL277540
- CompTox Dashboard (EPA): DTXSID50902787
- ECHA InfoCard: 100.003.985

Chemical and physical data
- Formula: C_{11}H_{17}NO_{2}
- Molar mass: 195.262 g·mol^{−1}
- 3D model (JSmol): Interactive image
- SMILES: CC(CC1=CC(=C(C=C1)OC)OC)N
- InChI: InChI=1S/C11H17NO2/c1-8(12)6-9-4-5-10(13-2)11(7-9)14-3/h4-5,7-8H,6,12H2,1-3H3; Key:KAZPHAGSWZTKDW-UHFFFAOYSA-N

3,4-Dimethoxyamphetamine (3,4-DMA), or simply dimethoxyamphetamine (DMA), is a psychedelic drug of the phenethylamine and amphetamine families. It is one of the dimethoxyamphetamine (DMA) series of positional isomers. The drug is also an analogue of other psychedelics like 3,4-methylenedioxyamphetamine (MDA), 3,4,5-trimethoxyamphetamine (TMA), and mescaline (3,4,5-trimethoxyphenethylamine). It has been reported to produce psychedelic effects in humans but only entactogen-like effects without stimulant- or psychedelic-like effects in animals.

== Use and effects ==
In his book PiHKAL (Phenethylamines I Have Known and Loved) and other publications, Alexander Shulgin lists 3,4-DMA's dose as "a few hundred milligrams" (route unspecified) and its duration as unknown. A dose of approximately 70 mg intravenously produced insignificant to slight psychoactive effects in two individuals. Conversely, a subsequent approximate 700 mg dose intravenously in the same two people produced a definite mescaline-like state, including visual hallucinations (e.g., geometric figures and occasional structured forms), visual distortions, after-images, feelings of unreality, paranoia, marked pupil dilation, and gross body tremors.

Gordon Alles reported 3,4-DMA to be inactive at doses of 10 to 120 mg orally but active at 160 mg orally, with reported effects including increased blood pressure, slight pupil dilation, lacrimation, and gastrointestinal uneasiness. He estimated that the response at this dose was equivalent to that of about 60 to 80 mg 3,4-methylenedioxyamphetamine (MDA), suggesting that 3,4-DMA's potency may be about 2- to 3-fold lower than that of MDA and may fall midway between that of MDA and mescaline. Alternatively, according to Shulgin, 3,4-DMA may have comparable potency to mescaline, with an effective dose of perhaps 300 to 400 mg orally, or may be less potent than mescaline. Richard Glennon suggested that the dose may be 400 to 700 mg orally.

== Pharmacology ==
=== Pharmacodynamics ===
3,4-DMA has been assessed in various biochemical and preclinical studies. Its affinity (K_{i}) for the rat serotonin 5-HT_{2A} receptor has been assessed and was found to be 43,300 nM. For comparison, the affinity of para-methoxyamphetamine (PMA) was 33,600 nM, of 2,5-dimethoxyamphetamine (2,5-DMA) was 5,200 nM, and of 2,5-dimethoxy-4-methylamphetamine (DOM) was 100 nM in the same study. 3,4-DMA also showed affinity for the 5-HT_{1} receptor (K_{i} = 64,600 nM). The drug has additionally been found to be a monoamine oxidase inhibitor (MAOI), with an IC_{50} of 20,000 nM for monoamine oxidase A (MAO-A), whereas it was inactive at monoamine oxidase B (MAO-B) (IC_{50} > 100,000 nM).

3,4-DMA does not produce hyperlocomotion and hence lacks stimulant-like effects in rodents. It also fails to produce stimulus generalization to dextroamphetamine in rodent drug discrimination tests, likewise suggesting that it lacks stimulant- or amphetamine-like effects. The drug partially but incompletely substituted for DOM in rodents, suggesting that it may lack psychedelic-like effects. 3,4-DMA partially to fully substituted for partially to fully substituted for PMMA, MDMA, and MDA in rodents, suggesting that it may have entactogen-like effects.

=== Pharmacokinetics ===
3,4-DMA produces 3-methoxy-4-hydroxyamphetamine (MHA) as its major metabolite in dogs and monkeys.

== Chemistry ==
=== Synthesis ===
The chemical synthesis of 3,4-DMA has been described.

=== Analogues ===
3,4-DMA is an analogue of the catecholamine neurotransmitters dopamine (3,4-dihydroxyphenethylamine), norepinephrine (noradrenaline; 3,4,β-trihydroxyphenethylamine), and epinephrine (adrenaline; 3,4,β-trihydroxy-N-methylphenethylamine). It is also an analogue of psychedelics and entactogens like mescaline (3,4,5-trimethoxyphenethylamine), 3,4,5-trimethoxyamphetamine (TMA), and 3,4-methylenedioxyamphetamine (MDA), among others. Positional isomers of 3,4-DMA include 2,3-dimethoxyamphetamine (2,3-DMA), 2,4-dimethoxyamphetamine (2,4-DMA), 2,5-dimethoxyamphetamine (2,5-DMA), 2,6-dimethoxyamphetamine (2,6-DMA), and 3,5-dimethoxyamphetamine (3,5-DMA). Other analogues of 3,4-DMA include 3,4-dimethoxyphenethylamine (DMPEA), 3-methoxyamphetamine (3-MA), 4-methoxyamphetamine (PMA), 3,4-ethylenedioxyamphetamine (EDMA), and 3,4-dihydroxyamphetamine (DHA; α-methyldopamine), among others.

== History ==
3,4-DMA was first described in the scientific literature by Gordon Alles by 1932. Its effects in humans were first described by Mahlon David Fairchild by 1963. Subsequently, the drug was described in greater detail by Alexander Shulgin in his book PiHKAL (Phenethylamines I Have Known and Loved) in 1991.

== Society and culture ==
=== Legal status ===
==== Canada ====
3,4-DMA is a controlled substance in Canada under amphetamine blanket-ban language.

==== United States ====
3,4-DMA is not an explicitly controlled substance in the United States, but can be considered a Schedule I controlled substance as a positional isomer of 2,5-dimethoxyamphetamine (2,5-DMA) in this country.

== See also ==
- Dimethoxyamphetamine
- Substituted methoxyphenethylamine
- Substituted amphetamine
