= C10H13NO2 =

The molecular formula C_{10}H_{13}NO_{2} (molar mass : 179.21 g/mol, exact mass : 179.094629) may refer to:

- ALPHA (psychedelic)
- Fusaric acid
- Homarylamine (methylenedioxymethylphenethylamine)
- MDM1EA
- 2,3-Methylenedioxyamphetamine (2,3-MDA)
- 3,4-Methylenedioxyamphetamine (MDA or 3,4-MDA)
- Phenacetin, an analgesic
- Phenibut
- Phenprobamate, a muscle relaxant
- Risocaine
- Salsolinol
- SKF-39315
- GAMMA (drug)
- N-Methylnorsalsolinol
