= 24-NB =

Class of chemical compounds

24H-NBOMe.

The 24-NB (24-NBx) series is a little-known family of serotonin receptor modulators and possible serotonergic psychedelics that are primarily substituted 2,4-dimethoxyphenethylamines or positional isomers of members of the 25-NB family. The best known representative is 24H-NBOMe, which is a potent, selective, full agonist of 5-HT_{2A} receptor, with a potency approximately equal to or even greater than 25H-NBOMe, other well-known compounds in this family also include 24H-NBF.

== Сhemistry ==
The structural formula of phenethylamine with marked substitution points.

Compounds in the 24-NBOMe series are often positional isomers of the 25-NBOMe series, in which two methoxy groups are fixed at the 2 and 4-positions of the phenyl ring of the phenylethylamine moiety; that is, the derivatives corresponding to the 24-NB series are 2,4-dimethoxyphenethylamine, although they do not belong to the 2C family (which encompasses 2,5-dimethoxy-substituted phenethylamine) due to the different arrangement of the methoxy groups. To be more specific, the compounds of the 24-NB series are N-benzyl derivatives of 2,4-dimethoxy-substituted phenethylamine, with additional substituents on both the phenethylamine moiety and the N-benzyl moiety (although the substituents are more commonly located on the N-benzyl group, usually in the 2-position).

== Pharmacology ==
=== Pharmacodynamics ===
In vitro, the 24H-NBOMe isomer exhibits high agonistic activity against 5-HT_{2A} receptors, exceeding in potency (EC_{50}= 3.88 nM) the standard 25H-NBOMe (EC_{50}=11.4 nM) and demonstrating comparable efficacy (Emax = 145%) relative to LSD. In in vivo studies in fish, 24H-NBOMe caused anxiety in fish and showed potent behavioral effects.

In vitro, 24H-NBF showed the highest activity (EC_{50}) = 158 nM) towards 5-HT_{2A}, significantly exceeding the reference 25H-NBF (EC_{50}) = 448 nM) and demonstrating a Emax (107%) similar to LSD. Virtually all compounds in this class are agents that induce fear and anxiety or suppress motor activity in zebrafish, for example 24H-NBCl (N-(2-Chlorobenzyl)-2,4-dimethoxyphenethylamine) as well as 24H-NBBr (N-(2-bromobenzyl)-2,4-dimethoxyphenethylamine) have been reported to exhibit characteristics of both a hallucinogen and an anxiety-inducing agent. In another study, zebrafish were administered the compound 24H-NBOMe(F) for 14 days; a single dose of this compound induced anxiety in the zebrafish, but with chronic exposure, it had the opposite effect, acting as an anxiolytic; it was noted that levels of monoamines, particularly norepinephrine, decreased sharply along with serotonin and dopamine.
