= Methoxyamphetamine =

Methoxyamphetamine may refer to:

- 2-Methoxyamphetamine (2-MA) or ortho-methoxyamphetamine (OMA)
- 3-Methoxyamphetamine (3-MA) or meta-methoxyamphetamine (MMA)
- 4-Methoxyamphetamine (4-MA) or para-methoxyamphetamine (PMA)

== See also ==
- Substituted methoxyphenethylamine
- Dimethoxyamphetamine
- Trimethoxyamphetamine
- Tetramethoxyamphetamine
- Pentamethoxyamphetamine
- Methoxyphenethylamine
- Dimethoxyphenethylamine
- Trimethoxyphenethylamine
- Tetramethoxyphenethylamine
- Pentamethoxyphenethylamine
