= M-ALPHA =

Stimulant drug

Clinical data
- Other names: 3,4-Methylenedioxy-α-ethyl-N-methylbenzylamine; α-Ethyl-N-methylpiperonylamine; 1-Methylamino-1-(3,4-methylenedioxyphenyl)propane
- Routes of administration: Oral
- Drug class: Unknown
- ATC code: None

Pharmacokinetic data
- Duration of action: ~6 hours

Identifiers
- IUPAC name: 1-(1,3-Benzodioxol-5-yl)-N-methylpropan-1-amine
- CAS Number: 127292-43-7 1134709-81-1 (hydrochloride)
- PubChem CID: 14647597
- ChemSpider: 37674716
- UNII: 5U214IRH62
- CompTox Dashboard (EPA): DTXSID301016936

Chemical and physical data
- Formula: C_{11}H_{15}NO_{2}
- Molar mass: 193.246 g·mol^{−1}
- 3D model (JSmol): Interactive image
- SMILES: CNC(CC)C1=CC2=C(C=C1)OCO2
- InChI: InChI=1S/C11H15NO2/c1-3-9(12-2)8-4-5-10-11(6-8)14-7-13-10/h4-6,9,12H,3,7H2,1-2H3; Key:NLINVDHEDVEOMJ-UHFFFAOYSA-N

M-ALPHA, also known as 3,4-methylenedioxy-α-ethyl-N-methylbenzylamine or as α-ethyl-N-methylpiperonylamine, is a psychoactive drug of the substituted benzylamine group. It was reported by Alexander Shulgin in his book PIHKAL as a positional isomer of MDMA. Subsequently, the drug was encountered as a designer drug in the United Kingdom in 2010 and was reported to the EMCDDA new drug monitoring service. It was described by Shulgin as similar in action to its demethylated homologue, ALPHA, but with roughly twice the duration and twice the potency. ALPHA itself was described as active at doses of 10 to 140 mg, with a duration of about 3 hours, and producing eyes-closed "dreams", some body tingling, and a pleasant positive feeling, but without any appetite suppression. M-ALPHA was encountered as a designer drug by 2010.

== See also ==
- ALPHA
- MDM1EA
- Methylenedioxybenzylpiperazine (MDBZP)
- Filenadol
- Isoethcathinone
- Methylenedioxyphencyclidine
- M-α-HMCA
- Homo-MDA
- Homo-MDMA
- UC-514321
