= C12H19NO4 =

Molecular formula

The molecular formula C_{12}H_{19}NO_{4} (molar mass : 241.287 g/mol) may refer to:

- BOM (psychedelic)
- 2,3,4,5-Tetramethoxyphenethylamine
- TeMPEA-3 (2,3,5,6-Tetramethoxyphenethylamine)
