= 24H-NBOMe =

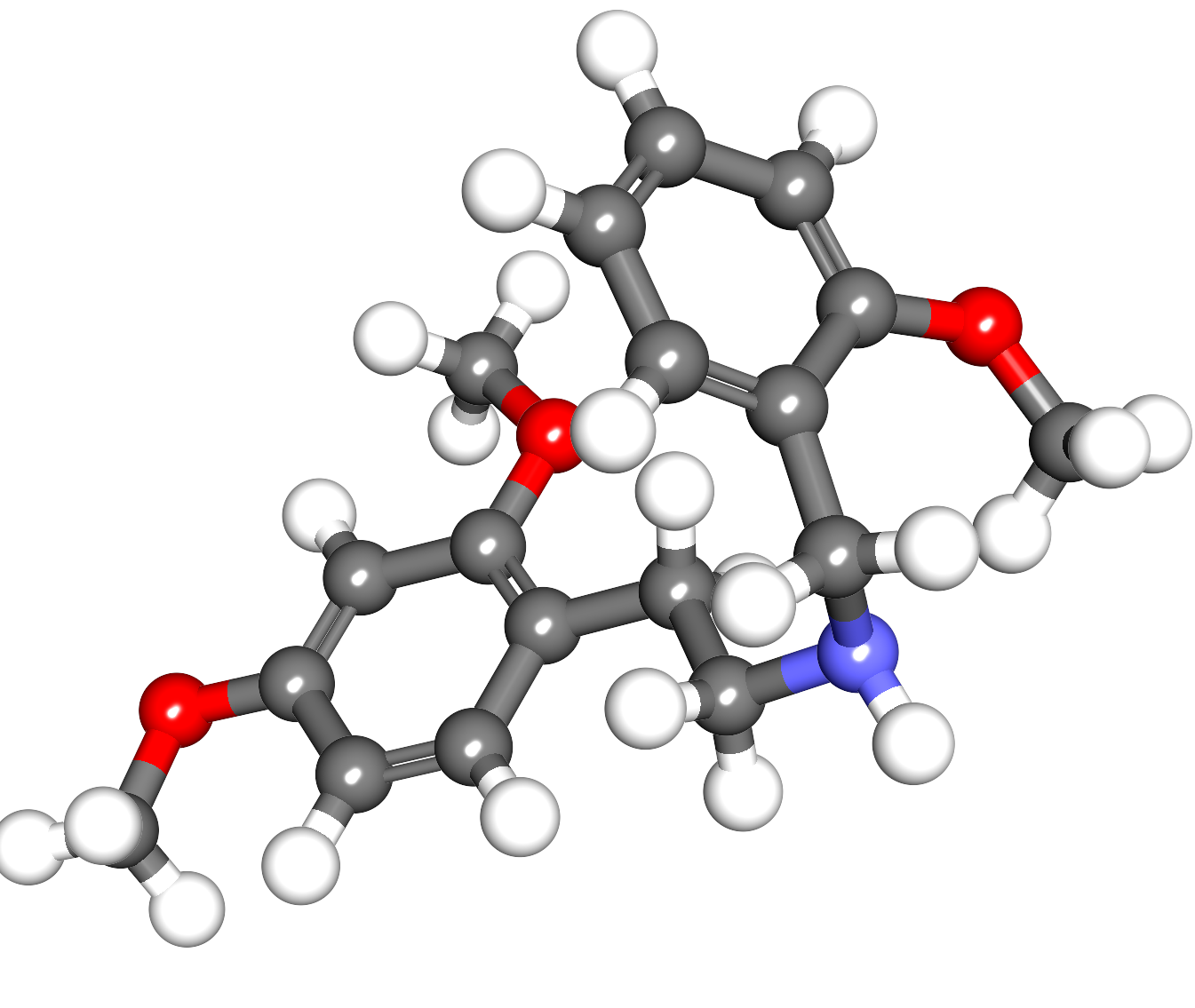

Clinical data
- Other names: N-(2-Methoxybenzyl)-2,4-dimethoxyphenethylamine; 2,4-DMPEA-NBOMe; 24-NBOMe; 24-NBMeO
- Drug class: Serotonin receptor modulator; Serotonin 5-HT_{2A} receptor agonist
- ATC code: None

Identifiers
- IUPAC name: 2-(2,4-dimethoxyphenyl)-N-[(2-methoxyphenyl)methyl]ethanamine
- PubChem CID: 86253684
- ChemSpider: 62804437

Chemical and physical data
- Formula: C_{18}H_{23}NO_{3}
- Molar mass: 301.386 g·mol^{−1}
- 3D model (JSmol): Interactive image
- SMILES: COC1=CC(=C(C=C1)CCNCC2=CC=CC=C2OC)OC
- InChI: InChI=1S/C18H23NO3/c1-20-16-9-8-14(18(12-16)22-3)10-11-19-13-15-6-4-5-7-17(15)21-2/h4-9,12,19H,10-11,13H2,1-3H3; Key:CYJMJWILHHQKGL-UHFFFAOYSA-N

24H-NBOMe, also known as N-(2-methoxybenzyl)-2,4-dimethoxyphenethylamine (2,4-DMPEA-NBOMe), is a potent serotonin receptor modulator that is a positional isomer of 25H-NBOMe, in which the methoxy groups are substituted at the 2- and 4-positions of the phenethylamine moiety. This is an N-benzyl derivative of 2,4-dimethoxyphenylethylamine. It is a representative of the 24x-NBOMe series.

== Pharmacology ==
24H-NBOMe is a potent serotonergic agent; primarily, it is a full agonist of the 5-hydroxytryptamine receptor 2A with a K_{i} value of 1.71–3.88 nM (In mice, this value was 0.68 nM.) 24H-NBOMe binds to the receptor approximately 174 times more strongly than 2,4-DMPEA.

24H-NBOMe is a substance that causes anxiety or panic and inhibits motor activity in zebrafish.

== History ==
24H-NBOMe was first described by David Earl Nichols and his colleagues.

== See also ==
- Substituted N-benzylphenethylamine
