= Dimethoxyamphetamine =

Dimethoxyamphetamine (DMA) may refer to the following:

- 3,4-Dimethoxyamphetamine (3,4-DMA; DMA-1; DMA)
- 2,3-Dimethoxyamphetamine (2,3-DMA; DMA-2)
- 2,4-Dimethoxyamphetamine (2,4-DMA; DMA-3)
- 2,5-Dimethoxyamphetamine (2,5-DMA; DMA-4; DOH)
- 2,6-Dimethoxyamphetamine (2,6-DMA; DMA-5)
- 3,5-Dimethoxyamphetamine (3,5-DMA; DMA-6)

== See also ==
- Substituted methoxyphenethylamine
- Methoxyamphetamine
- Trimethoxyamphetamine
- Tetramethoxyamphetamine
- Pentamethoxyamphetamine
- Methoxyphenethylamine
- Dimethoxyphenethylamine
- Trimethoxyphenethylamine
- Tetramethoxyphenethylamine
- Pentamethoxyphenethylamine
