= Dimethoxyphenethylamine =

Dimethoxyphenethylamine may refer to:

- 2,3-Dimethoxyphenethylamine (2,3-DMPEA; DMPEA-2)
- 2,4-Dimethoxyphenethylamine (2,4-DMPEA; DMPEA-3)
- 2,5-Dimethoxyphenethylamine (2C-H; 2,5-DMPEA; DMPEA-4)
- 2,6-Dimethoxyphenethylamine (2,6-DMPEA; DMPEA-5)
- 3,4-Dimethoxyphenethylamine (3,4-DMPEA; DMPEA; DMPEA-1)
- 3,5-Dimethoxyphenethylamine (3,5-DMPEA; DMPEA-6)

== See also ==
- Substituted methoxyphenethylamine
- Methoxyphenethylamine
- Trimethoxyphenethylamine
- Tetramethoxyphenethylamine
- Pentamethoxyphenethylamine
- Methoxyamphetamine
- Dimethoxyamphetamine
- Trimethoxyamphetamine
- Tetramethoxyamphetamine
- Pentamethoxyamphetamine
