= Methyltyramine =

Methyltyramine may refer to:

- α-Methyltyramine (4-hydroxyamphetamine)
- β-Methyltyramine
- N-Methyltyramine
- 2-Methyltyramine
- 3-Methyltyramine
- O-Methyltyramine (4-methoxyphenethylamine)
