= List of naturally occurring phenethylamines =

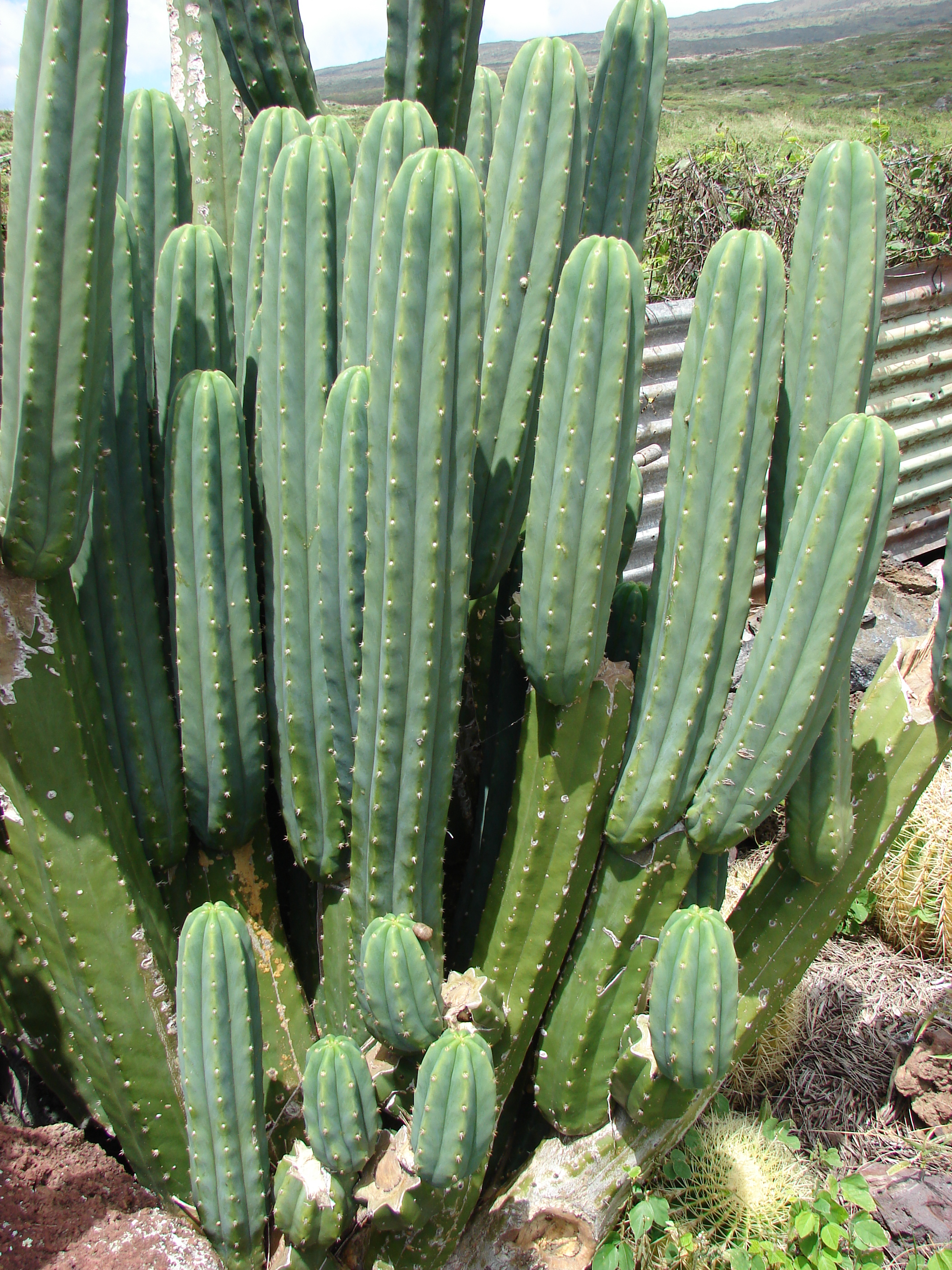
Trichocereus macrogonus var. pachanoi, syn. Echinopsis pachanoi contain several phenethylamines.

Naturally occurring phenethylamines are organic compounds which may be thought of as being derived from phenethylamine itself that are found in living organisms.

Tyramine is a phenethylamine that occurs widely in plants and animals, and is metabolized by various enzymes, including monoamine oxidases. Substituted phenethylamines like mescaline are found in psychoactive cactus, and perhaps in some Acacia or Senegalia species.

== List of phenethylamines ==
Selected phenethylamines
Short Name	Origin	R^{α}	R^{4}	R^{5}	R^{N1}	R^{N2}	Full Name
Phenethylamine	Natural	?	?	?	?	?	2-phenylethan-1-amine
Hordenine	Natural	?	?	?	?	?	N,N-Dimethyltyramine
Lophophine	Natural	?	?	?	?	?	3-methoxy-4,5-methylenedioxyphenethylamine
Mescaline	Natural	?	?	?	?	?	3,4,5-trimethoxyphenethylamine
DMPEA	Natural	?	?	?	?	?	3,4-dimethoxyphenethylamine
Tyramine	Natural	?	?	?	?	?	4-Hydroxyphenethylamine
	Natural	?	?	?	?	?	3-hydroxy-4,5-dimethoxyphenethylamine
3-MT	Natural	?	?	?	?	?	4-hydroxy-3-methoxyphenethylamine
	Natural	?	?	?	?	?	4-hydroxy-3,5-dimethoxyphenethylamine
