= Methoxyphenethylamine =

Methoxyphenethylamine, or monomethoxyphenethylamine, may refer to:

- 2-Methoxyphenethylamine (2-MPEA)
- 3-Methoxyphenethylamine (3-MPEA)
- 4-Methoxyphenethylamine (4-MPEA)

== See also ==
- Substituted methoxyphenethylamine
- Dimethoxyphenethylamine
- Trimethoxyphenethylamine
- Tetramethoxyphenethylamine
- Pentamethoxyphenethylamine
- Methoxyamphetamine
- Dimethoxyamphetamine
- Trimethoxyamphetamine
- Tetramethoxyamphetamine
- Pentamethoxyamphetamine
