= 24H-NBF =

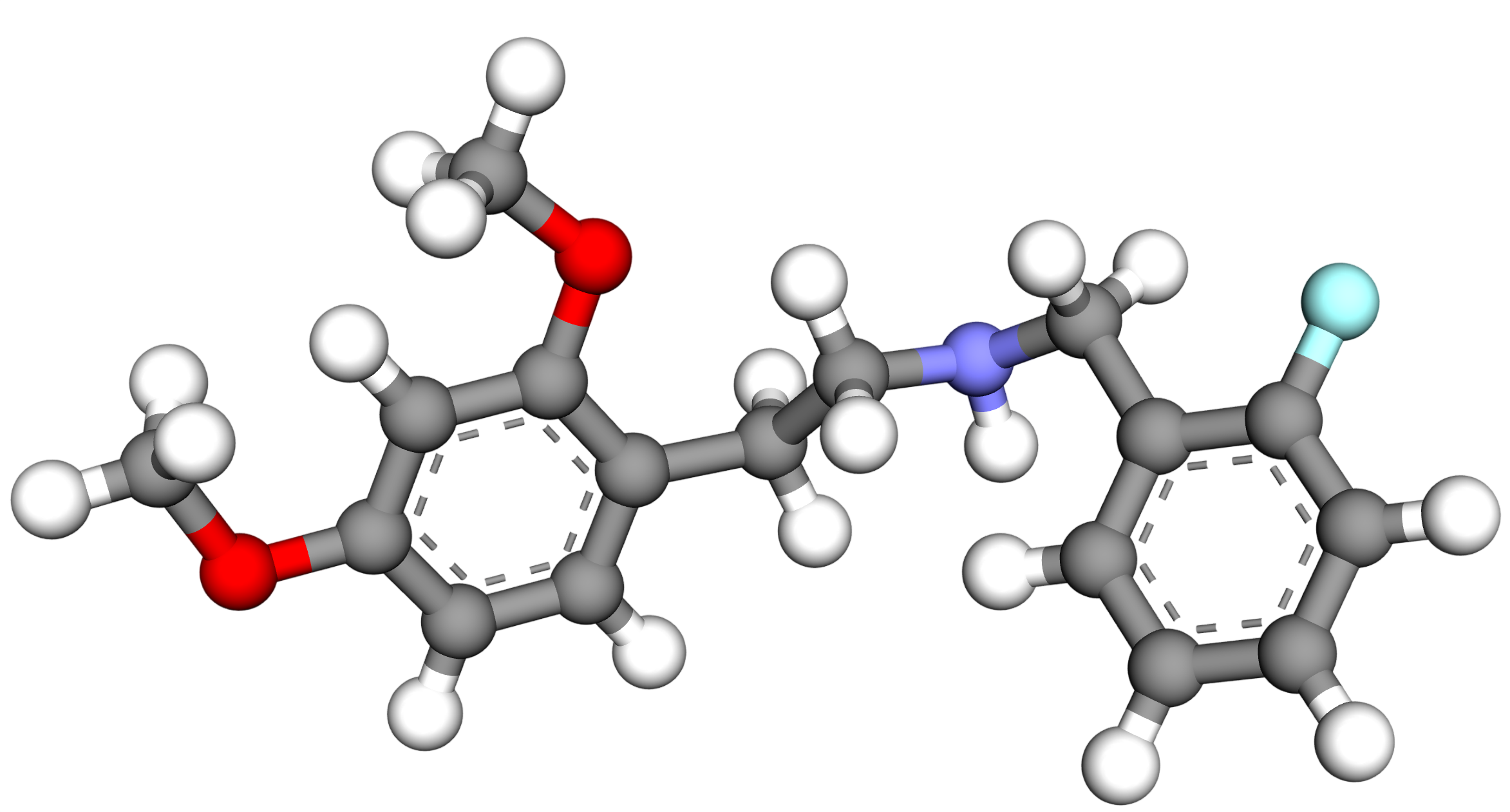

Clinical data
- Drug class: Serotonin receptor modulator; 5-HT_{2A} receptor agonist; putative psychedelic (hallucinogenic drug)
- ATC code: None

Identifiers
- IUPAC name: 2-(2,4-dimethoxyphenyl)-N-[(2-fluorophenyl)methyl]ethan-1-amine

Chemical and physical data
- Formula: C_{17}H_{20}FNO_{2}
- Molar mass: 289.350 g·mol^{−1}
- 3D model (JSmol): Interactive image
- SMILES: COc1cc(OC)ccc1CCNCc1ccccc1F
- InChI: InChI=1S/C17H20FNO2/c1-20-15-8-7-13(17(11-15)21-2)9-10-19-12-14-5-3-4-6-16(14)18/h3-8,11,19H,9-10,12H2,1-2H3; Key:JQZYDEUAIHIHLI-UHFFFAOYSA-N

24H-NBF also known as N-(2-fluorobenzyl)-2,4-dimethoxyphenethylamine (2,4-DMPEA-NBF) is a serotonin receptor modulator and a putative psychedelic from the 24-NB family; it is an N-(2-fluorobenzyl) derivative of 2,4-dimethoxyphenethylamine and is a positional isomer of many other compounds in the "NBF" class (which are N-benzyl derivatives of other methoxyphenethylamines with a fluorine substituent at the 2-position of the carbon in the N-benzyl moiety; amongst these (including compounds such as 25H-NBF), it is the most potent in terms of efficacy and binding to the serotonin 5-HT_{2A} receptor).

== Pharmacology ==
=== Pharmacodynamics ===
24H-NBF is a full agonist (E_{max} was 106–107 per cent) of the serotonin 5-HT_{2A} receptor, with an EC_{50} of 158 nM; this was measured by assessing the extent to which the receptor binds the β-arrestin 2 protein.

It was known that 24H-NBF had an anxiolytic effect, suppressing emotions and motor activity in vivo.
