= HMDA =

HMDA may refer to:

- Home Mortgage Disclosure Act
- Hyderabad Metropolitan Development Authority, an expanded urban planning agency of the city of Hyderabad, India
- Hexamethylenediamine, an industrial chemical
- Homo-MDA, an entactogen-related drug
- Hospital corpsman dental assistant
