= 2,3,4,6-Tetramethoxyamphetamine =

TeMA-2

Clinical data
- Other names: 2,3,4,6-TeMA; TeMA-2
- ATC code: None

Identifiers
- IUPAC name: 1-(2,3,4,6-tetramethoxyphenyl)propan-2-amine
- CAS Number: 23693-27-8

Chemical and physical data
- Formula: C_{13}H_{21}NO_{4}
- Molar mass: 255.314 g·mol^{−1}
- 3D model (JSmol): Interactive image
- SMILES: COc1cc(OC)c(c(c1CC(N)C)OC)OC
- InChI: InChI=1S/C13H21NO4/c1-8(14)6-9-10(15-2)7-11(16-3)13(18-5)12(9)17-4/h7-8H,6,14H2,1-5H3; Key:DJUKQNSUJQBHFW-UHFFFAOYSA-N

2,3,4,6-Tetramethoxyamphetamine (2,3,4,6-TeMA), also known as TeMA-2, is a chemical compound of the phenethylamine and amphetamine families related to the psychedelic drug mescaline (3,4,5-trimethoxyphenethylamine). It was first described in the scientific literature by Alexander Shulgin and colleagues in 1969, but had not been synthesized or assessed by them at that time. As such, the potential hallucinogenic activity of TeMA-2 is unknown. The fluorescence of TeMA-2 has been studied. TeMA-2 is said to be a virtually unexplored substance. It is a controlled substance in Canada under phenethylamine blanket-ban language.

== See also ==
- Substituted methoxyphenethylamine
- Tetramethoxyamphetamine
- Tetramethoxyphenethylamine
- 2,3,4,6-Tetramethoxyphenethylamine
