= 2,3,5,6-Tetramethoxyamphetamine =

TeMA-3

Clinical data
- Other names: 2,3,5,6-TeMA; TeMA-3
- ATC code: None

Identifiers
- IUPAC name: 1-(2,3,5,6-tetramethoxyphenyl)propan-2-amine
- CAS Number: 23693-28-9

Chemical and physical data
- Formula: C_{13}H_{21}NO_{4}
- Molar mass: 255.314 g·mol^{−1}
- 3D model (JSmol): Interactive image
- SMILES: COc1cc(OC)c(c(c1OC)CC(N)C)OC
- InChI: InChI=1S/C13H21NO4/c1-8(14)6-9-12(17-4)10(15-2)7-11(16-3)13(9)18-5/h7-8H,6,14H2,1-5H3; Key:UMWIVVHAMHPTBF-UHFFFAOYSA-N

2,3,5,6-Tetramethoxyamphetamine (2,3,5,6-TeMA), also known as TeMA-3, is a chemical compound of the phenethylamine and amphetamine families related to the psychedelic drug mescaline (3,4,5-trimethoxyphenethylamine). It was first described in the scientific literature by Alexander Shulgin and colleagues in 1969, but had not been synthesized or assessed by them at that time. The fluorescence of TeMA-3 has been studied. Very little appears to be known about TeMA-3. It is a controlled substance in Canada under phenethylamine blanket-ban language.

== See also ==
- Substituted methoxyphenethylamine
- Tetramethoxyamphetamine
- Tetramethoxyphenethylamine
- 2,3,5,6-Tetramethoxyphenethylamine
