= Tetramethoxyamphetamine =

Tetramethoxyamphetamine (TeMA) may refer to:

- 2,3,4,5-Tetramethoxyamphetamine (TeMA or TeMA-1)
- 2,3,4,6-Tetramethoxyamphetamine (TeMA-2)
- 2,3,5,6-Tetramethoxyamphetamine (TeMA-3)

== See also ==
- Substituted methoxyphenethylamine
- Methoxyamphetamine
- Dimethoxyamphetamine
- Trimethoxyamphetamine
- Pentamethoxyamphetamine
- Methoxyphenethylamine
- Dimethoxyphenethylamine
- Trimethoxyphenethylamine
- Tetramethoxyphenethylamine
- Pentamethoxyphenethylamine
