= 2,3,5,6-Tetramethoxyphenethylamine =

TeMPEA-3

Clinical data
- Other names: 2,3,5,6-TeMPEA; TeMPEA-3
- ATC code: None

Identifiers
- IUPAC name: 2-(2,3,5,6-tetramethoxyphenyl)ethanamine
- PubChem CID: 121008955
- ChemSpider: 62993366

Chemical and physical data
- Formula: C_{12}H_{19}NO_{4}
- Molar mass: 241.287 g·mol^{−1}
- 3D model (JSmol): Interactive image
- SMILES: COC1=CC(=C(C(=C1OC)CCN)OC)OC
- InChI: InChI=1S/C12H19NO4/c1-14-9-7-10(15-2)12(17-4)8(5-6-13)11(9)16-3/h7H,5-6,13H2,1-4H3; Key:MRCWRNATBFUERI-UHFFFAOYSA-N

2,3,5,6-Tetramethoxyphenethylamine (2,3,5,6-TeMPEA), also known as TeMPEA-3, is a drug of the phenethylamine family related to the psychedelic drug mescaline (3,4,5-trimethoxyphenethylamine). It is one of the possible positional isomers of tetramethoxyphenethylamine (TeMPEA).

The in-vitro metabolism and effects of TeMPEA-3 on behavior in animals have been studied. Unlike mescaline, TeMPEA-3 was inactive in the conditioned avoidance response test in rats. The effects of TeMPEA-3 in humans have not been reported and are unknown.

The drug was first described in the scientific literature by 1955. TeMPEA-3 was included as an entry in Alexander Shulgin's 2011 book The Shulgin Index, Volume One: Psychedelic Phenethylamines and Related Compounds. It is a controlled substance in Canada under phenethylamine blanket-ban language.

== See also ==
- Substituted methoxyphenethylamine
- Tetramethoxyphenethylamine (TeMPEA)
- 2,3,4,5-Tetramethoxyphenethylamine (TeMPEA, TeMPEA-1)
- 2,3,4,6-Tetramethoxyphenethylamine (TeMPEA-2)
- 2,3,5,6-Tetramethoxyamphetamine (TeMA-3)
- Pentamethoxyphenethylamine (PeMPEA)
- Trimethoxyphenethylamine (TMPEA)
