= ALPHA (drug) =

Chemical compound

Clinical data
- Other names: 3,4-Methylenedioxy-α-ethylbenzylamine; 1-Amino-1-(3,4-methylenedioxyphenyl)propane
- Routes of administration: Oral
- Drug class: Unknown
- ATC code: None

Pharmacokinetic data
- Duration of action: ~3 hours

Identifiers
- IUPAC name: 1-(1,3-Benzodioxol-5-yl)propan-1-amine
- CAS Number: 127292-42-6
- PubChem CID: 14647596
- ChemSpider: 11853242
- UNII: AC10C1L8VO
- CompTox Dashboard (EPA): DTXSID701027199 DTXSID70562589, DTXSID701027199

Chemical and physical data
- Formula: C_{10}H_{13}NO_{2}
- Molar mass: 179.219 g·mol^{−1}
- 3D model (JSmol): Interactive image
- SMILES: CCC(N)c1ccc2OCOc2c1
- InChI: InChI=1S/C10H13NO2/c1-2-8(11)7-3-4-9-10(5-7)13-6-12-9/h3-5,8H,2,6,11H2,1H3; Key:VEOUOCLRLNJOLJ-UHFFFAOYSA-N

ALPHA, also known as 3,4-methylenedioxy-α-ethylbenzylamine, is a psychoactive drug of the substituted benzylamine group and a positional isomer of 3,4-methylenedioxyamphetamine (MDA). It is also a benzylamine analogue of 3,4-methylenedioxyamphetamine (MDA). ALPHA was first synthesized by Alexander Shulgin. In his book PIHKAL on the MDA page, the threshold dosage is listed as 10 mg. At mild threshold dosages (around 10 mg) there are eyes-closed "dreams" with some body tingling, at higher doses (up to 140 mg) was reported to produce a pleasant, positive feeling. This compound is not anoretic at any dose. Its duration is about 3 hours. Very little data exists about the pharmacological properties, metabolism, and toxicity of ALPHA. The drug was encountered as a novel designer drug by 1996.

== See also ==
- M-ALPHA (N-methyl analogue)
- MDM1EA (3,4-methylenedioxy-α,N-dimethylbenzylamine)
- Methylenedioxybenzylpiperazine (MDBZP)
- Homo-MDA
- Homo-MDMA
- Indanorex
