= M-α-HMCA =

Chemical compound

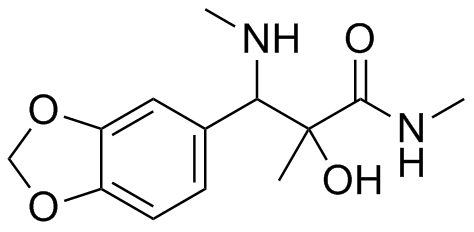

Identifiers
- IUPAC name: 3-(benzo[d][1,3]dioxol-5-yl)-2-hydroxy-N,2-dimethyl-3-(methylamino)propanamide
- CAS Number: 2593366-06-2
- UNII: HVY757Y35Z

Chemical and physical data
- Formula: C_{13}H_{18}N_{2}O_{4}
- Molar mass: 266.297 g·mol^{−1}
- 3D model (JSmol): Interactive image
- SMILES: NC(C(O)(C)C(NC)=O)C1=CC(OCO2)=C2C=C1
- InChI: InChI=InChI=1S/C12H16N2O4/c1-12(16,11(15)14-2)10(13)7-3-4-8-9(5-7)18-6-17-8/h3-5,10,16H,6,13H2,1-2H3,(H,14,15); Key:DOTWAAVOPAQLCB-UHFFFAOYSA-N

M-α-HMCA (3-(benzo[d][1,3]dioxol-5-yl)-2-hydroxy-N,2-dimethyl-3-(methylamino)propanamide) is an unintentional sideproduct during the synthesis of MDMA using PMK glycidate as a precursor. It was identified in MDMA pills. The biological properties of this molecule have not yet been documented. The backbone of the chemical structure is M-alpha whose psychoactive activity has been described by Alexander Shulgin.
