= Meta-Hydroxyephedrine =

meta-Hydroxyephedrine

Clinical data
- Other names: β,3-DHMA; β,3-Dihydroxymethamphetamine; 3-Hydroxyephedrine; 3-Oxyephedrine; 3-HED; HED; m-Hydroxyephedrine; m-Oxyephedrine;
- Drug class: Norepinephrine–dopamine reuptake inhibitor

Identifiers
- IUPAC name: 3-[1-Hydroxy-2-(methylamino)propyl]phenol
- CAS Number: 3002-40-2
- PubChem CID: 18147
- ChemSpider: 17141
- CompTox Dashboard (EPA): DTXSID20952431

Chemical and physical data
- Formula: C_{10}H_{15}NO_{2}
- Molar mass: 181.235 g·mol^{−1}
- 3D model (JSmol): Interactive image
- SMILES: CC(C(C1=CC(=CC=C1)O)O)NC
- InChI: InChI=InChI=1S/C10H15NO2/c1-7(11-2)10(13)8-4-3-5-9(12)6-8/h3-7,10-13H,1-2H3; Key:KEEFJRKWMCQJLN-UHFFFAOYSA-N

meta-Hydroxyephedrine, also known as 3-hydroxyephedrine (HED), amongst other names, is a reuptake inhibitor and, at the same time, a substrate (HED is transported into adrenergic neurons) for the norepinephrine transporter; it inhibits the dopamine transporter to a fairly small extent and has a minor effect on VMAT2 vesicular uptake.

== Pharmacology ==
HED exists in the form of four stereoisomers; at least each of them exhibits different potency towards the biological target, generally, the 1R-diastereomers are more active than the 1S-diastereomers; the potency of action in inhibiting NET can be described as 1R,2S > 1S,2S = 1S,2R > 1R,2R; the values were measured as IC_{50}, for the four isomers, the values were 0.422 ± 0.04, 1.03 ± 0.10, 1.18 ± 0.26 and 6.95 ± 1.1 µM respectively, making the 1R,2R isomer the weakest in terms of binding affinity.

They also inhibit DAT and VMAT2 and have very weak inhibitory effects on SERT; interestingly, the most potent isomer is not selective, 1S,2R HED showed the highest selectivity for NET compared with the dopamine transporter and VMAT2; nevertheless, 1R,2S HED is also more effective at inhibiting DAT and VMAT2, with IC_{50} values of 4.34 ± 1.4 and 23.7 ± 2.2 µM for 1R,2S isomer respectively, whilst 1S,2R HED was again very weak at inhibiting DAT (43.2 ± 5.7 µM) but was effective at inhibiting VMAT2, in contrast to 1R,2R HED, which had the poorest inhibition value (144 ± 18 µM). For all isomers, the inhibition values for SERT were >30 µM.
