= GAMMA (drug) =

Clinical data
- Other names: γ; homo-MDPEA; 3,4-Methylenedioxyphenyl-propylamine; 1-Amino-3-(3,4-methylenedioxyphenyl)propane
- Routes of administration: Oral
- Drug class: Psychoactive drug
- ATC code: None

Pharmacokinetic data
- Duration of action: 4 hours

Identifiers
- IUPAC name: 3-(1,3-benzodioxol-5-yl)propan-1-amine
- CAS Number: 6301-13-9; 78498-59-6
- PubChem CID: 413015
- ChemSpider: 365714
- CompTox Dashboard (EPA): DTXSID00328675

Chemical and physical data
- Formula: C_{10}H_{13}NO_{2}
- Molar mass: 179.219 g·mol^{−1}
- 3D model (JSmol): Interactive image
- SMILES: C1OC2=C(O1)C=C(C=C2)CCCN
- InChI: InChI=1S/C10H13NO2/c11-5-1-2-8-3-4-9-10(6-8)13-7-12-9/h3-4,6H,1-2,5,7,11H2; Key:CLJLCLGOWKOKJF-UHFFFAOYSA-N

GAMMA, also known as homo-MDPEA or as 3,4-methylenedioxyphenylpropylamine, is a psychoactive drug belonging to the 3-phenylpropylamine family (compounds related to phenethylamines with a three-carbon chain) and a compound related to methylenedioxyphenethylamines.

== Use and effects ==
In his book PiHKAL (Phenethylamines I Have Known and Loved), Alexander Shulgin lists GAMMA's dose as 200 mg orally and its duration as 4 hours. The effects of GAMMA have been reported to include "some physical ill-at-ease, possible time distortion, and a feeling of being keenly aware of one's surroundings".

== Chemistry ==
=== Analogues ===
Analogues of GAMMA include homo-MDA and homo-MDMA, among others.

== History ==
GAMMA was first described in the scientific literature by Alexander Shulgin and Peyton Jacob III by 1982. Subsequently it was described further by Shulgin in his book PiHKAL (Phenethylamines I Have Known and Loved) in 1991.

== See also ==
- Phenylpropylamine
