= Dimethoxymethylenedioxyamphetamine =

Dimethoxymethylenedioxyamphetamine (DMMDA) may refer to:

- 2,5-Dimethoxy-3,4-methylenedioxyamphetamine (DMMDA or DMMDA-1; 2,5-dimethoxy-MDA)
- 2,5-Dimethoxy-3,4-methylenedioxymethamphetamine (DMMDMA or Methyl-DMMDA; 2,5-dimethoxy-MDMA)
- 2,3-Dimethoxy-4,5-methylenedioxymethamphetamine (DMMDMA-2; 2,3-dimethoxy-MDMA)
- 2,3-Dimethoxy-4,5-methylenedioxyamphetamine (DMMDA-2; 5,6-dimethoxy-MDA)
- 4,5-Dimethoxy-2,3-methylenedioxyamphetamine (DMMDA-3; 4,5-dimethoxy-ORTHO-MDA)
- 2,6-Dimethoxy-3,4-methylenedioxyamphetamine (DMMDA-4; 2,6-dimethoxy-MDA)
- 4,6-Dimethoxy-2,3-methylenedioxyamphetamine (DMMDA-5; 4,6-dimethoxy-ORTHO-MDA)
- 2,3-Dimethoxy-5,6-methylenedioxyamphetamine (DMMDA-6; 5,6-dimethoxy-ORTHO-MDA)

== See also ==
- Methoxymethylenedioxyamphetamine
- Substituted methylenedioxyphenethylamine
- Substituted methoxyphenethylamine
- Pentamethoxyamphetamine
