= Α-Ethyldopamine =

α-Ethyldopamine

Clinical data
- Other names: α-Ethyl-3,4-dihydroxyphenethylamine; DH-α-Et-PEA; AEDP; AED; 1,2-Dihydroxy-4-(2-amino-butyl)benzene
- ATC code: None

Identifiers
- IUPAC name: 4-(2-aminobutyl)benzene-1,2-diol
- PubChem CID: 20329954
- ChemSpider: 97479570

Chemical and physical data
- Formula: C_{10}H_{15}NO_{2}
- Molar mass: 181.235 g·mol^{−1}
- 3D model (JSmol): Interactive image
- SMILES: CCC(CC1=CC(=C(C=C1)O)O)N
- InChI: InChI=1S/C10H15NO2/c1-2-8(11)5-7-3-4-9(12)10(13)6-7/h3-4,6,8,12-13H,2,5,11H2,1H3; Key:ZVTVIPHSXNUZQH-UHFFFAOYSA-N

α-Ethyldopamine (α-ethyl-3,4-dihydroxyphenethylamine; AED; AEDP) also known by the abbreviation DHABB, is a phase I metabolite of the drug benzodioxolylbutanamine (BDB) in humans. It is metabolised by the enzymes CYP2D6 and CYP3A4.

== See also ==
- Substituted α-ethylphenethylamine
- α-Methyldopamine
