= 3,5-Dimethoxyamphetamine =

Clinical data
- Other names: 3,5-DMA; DMA-6
- Drug class: Serotonin receptor modulator
- ATC code: None

Identifiers
- IUPAC name: 1-(3,5-dimethoxyphenyl)propan-2-amine
- CAS Number: 15402-82-1
- PubChem CID: 91247
- ChemSpider: 82397
- UNII: 4U6LN22RX4
- CompTox Dashboard (EPA): DTXSID201345742

Chemical and physical data
- Formula: C_{11}H_{17}NO_{2}
- Molar mass: 195.262 g·mol^{−1}
- 3D model (JSmol): Interactive image
- SMILES: CC(CC1=CC(=CC(=C1)OC)OC)N
- InChI: InChI=1S/C11H17NO2/c1-8(12)4-9-5-10(13-2)7-11(6-9)14-3/h5-8H,4,12H2,1-3H3; Key:PDCLPGSYMZLLDX-UHFFFAOYSA-N

3,5-Dimethoxyamphetamine (3,5-DMA), also known as DMA-6, is a drug of the amphetamine family and a positional isomer of dimethoxyamphetamine (DMA). It is the parent structure of the 3C (4-substituted 3,5-dimethoxyamphetamine) family of compounds (also known as 3C-scalines).

== Use and effects ==
The properties and effects of 3,5-DMA in humans have not been reported.

== Pharmacology ==
=== Pharmacodynamics ===
In an early study, it showed similar affinity for serotonin receptors as mescaline (3,4,5-trimethoxyphenethylamine) but had more than an order of magnitude lower affinity than DOx (4-substituted 2,5-dimethoxyamphetamine) drugs like DOM, DOET, and DOB. However, in a later study, it showed no or very low affinity for the serotonin 5-HT_{2A} and 5-HT_{2C} receptors (K_{i} = >10,000 nM), whereas DOB showed high affinity for these receptors (K_{i} = 32 nM and 64 nM, respectively).

3,5-DMA's effects on monoamine reuptake and efflux have also been studied. It appeared to be weak or inactive as a norepinephrine reuptake inhibitor and norepinephrine releasing agent. Likewise, it was a very weak serotonin reuptake inhibitor (IC_{50} = 18,500 nM) and serotonin releasing agent (active at ≥10,000 nM).

3,5-DMA was inactive in substituting for DOM in rodent drug discrimination tests (4–14% appropriate responding for 5–12.5 mg/kg), suggesting that it would not be hallucinogenic in humans. However, it has shown other pharmacological effects in mice and with similar potency as mescaline, whereas it was inactive in rats.

== Chemistry ==
=== Synthesis ===
The chemical synthesis of 3,5-DMA has been described.

== History ==
3,5-DMA was first described in the scientific literature by F. Benington and colleagues by at least 1968. It was not included as an entry in Alexander Shulgin's 1991 book PiHKAL (Phenethylamines I Have Known and Loved), but was subsequently included as an entry in his 2011 book The Shulgin Index, Volume One: Psychedelic Phenethylamines and Related Compounds. The drug has been detected as an adulterant in forensic drug samples.

== Society and culture ==
=== Legal status ===
As a positional isomer of 2,5-dimethoxyamphetamine (2,5-DMA; DMA-4), 3,5-DMA is a Schedule I controlled substance in the United States. It is also a controlled substance in Canada as an analogue of amphetamine.

== See also ==
- Dimethoxyamphetamine
- Substituted methoxyphenethylamine
- 3C (psychedelics)
- 3,5-Dimethoxyphenethylamine (3,5-DMPEA)
- 4-Br-3,5-DMA
