= 2-Methoxyphenethylamine =

Clinical data
- Other names: 2-MPEA; ortho-Methoxyphenethylamine; o-Methoxyphenethylamine
- Drug class: Trace amine-associated receptor 1 (TAAR1) agonist
- ATC code: None

Identifiers
- IUPAC name: 2-(2-methoxyphenyl)ethanamine
- CAS Number: 2045-79-6
- PubChem CID: 74896
- ChemSpider: 67459
- UNII: A87YWS9XM3
- ChEMBL: ChEMBL100635
- CompTox Dashboard (EPA): DTXSID00174412
- ECHA InfoCard: 100.016.425

Chemical and physical data
- Formula: C_{9}H_{13}NO
- Molar mass: 151.209 g·mol^{−1}
- 3D model (JSmol): Interactive image
- SMILES: COC1=CC=CC=C1CCN
- InChI: InChI=1S/C9H13NO/c1-11-9-5-3-2-4-8(9)6-7-10/h2-5H,6-7,10H2,1H3; Key:WSWPCNMLEVZGSM-UHFFFAOYSA-N

2-Methoxyphenethylamine (2-MPEA) is a drug of the phenethylamine family. It is one of the methoxyphenethylamine positional isomers.

== Use and effects ==
The effects of 2-MPEA in humans have not been reported and are unknown.

== Pharmacology ==
The drug showed very low affinity for the serotonin receptors in the rat stomach fundus strip (A_{2} = 3,020 nM). In another study, it showed no affinity for the serotonin 5-HT_{2A} or 5-HT_{2C} receptors (K_{i} = >10,000 nM). 2-MPEA is a potent full agonist of the human trace amine-associated receptor 1 (TAAR1) (EC_{50} = 144 nM; E_{max} = 95%).

== History ==
2-MPEA was first described in the scientific literature by at least 1943. It was included as an entry in Alexander Shulgin's 2011 book The Shulgin Index, Volume One: Psychedelic Phenethylamines and Related Compounds.

== See also ==
- Substituted methoxyphenethylamine
- Methoxyphenethylamine
- 2-Methoxyamphetamine
- Methoxyphenamine
