= Homo-MDMA =

Clinical data
- Other names: HMDMA; MDP-3-MB; α,N-Dimethyl-3-(3,4-methylenedioxyphenyl)propylamine; α,N-Dimethyl-1,3-benzodioxole-5-propylamine
- ATC code: None

Identifiers
- IUPAC name: N-methyl-N-(2-methylpropyl)-1,3-benzodioxol-5-amine
- CAS Number: 108248-08-4
- PubChem CID: 135381
- ChemSpider: 119255
- CompTox Dashboard (EPA): DTXSID00910655

Chemical and physical data
- Formula: C_{12}H_{17}NO_{2}
- Molar mass: 207.273 g·mol^{−1}
- 3D model (JSmol): Interactive image
- SMILES: CC(C)CN(C)C1=CC2=C(C=C1)OCO2
- InChI: InChI=1S/C12H17NO2/c1-9(2)7-13(3)10-4-5-11-12(6-10)15-8-14-11/h4-6,9H,7-8H2,1-3H3; Key:PUKMCMUXXJZVNY-UHFFFAOYSA-N

Homo-MDMA (HMDMA), also known as α,N-dimethyl-3-(3,4-methylenedioxyphenyl)propylamine, is an entactogen-like drug of the phenylpropylamine group related to MDMA. It is an analogue of MDMA in which the side chain has been lengthened by one carbon atom.

It showed very weak induction of serotonin release (much less than that of MDMA or methamphetamine) and no significant release of dopamine in rat brain synaptosomes. As such, its monoamine-releasing activity was said to have been essentially abolished relative to MDMA. The drug partially substituted for MDMA in rodent drug discrimination tests but produced seizures at high doses.

Based on unpublished findings by Alexander Shulgin, homo-MDMA has been said to be inactive in humans. However, it has been encountered as a designer and recreational drug in Japan and was being sold as "MBDB". It is not a controlled substance in the United States as of 2011.

== See also ==
- Homo-MDA
- Homo-MDPEA
- MDM1EA
- ALPHA
- M-ALPHA
