= 2,6-Dimethoxyamphetamine =

Clinical data
- Other names: 2,6-DMA; DMA-5
- Drug class: Serotonin receptor modulator
- ATC code: None

Identifiers
- IUPAC name: 1-(2,6-dimethoxyphenyl)propan-2-amine
- CAS Number: 23690-14-4
- PubChem CID: 141048
- ChemSpider: 124412
- UNII: GCG9F6BC2R
- ChEMBL: ChEMBL30577
- CompTox Dashboard (EPA): DTXSID40946493

Chemical and physical data
- Formula: C_{11}H_{17}NO_{2}
- Molar mass: 195.262 g·mol^{−1}
- 3D model (JSmol): Interactive image
- SMILES: CC(CC1=C(C=CC=C1OC)OC)N
- InChI: InChI=1S/C11H17NO2/c1-8(12)7-9-10(13-2)5-4-6-11(9)14-3/h4-6,8H,7,12H2,1-3H3; Key:OHGNLLDQBKOWJW-UHFFFAOYSA-N

2,6-Dimethoxyamphetamine (2,6-DMA), also known as DMA-5, is a drug of the phenethylamine and amphetamine families. It is one of the positional isomers of dimethoxyamphetamine.

The drug has not been tested in humans and its effects in humans are unknown.

2,6-DMA showed very low affinity for serotonin receptors in rat stomach fundus strips (A_{2} = 8,130 nM). In a subsequent study, it showed no affinity for the serotonin 5-HT_{2A} or 5-HT_{2C} receptors (K_{i} = >10,000 nM). 2,6-DMA only partially substituted for DOM in rodent drug discrimination tests, with a maximum responding of 41% and behavioral disruption at higher doses. It did not substitute for dextroamphetamine in these tests.

The chemical synthesis of 2,6-DMA has been described.

2,6-DMA was first described in the scientific literature by Alexander Shulgin by 1969. At that time, he had not yet synthesized it and did not report its effects. 2,6-DMA is a positional isomer of 2,5-dimethoxyamphetamine (2,5-DMA) and hence is a Schedule I controlled substance in the United States.

== See also ==
- Dimethoxyamphetamine
- Substituted methoxyphenethylamine
- 2,6-Dimethoxyphenethylamine
