= UC-514321 =

Identifiers
- IUPAC name: 6-[(3,5-di-tert-butyl-4-hydroxyphenyl)-morpholin-4-ylmethyl]-1,3-benzodioxol-5-ol
- CAS Number: 299420-83-0
- PubChem CID: 339892
- ChemSpider: 301318

Chemical and physical data
- Formula: C_{26}H_{35}NO_{5}
- Molar mass: 441.568 g·mol^{−1}
- 3D model (JSmol): Interactive image
- SMILES: CC(C)(C)C1=CC(=CC(=C1O)C(C)(C)C)C(C2=CC3=C(C=C2O)OCO3)N4CCOCC4
- InChI: InChI=1S/C26H35NO5/c1-25(2,3)18-11-16(12-19(24(18)29)26(4,5)6)23(27-7-9-30-10-8-27)17-13-21-22(14-20(17)28)32-15-31-21/h11-14,23,28-29H,7-10,15H2,1-6H3; Key:XNARHFDDQALZPZ-UHFFFAOYSA-N

UC-514321 is an experimental drug which acts as an inhibitor of the proteins STAT3 and STAT5. This blocks the transcription of the enzyme Tet methylcytosine dioxygenase 1 (TET1), which plays an important role in the development of some kinds of cancer, primarily acute myeloid leukemia, but also some gliomas and uterine and testicular cancers. In tests on mice it was effective at delaying the progression of leukemia.
