= 3-Methoxyphenethylamine =

Clinical data
- Other names: 3-MPEA; meta-Methoxyphenethylamine; m-Methoxyphenethylamine; EA-1302; NSC-124706
- ATC code: None

Identifiers
- IUPAC name: 2-(3-methoxyphenyl)ethanamine
- CAS Number: 2039-67-0
- PubChem CID: 74866
- ChemSpider: 67430
- UNII: 7WX5W6GM6F
- ChEMBL: ChEMBL316698
- CompTox Dashboard (EPA): DTXSID10174327
- ECHA InfoCard: 100.016.381

Chemical and physical data
- Formula: C_{9}H_{13}NO
- Molar mass: 151.209 g·mol^{−1}
- 3D model (JSmol): Interactive image
- SMILES: COC1=CC=CC(=C1)CCN
- InChI: InChI=1S/C9H13NO/c1-11-9-4-2-3-8(7-9)5-6-10/h2-4,7H,5-6,10H2,1H3; Key:WJBMRZAHTUFBGE-UHFFFAOYSA-N

3-Methoxyphenethylamine (3-MPEA) is a drug of the phenethylamine family. It is one of the methoxyphenethylamine positional isomers.

The drug showed very low affinity for the serotonin receptors in the rat stomach fundus strip (A_{2} = 1,290 nM). 3-MPEA is a low-potency partial agonist of the human trace amine-associated receptor 1 (TAAR1) (EC_{50} = 1,444 nM; E_{max} = 73%). The effects of 3-MPEA in humans have not been reported and are unknown.

3-MPEA was first described in the scientific literature by at least 1943. It was studied at Edgewood Arsenal and received the code name EA-1302. The drug was included as an entry in Alexander Shulgin's 2011 book The Shulgin Index, Volume One: Psychedelic Phenethylamines and Related Compounds.

== See also ==
- Substituted methoxyphenethylamine
- Methoxyphenethylamine
- 3-Methoxyamphetamine
