= 2,3,4,5-Tetramethoxyphenethylamine =

TeMPEA

Clinical data
- Other names: TeMPEA; TeMPEA-1; 2,3,4,5-TeMPEA; 2-Methoxymescaline; Methoxymescaline; 2-Methoxy-TMPEA; 3-Methoxy-2C-O; 3-Methoxy-TMPEA-2
- ATC code: None

Identifiers
- IUPAC name: 2-(2,3,4,5-tetramethoxyphenyl)ethanamine
- CAS Number: 13022-03-2
- PubChem CID: 611405
- ChemSpider: 531480

Chemical and physical data
- Formula: C_{12}H_{19}NO_{4}
- Molar mass: 241.287 g·mol^{−1}
- 3D model (JSmol): Interactive image
- SMILES: COC1=C(C(=C(C(=C1)CCN)OC)OC)OC
- InChI: InChI=1S/C12H19NO4/c1-14-9-7-8(5-6-13)10(15-2)12(17-4)11(9)16-3/h7H,5-6,13H2,1-4H3; Key:GJKJPCJLMHZZFK-UHFFFAOYSA-N

2,3,4,5-Tetramethoxyphenethylamine (TeMPEA or 2,3,4,5-TeMPEA), also known as 2-methoxymescaline, is a drug of the phenethylamine family related to mescaline (3,4,5-trimethoxyphenethylamine) and the 2C drugs (4-substituted 2,5-dimethoxyphenethylamines). It was reported to be twice as potent as mescaline in producing behavioral changes in animals. However, it does not seem to have been tested in humans. The drug was not described in Alexander Shulgin's PiHKAL, though it was included in The Shulgin Index, Volume One: Psychedelic Phenethylamines and Related Compounds. It is a controlled substance in Canada under phenethylamine blanket-ban language. A derivative is 2,3,4,5-tetramethoxyamphetamine (TeMA), which was included in PiHKAL, and was reported to be inactive in humans at the tested doses.

== See also ==
- Substituted methoxyphenethylamine
- Tetramethoxyphenethylamine (TeMPEA)
- 2,3,4,6-Tetramethoxyphenethylamine (2,3,4,6-TeMPEA; TeMPEA-2)
- 2,3,5,6-Tetramethoxyphenethylamine (2,3,5,6-TeMPEA; TeMPEA-3)
- 2-Methylmescaline
- 2-Chloromescaline
- 2-Bromomescaline
- 2-Iodomescaline
