= Tetramethoxyphenethylamine =

Tetramethoxyphenethylamines (TeMPEA) are a group of positional isomers of the psychedelic cactus alkaloid mescaline. Some of them are described in the book PiHKAL by Alexander Shulgin and Ann Shulgin.

- 2,3,4,5-Tetramethoxyphenethylamine (TeMPEA-1)
- TeMPEA-2 (2,3,4,6-tetramethoxyphenethylamine)
- TeMPEA-3 (2,3,5,6-tetramethoxyphenethylamine)
- BOM (drug) (3,4,5,β-tetramethoxyphenethylamine)

== See also ==
- Substituted methoxyphenethylamine
- Methoxyphenethylamine
- Dimethoxyphenethylamine
- Trimethoxyphenethylamine
- Pentamethoxyphenethylamine
- Methoxyamphetamine
- Dimethoxyamphetamine
- Trimethoxyamphetamine
- Tetramethoxyamphetamine
- Pentamethoxyamphetamine
