= 2,6-Dimethoxyphenethylamine =

Clinical data
- Other names: 2,6-DMPEA; DMPEA-5
- ATC code: None

Identifiers
- IUPAC name: 2-(2,6-dimethoxyphenyl)ethanamine
- CAS Number: 486-95-3
- PubChem CID: 417602
- ChemSpider: 369663

Chemical and physical data
- Formula: C_{10}H_{15}NO_{2}
- Molar mass: 181.235 g·mol^{−1}
- 3D model (JSmol): Interactive image
- SMILES: COC1=C(C(=CC=C1)OC)CCN
- InChI: InChI=1S/C10H15NO2/c1-12-9-4-3-5-10(13-2)8(9)6-7-11/h3-5H,6-7,11H2,1-2H3; Key:VIHNHLSXVPNVPY-UHFFFAOYSA-N

2,6-Dimethoxyphenethylamine (2,6-DMPEA), also known as DMPEA-5, is a drug of the phenethylamine family related to the psychedelic drug mescaline (3,4,5-trimethoxyphenethylamine). It is one of the positional isomers of dimethoxyphenethylamine.

Its in-vitro metabolism and effects on cat behavior have been described. The drug showed no activity as a norepinephrine reuptake inhibitor or releasing agent in vitro. It is relatively unaffected by monoamine oxidase (MAO) and is said to be behaviorally inactive in animals. The effects of 2,6-DMPEA in humans have not been reported and are unknown.

2,6-DMPEA was first described in the scientific literature by at least 1962. It was included as an entry in Alexander Shulgin's 2011 book The Shulgin Index, Volume One: Psychedelic Phenethylamines and Related Compounds.

Notable derivatives of 2,6-DMPEA include the psychedelic and related drugs Ψ-2C-T-4 (psi-2C-T-4), ψ-DOM (psi-DOM), and CT-5172.

== See also ==
- Substituted methoxyphenethylamine
- Dimethoxyphenethylamine
- 2,6-Dimethoxyamphetamine
- TMA-6 (2,4,6-trimethoxyamphetamine)
