= 4-Methoxyphenethylamine =

Clinical data
- Other names: 4-MPEA; para-Methoxyphenethylamine; p-Methoxyphenethylamine; PMPEA; O-Methyltyramine; Methyltyramine; Tyramine methyl ether; Homoanisylamine; NSC-43687
- Drug class: Monoamine releasing agent
- ATC code: None

Identifiers
- IUPAC name: 2-(4-methoxyphenyl)ethanamine
- CAS Number: 55-81-2
- PubChem CID: 4657
- ChemSpider: 4496
- UNII: UCE8P23XWF
- ChEBI: CHEBI:266039
- ChEMBL: ChEMBL101036

Chemical and physical data
- Formula: C_{9}H_{13}NO
- Molar mass: 151.209 g·mol^{−1}
- 3D model (JSmol): Interactive image
- SMILES: COC1=CC=C(C=C1)CCN
- InChI: InChI=1S/C9H13NO/c1-11-9-4-2-8(3-5-9)6-7-10/h2-5H,6-7,10H2,1H3; Key:LTPVSOCPYWDIFU-UHFFFAOYSA-N

4-Methoxyphenethylamine (4-MPEA), also known as O-methyltyramine, is a drug of the phenethylamine family. It is one of the methoxyphenethylamine positional isomers. Along with mescaline (3,4,5-trimethoxyphenethylamine), 4-MPEA is naturally occurring in Lophophora williamsii (peyote) and other cacti. It has also been found in the flowering plant Erica lusitanica, as well as in human urine.

== Use and effects ==
4-MPEA was inactive in humans at a dose of up to 400 mg orally.

== Pharmacology ==
=== Pharmacodynamics ===
4-MPEA has been found to act as a serotonin releasing agent and norepinephrine releasing agent in vitro. It has also been found to be very weakly active as a dopamine reuptake inhibitor, whereas dopamine release induction does not appear to have been assessed. The drug showed very low affinity for the serotonin receptors in the rat stomach fundus strip (A_{2} = 7,940 nM). 4-MPEA is a very-low-potency partial agonist of the human trace amine-associated receptor 1 (TAAR1) (EC_{50} = 5,980 nM; E_{max} = 106%).

In animals, 4-MPEA produced catalepsy, catatonia, a hypokinetic rigid syndrome, and indirect sympathomimetic effects, among other effects.

=== Pharmacokinetics ===
The drug is metabolized by monoamine oxidase (MAO), specifically monoamine oxidase B (MAO-B). It is thought to be rapidly metabolized by MAO such that it is rendered inactive.

== History ==
4-MPEA was first described in the scientific literature by at least 1931. It was included as an entry in Alexander Shulgin's 2011 book The Shulgin Index, Volume One: Psychedelic Phenethylamines and Related Compounds.

== See also ==
- Substituted methoxyphenethylamine
- Methoxyphenethylamine
- para-Methoxyamphetamine (PMA)
