= 2,3-Dimethoxyphenethylamine =

Clinical data
- Other names: 2,3-DMPEA; DMPEA-2
- ATC code: None

Identifiers
- IUPAC name: 2-(2,3-dimethoxyphenyl)ethanamine
- CAS Number: 3213-29-4
- PubChem CID: 137858
- ChemSpider: 121507
- UNII: LUW5Z6DJ9Q
- CompTox Dashboard (EPA): DTXSID10185913
- ECHA InfoCard: 100.154.035

Chemical and physical data
- Formula: C_{10}H_{15}NO_{2}
- Molar mass: 181.235 g·mol^{−1}
- 3D model (JSmol): Interactive image
- SMILES: COC1=CC=CC(=C1OC)CCN
- InChI: InChI=1S/C10H15NO2/c1-12-9-5-3-4-8(6-7-11)10(9)13-2/h3-5H,6-7,11H2,1-2H3; Key:XKBUFTXNLBWTFP-UHFFFAOYSA-N

2,3-Dimethoxyphenethylamine (2,3-DMPEA), also known as DMPEA-2, is a drug of the phenethylamine family related to the psychedelic drug mescaline (3,4,5-trimethoxyphenethylamine). It is one of the positional isomers of dimethoxyphenethylamine.

In contrast to various other phenethylamines like β-phenethylamine and amphetamine, it showed little activity in terms of induction of norepinephrine release in vitro. The effects of 2,3-DMPEA in humans have not been reported and are unknown.

2,3-DMPEA was first described in the scientific literature by at least 1965. It was included as an entry in Alexander Shulgin's 2011 book The Shulgin Index, Volume One: Psychedelic Phenethylamines and Related Compounds.

== See also ==
- Substituted methoxyphenethylamine
- Dimethoxyphenethylamine
- 2,3-Dimethoxyamphetamine
- Isomescaline (2,3,4-trimethoxyphenethylamine)
