= 3,5-Dimethoxyphenethylamine =

Clinical data
- Other names: 3,5-DMPEA; DMPEA-6; 4-Desmethoxymescaline; 4-Demethoxymescaline
- ATC code: None

Identifiers
- IUPAC name: 2-(3,5-dimethoxyphenyl)ethanamine
- CAS Number: 3213-28-3
- PubChem CID: 137857
- ChemSpider: 121506
- UNII: 2WL58YTU6N
- CompTox Dashboard (EPA): DTXSID50185912

Chemical and physical data
- Formula: C_{10}H_{15}NO_{2}
- Molar mass: 181.235 g·mol^{−1}
- 3D model (JSmol): Interactive image
- SMILES: COC1=CC(=CC(=C1)CCN)OC
- InChI: InChI=1S/C10H15NO2/c1-12-9-5-8(3-4-11)6-10(7-9)13-2/h5-7H,3-4,11H2,1-2H3; Key:ZHSFEDDRTVLPHH-UHFFFAOYSA-N

3,5-Dimethoxyphenethylamine (3,5-DMPEA), also known as DMPEA-6 or as 4-desmethoxymescaline, is an alkaloid of the phenethylamine family related to mescaline (3,4,5-trimethoxymescaline). It naturally occurs in the cactus Pelecyphora aselliformis. The effects of 3,5-DMPEA in humans are unknown. The compound may be considered the parent compound of the scalines (4-substituted 3,5-dimethoxyphenethylamines).

== See also ==
- Substituted methoxyphenethylamine
- Dimethoxyphenethylamine
- 2,5-Dimethoxyphenethylamine (2,5-DMPEA; 2C-H)
- 3,5-Dimethoxyamphetamine (3,5-DMA)
- Desoxyscaline
