= Homo-MDA =

Clinical data
- Other names: HMDA α-Methyl-γ-(3,4-methylenedioxyphenyl)propylamine; α-Methyl-1,3-benzodioxole-5-propanamine; 3,4-Methylenedioxyphenylaminobutane

Identifiers
- IUPAC name: 4-(1,3-benzodioxol-5-yl)butan-2-amine
- CAS Number: 40742-32-3
- PubChem CID: 162424
- ChemSpider: 142612
- ChEMBL: ChEMBL4534949
- CompTox Dashboard (EPA): DTXSID60961163
- ECHA InfoCard: 100.359.348

Chemical and physical data
- Formula: C_{11}H_{15}NO_{2}
- Molar mass: 193.246 g·mol^{−1}
- 3D model (JSmol): Interactive image
- SMILES: CC(CCC1=CC2=C(C=C1)OCO2)N
- InChI: InChI=1S/C11H15NO2/c1-8(12)2-3-9-4-5-10-11(6-9)14-7-13-10/h4-6,8H,2-3,7,12H2,1H3; Key:LWUIKWNECJUNDA-UHFFFAOYSA-N

Homo-MDA (HMDA), also known as α-methyl-γ-(3,4-methylenedioxyphenyl)propylamine, is a entactogen-like drug related to 3,4-methylenedioxyamphetamine (MDA). It is an analogue of MDA in which the side chain has been lengthened by one carbon atom.

Unlike the stimulant amphetamine and the psychedelic DOM, and in contrast to MDA, homo-MDA has no effect on locomotor activity in rodents. It was found to be more toxic than MDA in rodents.

The effects of homo-MDA in humans are unknown. It is not a controlled substance in the United States as of 2011.

== See also ==
- Homo-MDMA
- Homo-MDPEA
- MDM1EA
- ALPHA
- M-ALPHA
