= 2,3-Dimethoxyamphetamine =

Clinical data
- Other names: 2,3-DMA; DMA-2; NSC-172189
- Drug class: Serotonin receptor modulator
- ATC code: None

Identifiers
- IUPAC name: 1-(2,3-dimethoxyphenyl)propan-2-amine
- CAS Number: 15402-81-0
- PubChem CID: 91255
- ChemSpider: 82404
- UNII: P5Z6ZU6N7S
- ChEMBL: ChEMBL280855
- CompTox Dashboard (EPA): DTXSID20934898

Chemical and physical data
- Formula: C_{11}H_{17}NO_{2}
- Molar mass: 195.262 g·mol^{−1}
- 3D model (JSmol): Interactive image
- SMILES: CC(CC1=C(C(=CC=C1)OC)OC)N
- InChI: InChI=1S/C11H17NO2/c1-8(12)7-9-5-4-6-10(13-2)11(9)14-3/h4-6,8H,7,12H2,1-3H3; Key:DHLWJXGSZDJWKK-UHFFFAOYSA-N

2,3-Dimethoxyamphetamine (2,3-DMA), also known as DMA-2, is a drug of the phenethylamine and amphetamine families. It is one of the positional isomers of dimethoxyamphetamine.

2,3-DMA does not appear to have been tested in humans.

The drug showed weak affinity for serotonin receptors in rat stomach fundus strips (A_{2} = 2,880 nM). In a subsequent study, 2,3-DMA showed very low affinity for the serotonin 5-HT_{2A} and 5-HT_{2C} receptors (K_{i} = 4,280 nM and >10,000 nM, respectively). It did not show activity as a norepinephrine releasing agent in vitro. The drug is behaviorally active in mice. 2,3-DMA did not substitute for DOM in rodent drug discrimination tests. However, it did partially substitute for 5-MeO-DMT in these tests. As with DOM, the drug did not substitute for dextroamphetamine in drug discrimination tests. It produced behavioral disruption at higher doses.

The chemical synthesis of 2,3-DMA has been described.

2,3-DMA was first described in the scientific literature by F. Benington and colleagues by 1968. Alexander Shulgin first described 2,3-DMA in 1969 but had not yet synthesized it and did not report its effects.

== See also ==
- Dimethoxyamphetamine
- Substituted methoxyphenethylamine
- 2,3-Dimethoxyphenethylamine
