= MDM1EA =

Clinical data
- Other names: N-Methyl-1-(3,4-methylenedioxyphenyl)-1-ethanamine; MDM1EA; α,N-Dimethyl-3,4-methylenedioxybenzylamine; α,N-DMMDBA; α,N-Dimethylpiperonylamine; α,N-Dimethyl-1,3-benzodioxole-5-methanamine

Identifiers
- IUPAC name: 1-(1,3-benzodioxol-5-yl)-N-methylethanamine
- CAS Number: 121734-65-4
- PubChem CID: 6424509
- ChemSpider: 4930000
- CompTox Dashboard (EPA): DTXSID201343839

Chemical and physical data
- Formula: C_{10}H_{13}NO_{2}
- Molar mass: 179.219 g·mol^{−1}
- 3D model (JSmol): Interactive image
- SMILES: CC(C1=CC2=C(C=C1)OCO2)NC
- InChI: InChI=1S/C10H13NO2/c1-7(11-2)8-3-4-9-10(5-8)13-6-12-9/h3-5,7,11H,6H2,1-2H3; Key:USAUUVXZKYYZIL-UHFFFAOYSA-N

N-Methyl-1-(3,4-methylenedioxyphenyl)-1-ethanamine (MDM1EA), also known as α,N-dimethyl-3,4-methylenedioxybenzylamine (α,N-DMMDBA) or as α,N-dimethylpiperonylamine, is an entactogen-like drug of the benzylamine family related to MDMA. It is the analogue of MDMA in which the side chain has been shortened by one carbon atom.

The drug has been found to be a weak serotonin reuptake inhibitor and partially substituted for MDMA in rodent drug discrimination tests at the highest assessed doses. The effects of α,N-DMMDBA in humans are unknown.

It is not a controlled substance in the United States as of 2011.

Homo-MDMA (HMDMA), an analogue of MDMA in which the side chain was extended by one carbon atom, has also been synthesized and studied. It partially substituted for MDMA similarly to MDM1EA.

== See also ==
- MDxx § Related compounds
- ALPHA
- M-ALPHA
- Benzylpiperazine (BZP)
- Methylenedioxybenzylpiperazine (MDBZP)
- Homo-MDA
- Homo-MDMA
