= 2,4-Dimethoxyamphetamine =

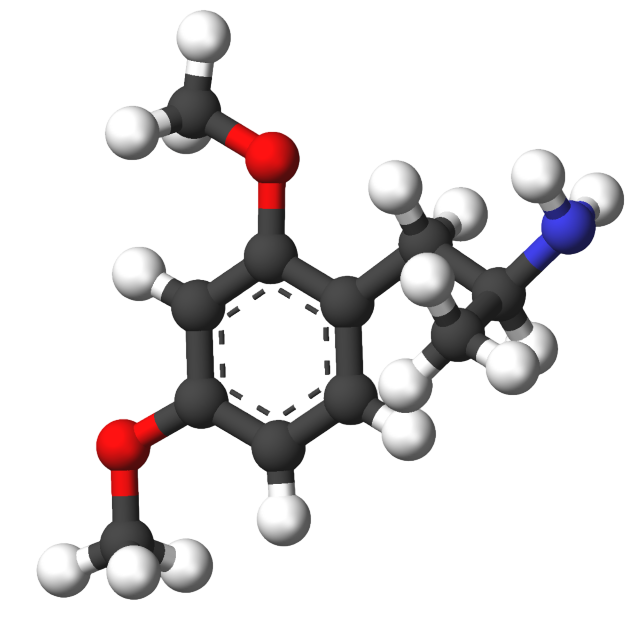

Clinical data
- Other names: 2,4-DMA; 2,4-Dimethoxy-α-methylphenethylamine; DMA-3
- Routes of administration: Oral
- Drug class: Serotonin receptor modulator; Serotonin 5-HT_{2A} receptor agonist; Psychoactive drug; Stimulant, Serotonergic psychedelic; Hallucinogen
- ATC code: None

Pharmacokinetic data
- Duration of action: "Short"

Identifiers
- IUPAC name: 1-(2,4-dimethoxyphenyl)propan-2-amine
- CAS Number: 23690-13-3 52850-81-4
- PubChem CID: 141047
- ChemSpider: 124411
- UNII: GT33R7Q58G
- ChEMBL: ChEMBL282734
- CompTox Dashboard (EPA): DTXSID90874252

Chemical and physical data
- Formula: C_{11}H_{17}NO_{2}
- Molar mass: 195.262 g·mol^{−1}
- 3D model (JSmol): Interactive image
- SMILES: CC(CC1=C(C=C(C=C1)OC)OC)N
- InChI: InChI=1S/C11H17NO2/c1-8(12)6-9-4-5-10(13-2)7-11(9)14-3/h4-5,7-8H,6,12H2,1-3H3; Key:DQWOZMUBHQPFFF-UHFFFAOYSA-N

2,4-Dimethoxyamphetamine (2,4-DMA), also known as DMA-3, is a psychoactive drug of the phenethylamine and amphetamine families. It is one of the dimethoxyamphetamine (DMA) series of positional isomers.

In his book PiHKAL (Phenethylamines I Have Known and Loved), Alexander Shulgin lists 2,4-DMA's dose as greater than 60 mg orally and its duration as "short". At a dose of 60 mg orally, the effects of 2,4-DMA were reported to include definite threshold effects or even a bit more, a lot of amphetamine-like effects, some euphoria, and a psychedelic-like "diffusion of association". The drug's effects started to wear off after 3 hours. According to Shulgin, 2,4-DMA could be a full stimulant and/or a full psychedelic at sufficiently high doses, but higher doses were not tested.

2,4-DMA has been found to act as a low-potency full agonist of the serotonin 5-HT_{2A} receptor, with an EC_{50} of 2,950 nM and an E_{max} of 117%. It fully substitutes for DOM in rodent drug discrimination tests. The drug is less potent in this regard than 2,4,5-trimethoxyamphetamine (2,4,5-TMA or TMA-2), but is more potent than 3,4,5-trimethoxyamphetamine (3,4,5-TMA or TMA-1). 2,4-DMA fails to produce stimulus generalization to dextroamphetamine in rodent drug discrimination tests, suggesting that it lacks psychostimulant- or amphetamine-like effects.

The chemical synthesis of 2,4-DMA has been described.

2,4-DMA was first described in the scientific literature by Alexander Shulgin and colleagues by at least 1967. Subsequently, it was described in greater detail by Shulgin in PiHKAL in 1991.

== See also ==
- Dimethoxyamphetamine
- Substituted methoxyphenethylamine
- 2,4,5-Trimethoxyamphetamine (TMA-2)
- 2,4,6-Trimethoxyamphetamine (TMA-6; ψ-TMA-2)
- 2,4-Dimethoxyphenethylamine
