= 2,3,4,5-Tetramethoxyamphetamine =

Chemical compound

TeMA

Clinical data
- Other names: TeMA; TA; 2,3,4,5-TeMA; 2,3,4,5-Tetramethoxyamphetamine; 2,3,4,5-Tetramethoxyphenylisopropylamine; 2-Methoxy-TMA; 2-Methoxy-3,4,5-TMA; 3-Methoxy-TMA-2; 3-Methoxy-2,4,5-TMA
- ATC code: None

Legal status
- Legal status: CA: Schedule I; UK: Class A

Identifiers
- IUPAC name: 1-(2,3,4,5-tetramethoxyphenyl)propan-2-amine
- CAS Number: 23693-26-7
- PubChem CID: 44350147
- ChemSpider: 23206528
- UNII: W39F9G7WET
- ChEMBL: ChEMBL124969
- CompTox Dashboard (EPA): DTXSID601027160

Chemical and physical data
- Formula: C_{13}H_{21}NO_{4}
- Molar mass: 255.314 g·mol^{−1}
- 3D model (JSmol): Interactive image
- SMILES: CC(Cc1cc(c(c(c1OC)OC)OC)OC)N
- InChI: InChI=1S/C13H21NO4/c1-8(14)6-9-7-10(15-2)12(17-4)13(18-5)11(9)16-3/h7-8H,6,14H2,1-5H3; Key:WVNJEHORYAZBRZ-UHFFFAOYSA-N

Tetramethoxyamphetamine (TeMA), or 2,3,4,5-tetramethoxyamphetamine (2,3,4,5-TeMA), also known as 2-methoxy-TMA or 3-methoxy-TMA-2, is a drug of the phenethylamine and amphetamine families related to mescaline (3,4,5-trimethoxyphenethylamine).

In his book PiHKAL (Phenethylamines I Have Known And Loved), Alexander Shulgin lists TeMA's "probably above 50 mg" orally and its duration as unknown. In an earlier publication, it was said to produce threshold effects at a dose of 30 mg orally and long-lived effects at a dose of 50 mg orally. The effects of TeMA have been reported to include disinhibition, intoxication, pupil dilation, and headache. It is said to be roughly 6 times as potent as mescaline. TeMA has been said to be the only amphetamine with more than three methoxy groups known to be hallucinogenic. However, the psychedelic properties of TeMA were subsequently questioned.

The chemical synthesis of TeMA has been described.

TeMA was first described in the scientific literature by at least 1975. Subsequently, it was described in greater detail by Shulgin in PiHKAL in 1991. The drug is a controlled substance in Canada under phenethylamine blanket-ban language.

== See also ==
- Substituted methoxyphenethylamine
- Tetramethoxyamphetamine
- 2,3,4,5-Tetramethoxyphenethylamine (TeMPEA)
- 2,5-Dimethoxy-3,4-methylenedioxyamphetamine (DMMDA)
- 2-Bromo-TMA
