= Methylenedioxybenzylpiperazine =

Chemical compound

MDBZP

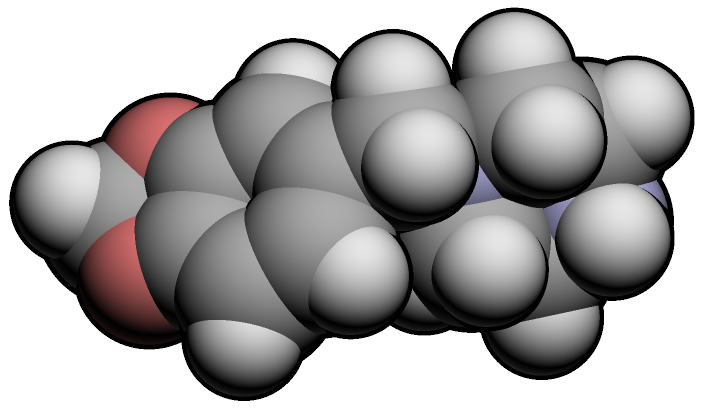

Clinical data
- Other names: 1-(3,4-Methylenedioxybenzyl)piperazine; MDBZP; MDBP; Piperonylpiperazine; N-Piperonylpiperazine
- ATC code: None

Legal status
- Legal status: DE: NpSG (Industrial and scientific use only)

Identifiers
- IUPAC name: 1-(Benzo[1,3]dioxol-5-ylmethyl)piperazine
- CAS Number: 32231-06-4
- PubChem CID: 94426
- ChemSpider: 85214
- UNII: 512G6R381X
- CompTox Dashboard (EPA): DTXSID70185994
- ECHA InfoCard: 100.046.319

Chemical and physical data
- Formula: C_{12}H_{16}N_{2}O_{2}
- Molar mass: 220.272 g·mol^{−1}
- 3D model (JSmol): Interactive image
- SMILES: c1cc2c(cc1CN3CCNCC3)OCO2
- InChI: InChI=1S/C12H16N2O2/c1-2-11-12(16-9-15-11)7-10(1)8-14-5-3-13-4-6-14/h1-2,7,13H,3-6,8-9H2; Key:NBOOZXVYXHATOW-UHFFFAOYSA-N

MDBZP, also known as 1-(3,4-methylenedioxybenzyl)piperazine or as piperonylpiperazine, is a chemical compound of the benzylpiperazine family related to benzylpiperazine (BZP). MDBZP has been sold as a designer drug and has even been found as an ingredient in street Ecstasy pills.

== See also ==
- Substituted benzylpiperazine
- MDM1EA
