= 2,5-Dimethoxyamphetamine =

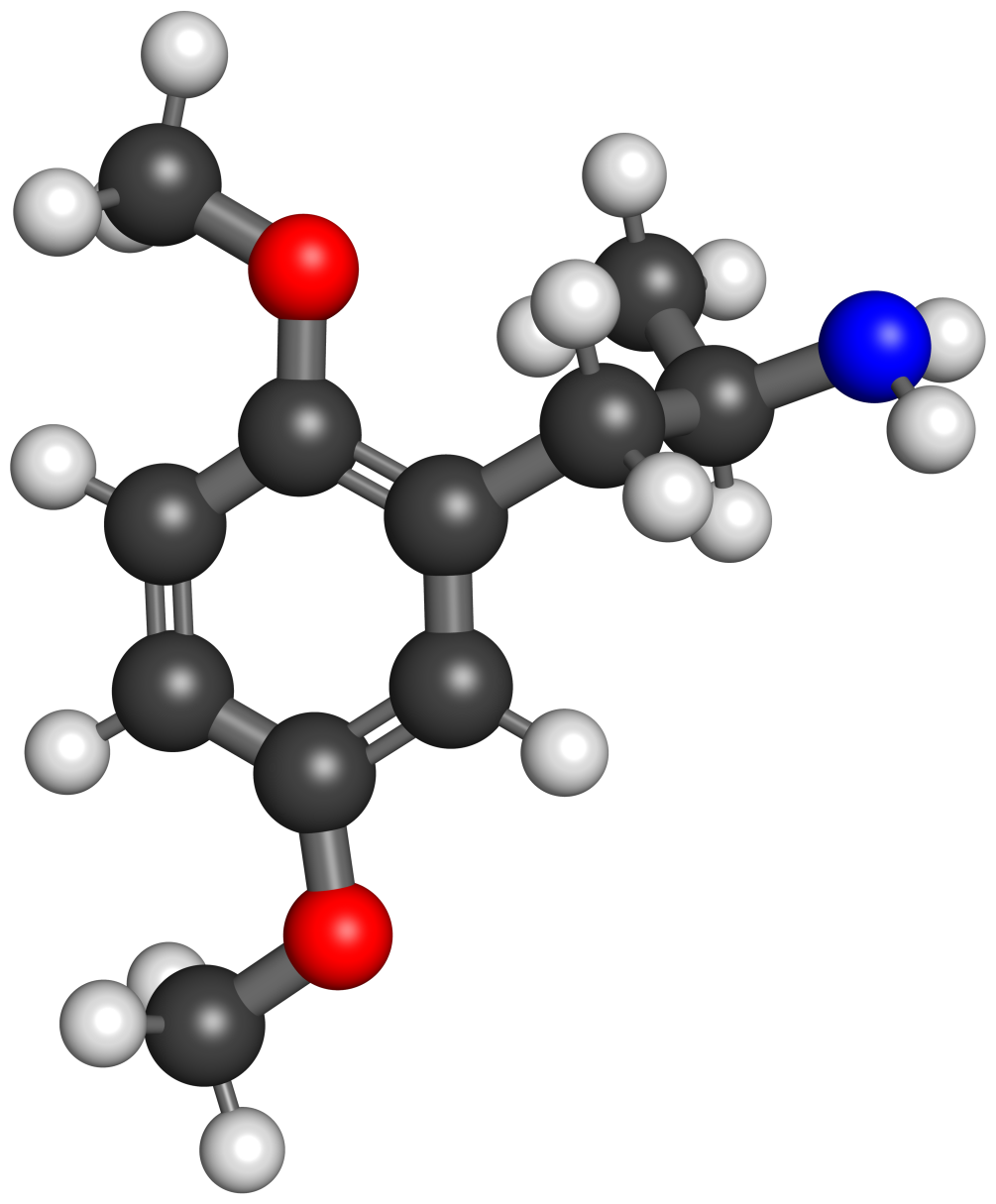

Clinical data
- Other names: 2,5-DMA; 2,5-Dimethoxy-α-methylphenethylamine; DMA; DMA-4; DOH; NSC-367445
- Routes of administration: Oral
- Drug class: Serotonin 5-HT_{2} receptor agonist; Serotonin 5-HT_{2A} receptor agonist; Stimulant
- ATC code: None

Pharmacokinetic data
- Onset of action: 1 hour
- Duration of action: 5–8 hours

Identifiers
- IUPAC name: 1-(2,5-dimethoxyphenyl)propan-2-amine
- CAS Number: 2801-68-5
- PubChem CID: 62787
- DrugBank: DB01465
- ChemSpider: 56526
- UNII: OIM1536TQQ
- KEGG: C22738
- ChEMBL: ChEMBL8642
- CompTox Dashboard (EPA): DTXSID2091540
- ECHA InfoCard: 100.018.673

Chemical and physical data
- Formula: C_{11}H_{17}NO_{2}
- Molar mass: 195.262 g·mol^{−1}
- 3D model (JSmol): Interactive image
- SMILES: CC(CC1=C(C=CC(=C1)OC)OC)N
- InChI: InChI=1S/C11H17NO2/c1-8(12)6-9-7-10(13-2)4-5-11(9)14-3/h4-5,7-8H,6,12H2,1-3H3; Key:LATVFYDIBMDBSY-UHFFFAOYSA-N

2,5-Dimethoxyamphetamine (2,5-DMA), also known as DMA-4 or as DOH, is a psychoactive drug of the phenethylamine and amphetamine families. It is one of the dimethoxyamphetamine (DMA) series of positional isomers. The drug is notable in being the parent compound of the DOx (4-substituted-2,5-dimethoxyamphetamine) series of psychedelic drugs. It is taken orally.

== Use and effects ==
In his book PiHKAL (Phenethylamines I Have Known and Loved), Alexander Shulgin lists 2,5-DMA's dose as 80 to 160 mg orally and its duration is 6 to 8 hours. Information on the qualitative effects of 2,5-DMA is said to be very sparse. According to Shulgin, it produced threshold effects or a "plus-one" on the Shulgin Rating Scale at a dose of 80 mg orally, with the effects being completely physical and including tremors, some cardiovascular effects, and no sensory effects. He opted not to try higher doses.

Other reports were also reviewed in PiHKAL. According to a report from South America, a dose of 75 mg produced a largely pleasant intoxication, including increased interest in one's surroundings, but with no perceptual changes, no overt stimulation, and no physiological effects aside from slight pupil dilation. One other report of 250 mg 2,5-DMA tartrate, which would be equivalent to somewhere in the range of 150 to 200 mg of the hydrochloride salt, produced some "speedy" or amphetamine-like effects but no sensory changes. In an earlier review, Shulgin reported that 2,5-DMA produced stimulant-like effects at a dose of 50 mg, with effects including vertigo, a "closed visual field", slight muscular incoordination, modest central intoxication, slightly increased blood pressure, and "extreme hyperactivity". The onset was reported to be 1 hour and peak effects after 2 hours, with a total duration of 5 hours.

2,5-DMA has been encountered as a novel designer drug, with capsules of 200 mg of the hydrobromide salt, equivalent to 170 mg of the hydrochloride salt. It was initially misrepresented as mescaline or MDA before being named DMA. According to Shulgin, this might be an effective dose level that has not been formally clinically explored.

== Pharmacology ==
=== Pharmacodynamics ===
2,5-DMA activities
Target	Affinity (K_{i}, nM)
5-HT_{1A}	2,583–6,017
5-HT_{1B}	8,435 (rat)
5-HT_{1D}	ND
5-HT_{1E}	ND
5-HT_{1F}	ND
5-HT_{2A}	211–5,200 (K_{i}); 160–3,548 (EC_{50}); 58–109% (E_{max})
5-HT_{2B}	1,039 (K_{i}); 3,390–93,320 (EC_{50}); 93–94% (E_{max})
5-HT_{2C}	104–>10,000 (K_{i}); 124–3,144 (EC_{50}); 76–103% (E_{max})
5-HT_{3}	ND
5-HT_{4}	ND
5-HT_{5A}	ND
5-HT_{6}	ND
5-HT_{7}	ND
α_{1A}	5,363
α_{1B}–α_{1D}	ND
α_{2A}	4,385
α_{2B}–α_{2C}	ND
β_{1}, β_{2}	ND
D_{1}	ND
D_{2}	>13,000
D_{3}–D_{5}	ND
H_{1}–H_{4}	ND
M_{1}–M_{5}	ND
TAAR_{1}	>30,000 (EC_{50}) (human)
I_{1}	ND
σ_{1}, σ_{2}	ND
SERT	>7,000 (K_{i}); ND (IC_{50}); ND (EC_{50})
NET	>8,000 (K_{i}); ND (IC_{50}); ND (EC_{50})
DAT	>8,000 (K_{i}); ND (IC_{50}); ND (EC_{50})
MAO-A	>100,000 (IC_{50})
MAO-B	>100,000 (IC_{50})
Notes: The smaller the value, the more avidly the drug binds to the site. All proteins are human unless otherwise specified. Refs:

2,5-DMA is a low-potency serotonin 5-HT_{2A} receptor partial agonist, with an affinity (K_{i}) of 2,502 nM, an EC_{50} of 160 to 3,548 nM (depending on the signaling cascade and study), and an E_{max} of 66 to 109%. It has also been assessed at several other receptors. In a much earlier study, its affinities (K_{i}) were 1,020 nM at the serotonin 5-HT_{1} receptor and 5,200 nM at the serotonin 5-HT_{2} receptor. The drug does not appear to bind to the monoamine transporters, at least at the assessed concentrations (up to 7,000 nM). It was inactive at the human trace amine-associated receptor 1 (TAAR1). 2,5-DMA shows dramatically reduced potency as a serotonin 5-HT_{2A} receptor agonist compared to the DOx drugs, such as 2,5-dimethoxy-4-methylamphetamine (DOM).

2,5-DMA produces the head-twitch response, a behavioral proxy of psychedelic effects, in rodents. However, it produces a very weak head-twitch response compared to other structurally related psychedelics like DOM, DOET, DOPR, and even DOBU. In addition, it is less potent in comparison. 2,5-DMA substitutes for DOM in rodent drug discrimination tests, albeit with dramatically lower potency than other DOx drugs. It also substitutes for 5-MeO-DMT in rodent drug discrimination tests. These findings suggesting that 2,5-DMA might produce weak hallucinogenic effects at sufficiently high doses. 2,5-DMA shows no substitution for dextroamphetamine in drug discrimination tests, suggesting that it lacks psychostimulant- or amphetamine-like effects, at least in rodents. Unlike other DOx drugs like DOM, DOPR, DOBU, and DOAM, 2,5-DMA does not produce hyperlocomotion in rodents and instead dose-dependently produces only hypolocomotion. On the other hand, it does similarly produce hypothermia at higher doses.

Though 2,5-DMA appears to be inactive or of very low potency as a psychedelic in humans, it is a highly potent anti-inflammatory drug similarly to other DOx and 2C drugs. This was in spite of it being of very low potency as a serotonin 5-HT_{2A} receptor agonist in terms of calcium mobilization in the study (EC_{50} = 3,548 nM; E_{max} = 109.0%). Based on the preceding findings, Charles D. Nichols has said that both fully anti-inflammatory non-psychedelic compounds like 2,5-DMA and fully psychedelic non-anti-inflammatory compounds like DOTFM are known.

=== Pharmacokinetics ===
2,5-DMA crosses the blood–brain barrier in rodents. It showed the lowest brain/plasma ratio among DOM and its higher homologues.

== Chemistry ==
=== Synthesis ===
The chemical synthesis of 2,5-DMA has been described.

=== Analogues and derivatives ===
Analogues and derivatives of 2,5-DMA include the DOx series like DOM, DOB, and DOI, FLY compounds like DOB-FLY, Bromo-DragonFLY (DOB-DFLY), DOH-5-hemiFLY, 25-NB compounds like DOM-NBOMe, DOB-NBOMe, and DOI-NBOMe, and other compounds like trimethoxyamphetamines (TMAs) and pentamethoxyamphetamine (PeMA). Methoxamine (β-hydroxy-2,5-DMA) is another derivative of 2,5-DMA. In addition, 2,5-dimethylamphetamine (2,5-DMeA) is a relevant analogue of 2,5-DMA.

== History ==
2,5-DMA was first described in the scientific literature by F. Benington and colleagues by at least 1968. Subsequently, it was described in greater detail by Alexander Shulgin in his 1991 book PiHKAL (Phenethylamines I Have Known and Loved).

== Society and culture ==
=== Manufacturing ===
2,5-DMA is used by Polaroid Corporation in the manufacturing of Polaroid film.

=== Legal status ===
==== Canada ====
2,5-DMA is a controlled substance in Canada.

==== United States ====
2,5-DMA is a schedule I controlled substance in the United States.

== See also ==
- Dimethoxyamphetamine
- Substituted methoxyphenethylamine
- DOx (psychedelics)
- Stimulant § Serotonin 5-HT_{2A} receptor agonists
- Motivation-enhancing drug § Serotonin 5-HT_{2A} receptor agonists
- 2,5-Dimethoxyphenethylamine (2C-H)
- 2,4,5-Trimethoxyamphetamine (2,4,5-TMA, TMA-2, or DOMeO)
- 5-HT_{2A} receptor § Anti-inflammatory effects
