= Pentamethoxyphenethylamine =

PeMPEA

Clinical data
- Other names: PeMPEA; 2,3,4,5,6-Pentamethoxyphenethylamine; 2,3,4,5,6-PeMPEA; 2,6-Dimethoxymescaline; 2,6-Dimethoxy-TMPEA; 3,6-Dimethoxy-2C-O; 3,6-Dimethoxy-TMPEA-2
- ATC code: None

Identifiers
- IUPAC name: 2-(2,3,4,5,6-pentamethoxyphenyl)ethanamine
- PubChem CID: 618053
- ChemSpider: 537125

Chemical and physical data
- Formula: C_{13}H_{21}NO_{5}
- Molar mass: 271.313 g·mol^{−1}
- 3D model (JSmol): Interactive image
- SMILES: COC1=C(C(=C(C(=C1OC)OC)OC)OC)CCN
- InChI: InChI=1S/C13H21NO5/c1-15-9-8(6-7-14)10(16-2)12(18-4)13(19-5)11(9)17-3/h6-7,14H2,1-5H3; Key:SRUXXIUKHPJJRC-UHFFFAOYSA-N

Pentamethoxyphenethylamine (PeMPEA), also known as 2,3,4,5,6-pentamethoxyphenethylamine (2,3,4,5,6-PeMPEA) or as 2,6-dimethoxymescaline, is a drug of the phenethylamine family related to the psychedelic drug mescaline (3,4,5-trimethoxyphenethylamine).

It has been found to produce behavioral effects in animals, with about 8-fold higher potency than mescaline in the conditioned avoidance response test. The pharmacokinetics of the drug in rodents have been studied. The effects of PeMPEA in humans have not been reported and are unknown.

It was first described in the scientific literature by 1955. PeMPEA was included as an entry in Alexander Shulgin's 2011 book The Shulgin Index, Volume One: Psychedelic Phenethylamines and Related Compounds. It is a controlled substance in Canada under phenethylamine blanket-ban language.

== See also ==
- Substituted methoxyphenethylamine
- Pentamethoxyamphetamine (PeMA)
- Tetramethoxyphenethylamine
- 2,3,4,5-Tetramethoxyphenethylamine (TeMPEA)
- 2,3,4,5-Tetramethoxyamphetamine (TeMA)
- Dimethoxymethylenedioxyamphetamine (DMMDA)
- 2,6-Dimethylmescaline
- 2,6-Dibromomescaline
- 2,6-Dichloromescaline
