= 2,4-Dimethoxyphenethylamine =

Clinical data
- Other names: 2,4-DMPEA; DMPEA-3; 24; 24DMP
- Drug class: Serotonin 5-HT_{2A} receptor agonist
- ATC code: None

Identifiers
- IUPAC name: 2-(2,4-dimethoxyphenyl)ethanamine
- CAS Number: 15806-29-8
- PubChem CID: 417604
- ChemSpider: 369665
- ChEMBL: ChEMBL4535193
- CompTox Dashboard (EPA): DTXSID20329129

Chemical and physical data
- Formula: C_{10}H_{15}NO_{2}
- Molar mass: 181.235 g·mol^{−1}
- 3D model (JSmol): Interactive image
- SMILES: COC1=CC(=C(C=C1)CCN)OC
- InChI: InChI=1S/C10H15NO2/c1-12-9-4-3-8(5-6-11)10(7-9)13-2/h3-4,7H,5-6,11H2,1-2H3; Key:YDTQAPOROITHCN-UHFFFAOYSA-N

2,4-Dimethoxyphenethylamine (2,4-DMPEA), also known as DMPEA-3, is a drug of the phenethylamine family related to the psychedelic drug mescaline (3,4,5-trimethoxyphenethylamine). It is one of the positional isomers of dimethoxyphenethylamine.

The in-vitro metabolism of 2,3-DMPEA and its effects on cat behavior have been studied. The drug is known to act as a low-potency partial agonist of the serotonin 5-HT_{2A} receptor (K_{i} = 202–999 nM; EC_{50} = 832–4,034 nM; E_{max} = 67–83%). The effects of 2,4-DMPEA in humans have not been reported and are unknown.

2,4-DMPEA was first described in the scientific literature by at least 1964. It was included as an entry in Alexander Shulgin's 2011 book The Shulgin Index, Volume One: Psychedelic Phenethylamines and Related Compounds.

NBOMe and NBOH derivatives with potent serotonin 5-HT_{2A} receptor agonism, such as 24-NBOMe and 24-NBOH, have been synthesized and studied.

== See also ==
- Substituted methoxyphenethylamine
- Dimethoxyphenethylamine
- 2,4-Dimethoxyamphetamine
- Isomescaline (2,3,4-trimethoxyphenethylamine)
- 2C-O (2,4,5-trimethoxyphenethylamine)
