= Pentamethoxyamphetamine =

PeMA

Clinical data
- Other names: PeMA; 2,3,4,5,6-Pentamethoxyamphetamine; 2,3,4,5,6-PeMA; 2,6-Dimethoxy-TMA; 3,6-Dimethoxy-TMA-2
- ATC code: None

Identifiers
- IUPAC name: 1-(2,3,4,5,6-pentamethoxyphenyl)propan-2-amine
- CAS Number: 23693-29-0
- PubChem CID: 129681609

Chemical and physical data
- Formula: C_{14}H_{23}NO_{5}
- Molar mass: 285.340 g·mol^{−1}
- 3D model (JSmol): Interactive image
- SMILES: CC(CC1=C(C(=C(C(=C1OC)OC)OC)OC)OC)N
- InChI: InChI=1S/C14H23NO5/c1-8(15)7-9-10(16-2)12(18-4)14(20-6)13(19-5)11(9)17-3/h8H,7,15H2,1-6H3; Key:CDUJLDXLXICILS-UHFFFAOYSA-N

Pentamethoxyamphetamine (PeMA), also known as 2,3,4,5,6-pentamethoxyamphetamine (2,3,4,5,6-PeMA), 2,6-dimethoxy-TMA, or 3,6-dimethoxy-TMA-2, is a chemical compound of the phenethylamine and amphetamine families related to the psychedelic drug mescaline (3,4,5-trimethoxyphenethylamine). It is the α-methyl or amphetamine derivative of pentamethoxyphenethylamine (PeMPEA). The compound does not seem to have been tested in animals or humans. However, the related drug PeMPEA is known to be behaviorally active in animal studies. PeMA was first described in the scientific literature by Alexander Shulgin by 1969. It is a controlled substance in Canada under phenethylamine blanket-ban language.

== See also ==
- Substituted methoxyphenethylamine
- Pentamethoxyphenethylamine
- Tetramethoxyamphetamine
- Tetramethoxyphenethylamine
- Trimethoxyamphetamine
- Dimethoxymethylenedioxyamphetamine
- DOTMA
