= 2C-H =

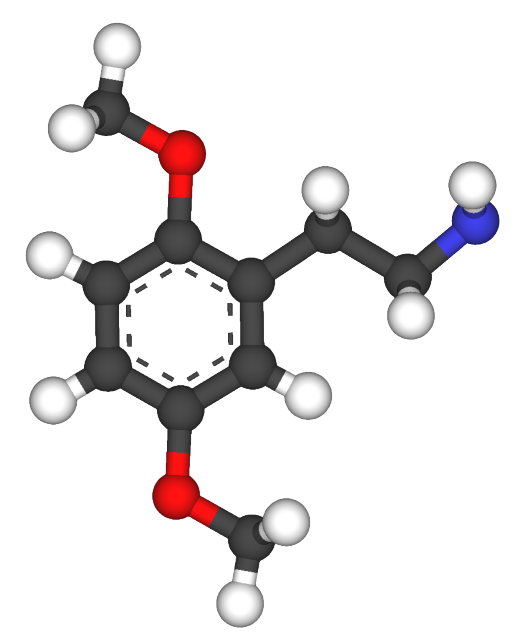

Clinical data
- Other names: 2,5-Dimethoxyphenethylamine; 2,5-DMPEA; DMPEA-4; NCS-168525; 2C-DOH
- ATC code: None

Pharmacokinetic data
- Onset of action: Unknown
- Duration of action: Unknown

Identifiers
- IUPAC name: 2-(2,5-dimethoxyphenyl)ethanamine
- CAS Number: 3600-86-0 3166-74-3 (hydrochloride)
- PubChem CID: 76632
- ChemSpider: 69096
- UNII: 9A8XF4GA0X
- ChEBI: CHEBI:125507
- ChEMBL: ChEMBL287047
- CompTox Dashboard (EPA): DTXSID80189564
- ECHA InfoCard: 100.153.556

Chemical and physical data
- Formula: C_{10}H_{15}NO_{2}
- Molar mass: 181.235 g·mol^{−1}
- 3D model (JSmol): Interactive image
- Melting point: 138 to 139 °C (280 to 282 °F) (hydrochloride)
- SMILES: COC1=CC(=C(C=C1)OC)CCN
- InChI: InChI=1S/C10H15NO2/c1-12-9-3-4-10(13-2)8(7-9)5-6-11/h3-4,7H,5-6,11H2,1-2H3; Key:WNCUVUUEJZEATP-UHFFFAOYSA-N

2C-H, also known as 2,5-dimethoxyphenethylamine (2,5-DMPEA) or as DMPEA-4, is a chemical compound of the phenethylamine and 2C families. It is the parent compound of the 2C drugs, which are also known as 4-substituted 2,5-dimethoxyphenethylamines.

== Use and effects ==
There is no record of 2C-H trials in humans, as it would likely be destroyed by monoamine oxidase enzymes before causing any significant psychoactive effects. In his book PiHKAL (Phenethylamines I Have Known and Loved), Alexander Shulgin lists both the dose and duration of 2C-H effects as unknown.

== Pharmacology ==
=== Pharmacodynamics ===
2C-H activities
Target	Affinity (K_{i}, nM)
5-HT_{1A}	70
5-HT_{1B}	ND
5-HT_{1D}	ND
5-HT_{1E}	ND
5-HT_{1F}	ND
5-HT_{2A}	1,600–3,000 (K_{i}); 2,408–>10,000 (EC_{50}); 17,800 (IC_{50}); 0–78% (E_{max})
5-HT_{2B}	6,200 (EC_{50}); 46% (E_{max})
5-HT_{2C}	4,100–5,520 (K_{i}); 1,175–3,967 (EC_{50}); 76% (E_{max})
5-HT_{3}	ND
5-HT_{4}	ND
5-HT_{5A}	ND
5-HT_{6}	ND
5-HT_{7}	ND
α_{1A}	7,900 (K_{i}); 11,000 (EC_{50})
α_{1B}, α_{1D}	ND
α_{2A}	1,000
α_{2B}, α_{2C}	ND
β_{1}–β_{3}	ND
D_{1}	>14,000
D_{2}	9,000
D_{3}	>17,000
D_{4}, D_{5}	ND
H_{1}	>25,000
TAAR1	11,000 (K_{i}) (mouse); 900 (K_{i}) (rat); 7,500 (EC_{50}) (mouse); 1,500 (EC_{50}) (rat); 2,010–6,500 (EC_{50}) (human); 56% (E_{max}) (mouse); 80% (E_{max}) (rat); 53–69% (E_{max}) (human)
SERT	>30,000 (K_{i}); 311,000 (IC_{50}); ND (EC_{50})
NET	>30,000 (K_{i}); 125,000 (IC_{50}); ND (EC_{50})
DAT	>30,000 (K_{i}); 857,000 (IC_{50}); ND (EC_{50})
MAO-A	ND (IC_{50})
MAO-B	1,700 (IC_{50})
Notes: The smaller the value, the more avidly the drug binds to the site. All proteins are human unless otherwise specified. Refs:

2C-H acts as a partial agonist of the serotonin 5-HT_{2A}, 5-HT_{2B}, and 5-HT_{2C} receptors, albeit with far lower potency than other 2C drugs. It also shows affinity for the serotonin 5-HT_{1A} receptor, higher than that of any other 2C drug. The drug exhibits agonist activity in vitro at the human trace amine associated receptor 1 (TAAR1).

2C-H produces visual and auditory changes in rodents, but is much less potent than other 2C drugs. It also produces hypolocomotion at high doses similarly to other psychedelics, but failed to affect prepulse inhibition in contrast to other psychedelics. The drug shows highly potent and fully efficacious anti-inflammatory effects.

== Chemistry ==
=== Synthesis ===
The chemical synthesis of 2C-H has been described. It is used as a precursor in the synthesis of other phenethylamines such as 2C-B, 2C-I, and 2C-N.

=== Analogues and derivatives ===
2C-H (2,5-DMPEA) is one of several possible positional isomers of dimethoxyphenethylamine (DMPEA).

2C-H is the parent compound of the 2C series of psychedelic drugs, also known as 4-substituted 2,5-dimethoxyphenethylamines. These drugs include 2C-B, 2C-C, 2C-D, 2C-E, and 2C-I, among others.

The N-methyl derivative of 2C-H, N-methyl-2C-H, has reduced activational potency and efficacy at the serotonin 5-HT_{2A} receptor compared to 2C-H.

== History ==
2C-H was first synthesized in 1932 by Johannes S. Buck.

== Society and culture ==
=== Legal status ===
==== Canada ====
As of October 31, 2016; 2C-H is a controlled substance (Schedule III) in Canada.

==== United States ====
As of July 9, 2012, 2C-H is a Schedule I controlled substance in the United States, under the Synthetic Drug Abuse Prevention Act of 2012. 2C-H's DEA Drug Code is 7517.

== See also ==
- Substituted methoxyphenethylamine
- 2C (psychedelics)
