= F (psychedelic) =

Clinical data
- Other names: F-1; 5-Methoxy-6-(2-Aminopropyl)-2,3-dihydrobenzofuran; 5-Methoxy-6-APDB; 5-MeO-6-APDB; 6-Methoxy-4-desoxy-MDA
- Drug class: Putative serotonergic psychedelic or hallucinogen
- ATC code: None

Identifiers
- IUPAC name: 1-(5-methoxy-2,3-dihydro-1-benzofuran-6-yl)propan-2-amine
- CAS Number: 99355-77-8
- PubChem CID: 13553507
- ChemSpider: 23183074
- ChEMBL: ChEMBL96079
- CompTox Dashboard (EPA): DTXSID901215108

Chemical and physical data
- Formula: C_{12}H_{17}NO_{2}
- Molar mass: 207.273 g·mol^{−1}
- 3D model (JSmol): Interactive image
- SMILES: CC(CC1=C(C=C2CCOC2=C1)OC)N
- InChI: InChI=1S/C12H17NO2/c1-8(13)5-10-7-12-9(3-4-15-12)6-11(10)14-2/h6-8H,3-5,13H2,1-2H3; Key:IUKWXRPAJLVHHN-UHFFFAOYSA-N

F, or F-1, also known as 5-methoxy-6-(2-aminopropyl)-2,3-dihydrobenzofuran (5-methoxy-6-APDB), is a putative psychedelic drug of the phenethylamine, DOx, and benzofuran families. It is the derivative of 2,5-dimethoxyamphetamine (2,5-DMA or DOH) in which the 5-methoxy group on the benzene ring has been cyclized into a tetrahydrofuran ring tethered at the 4 position. It is also an analogue of DOH-5-hemiFLY, but in contrast to DOH-5-hemiFLY, F has the 5-methoxy group tethered at the 4 position rather than at the 6 position. While related to them, F is not a FLY compound as its tetrahydrofuran ring is attached at different positions than FLY series compounds.

== Use and effects ==
According to Alexander Shulgin in 2011, the effects of F in humans are unknown. However, David E. Nichols reported in 1981, via personal communication with Shulgin and M. Trampota in 1980, that F was "shown to possess clinical activity". On the other hand, Shulgin reported in his 1991 book PiHKAL (Phenethylamines I Have Known and Loved) that F was inactive at doses of up to 30 mg.

== Pharmacology ==
=== Pharmacodynamics ===
F showed an affinity (K_{i}) of 388 nM for the serotonin 5-HT_{2} receptor, which was 21-fold lower than that of DOM. It fully substituted for LSD in rodent drug discrimination tests, albeit with about 14-fold lower potency than DOM. In subsequent publications by the same research group, it was said that F failed to show LSD-like activity, was "nearly inactive in an in vivo behavioral assay for hallucinogen-like activity in rats", or had "dramatically attenuated LSD-like behavioral effects in rats".

== Chemistry ==
=== Analogues ===
Analogues of F include DOET, 6-APDB, and MMDA-2, among others.

=== Derivatives ===
Derivatives of F, including F-2 and F-22, are known. They were described by Shulgin in his 1991 book PiHKAL (Phenethylamines I Have Known and Loved). These compounds feature one or two methyl groups at the distal position of the attached tetrahydrofuran ring. Both compounds were inactive as psychedelic drugs at the assessed doses in humans. F was 3-fold more potent than F-2 in animal studies.

== History ==
F was first described in the scientific literature by David E. Nichols and colleagues by 1981. It was briefly described by Alexander Shulgin in his 1991 book PiHKAL (Phenethylamines I Have Known and Loved) and was included as an entry in Shulgin's 2011 book The Shulgin Index, Volume One: Psychedelic Phenethylamines and Related Compounds. Shulgin briefly alluded to F and its derivatives in a paper in 1971.

== Society and culture ==
=== Legal status ===
The drug was not an explicitly controlled substance in the United States as of 2011.

== See also ==
- Substituted benzofuran
