= C11H15NO2S =

The molecular formula C_{11}H_{15}NO_{2}S (molar mass: 225.31 g/mol, exact mass: 225.0823 u) may refer to:

- Ethiofencarb
- Methiocarb
- 2T-MMDA-3a
- 4T-MMDA-2
