= 2,4,6-Trimethoxyphenethylamine =

Clinical data
- Other names: 2,4,6-TMPEA; TMPEA-6; 2C-TMA-6; ψ-2C-O
- Routes of administration: Oral
- ATC code: None

Legal status
- Legal status: US: Schedule I (isomer of mescaline)

Identifiers
- IUPAC name: 2-(2,4,6-trimethoxyphenyl)ethanamine
- CAS Number: 15873-23-1
- PubChem CID: 21679959
- ChemSpider: 10296635

Chemical and physical data
- Formula: C_{11}H_{17}NO_{3}
- Molar mass: 211.261 g·mol^{−1}
- 3D model (JSmol): Interactive image
- SMILES: COC1=CC(=C(C(=C1)OC)CCN)OC
- InChI: InChI=1S/C11H17NO3/c1-13-8-6-10(14-2)9(4-5-12)11(7-8)15-3/h6-7H,4-5,12H2,1-3H3; Key:CGUNKAXAEZSOFA-UHFFFAOYSA-N

2,4,6-Trimethoxyphenethylamine (2,4,6-TMPEA), also known as TMPEA-6, 2C-TMA-6, or ψ-2C-O, is a drug of the phenethylamine and Ψ-PEA families. It is a positional isomer of mescaline (3,4,5-trimethoxyphenethylamine) and 2C-O (2,4,5-trimethoxyphenethylamine) as well as the α-desmethyl analogue of 2,4,6-trimethoxyamphetamine (TMA-6). The drug has been encountered online as a novel designer drug.

== Use and effects ==
According to Alexander Shulgin in his book The Shulgin Index, Volume One: Psychedelic Phenethylamines and Related Compounds, citing personal communication with K. Ratzeburg in 2005, 2,4,6-TMPEA is active at a dose of 105 mg orally. However, according to Daniel Trachsel in his publications in 2012 and 2013, who cited personal communication with P. Rausch in 2009, the drug is inactive at doses of up to 300 mg or more. This would be similar to the case of 2C-O (inactive at >300 mg orally), but is in contrast to mescaline (active at ~180–360 mg orally) as well as TMA-6 (active at 25–50 mg orally).

== Pharmacology ==
=== Pharmacodynamics ===
Unlike mescaline, but similarly to 2C-O, 2,4,6-TMPEA does not appear to be a substrate for amine oxidase.

== Chemistry ==
=== Synthesis ===
The chemical synthesis of 2,4,6-TMPEA has been described.

=== Derivatives ===
A variety of derivatives of 2,4,6-TMPEA are known.

== History ==
2,4,6-TMPEA was first described in the scientific literature by 1954. Alexander Shulgin mentioned 2,4,6-TMPEA in his 1991 book PiHKAL (Phenethylamines I Have Known and Loved) and stated that its activity in humans was unknown at the time. Subsequently, its properties in humans were described by Shulgin and Daniel Trachsel between 2011 and 2013. The compound was encountered as a novel designer drug in Russia in 2023.

== Society and culture ==
=== Legal status ===
==== Canada ====
2,4,6-TMPEA is a controlled substance in Canada under phenethylamine blanket-ban language.

== See also ==
- Trimethoxyphenethylamine
- Ψ-PEA (psychedelics)
- Substituted methoxyphenethylamine
- 2,4,6-Trimethoxyamphetamine (2,4,6-TMA; TMA-6)
- Mescaline (3,4,5-trimethoxyphenethylamine)
- 2C-O (2,4,5-trimethoxyphenethylamine)
