= Allylguaiacol =

Allylguaiacol may refer to:

- 4-Allylguaiacol (eugenol)
- 5-Allylguaiacol (chavibetol)
