= MMDA =

MMDA may refer to:

- Madras Metropolitan Development Authority, former name of Chennai Metropolitan Development Authority
- Metropolitan Manila Development Authority
- MMDA (drug) (3-methoxy-4,5-methylenedioxyamphetamine), a psychedelic drug
- Money Market Deposit Account, also known as Money Market Account
- Metropolitan, municipal and district authority, a collective term to describe the local administrative divisions of Ghana. See Districts of Ghana.
