= Ψ-DOM =

Psychedelic drug

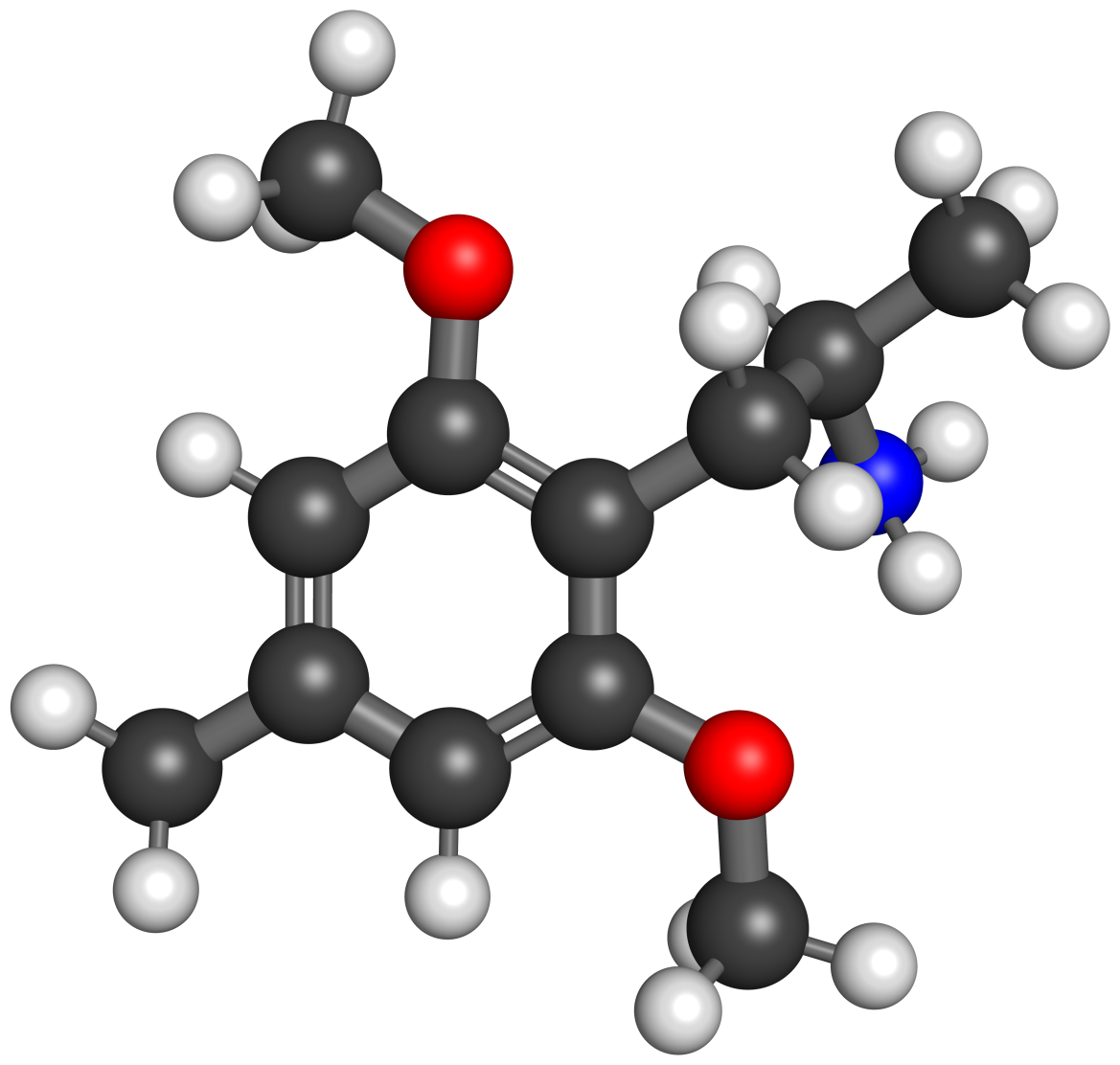

Clinical data
- Other names: Psi-DOM; Pseudo-DOM; Z-7; Z7; 2,6-Dimethoxy-4-methylamphetamine; 4-Methyl-2,6-dimethoxyamphetamine
- Routes of administration: Oral
- Drug class: Serotonin receptor modulator; Serotonin 5-HT_{2A} receptor agonist
- ATC code: None

Legal status
- Legal status: US: Schedule I (isomer of DOM)

Pharmacokinetic data
- Duration of action: 6–8 hours

Identifiers
- IUPAC name: 1-(2,6-dimethoxy-4-methylphenyl)-2-aminopropane
- CAS Number: 80888-36-4
- PubChem CID: 13753734
- ChemSpider: 21106372
- UNII: JW946TWT6M
- ChEMBL: ChEMBL293399
- CompTox Dashboard (EPA): DTXSID20548454

Chemical and physical data
- Formula: C_{12}H_{19}NO_{2}
- Molar mass: 209.289 g·mol^{−1}
- 3D model (JSmol): Interactive image
- Melting point: 203 °C (397 °F)
- SMILES: CC1=CC(=C(C(=C1)OC)CC(C)N)OC
- InChI: InChI=1S/C12H19NO2/c1-8-5-11(14-3)10(7-9(2)13)12(6-8)15-4/h5-6,9H,7,13H2,1-4H3; Key:CFFJUEYUTHKVMQ-UHFFFAOYSA-N

ψ-DOM, or psi-DOM, also known as 2,6-dimethoxy-4-methylamphetamine or as Z-7, is a psychedelic drug of the phenethylamine, amphetamine, and Ψ-PEA families related to DOM. It is a positional isomer of DOM in which the methoxy group at the 5 position has been relocated to the 6 position. The drug is taken orally.

== Use and effects ==
In his book PiHKAL (Phenethylamines I Have Known and Loved), Alexander Shulgin lists ψ-DOM's dose as 15 to 25 mg orally and its duration as 6 to 8 hours. The effects of ψ-DOM were reported to include feeling weird or strange, closed-eye imagery, some visuals, introspection, feeling stoned, spaciness, lightheadedness, muscle tremors, palpitations, and diarrhea. The visuals were said to have been less than expected based on the intensity of its effects. The drug is about one-third as potent as DOM.

== Pharmacology ==
=== Pharmacodynamics ===
ψ-DOM shows affinity for the serotonin 5-HT_{2A} and 5-HT_{2C} receptors (K_{i} = 49–351 nM and 50 nM, respectively). Its affinity for the serotonin 5-HT_{2A} receptor was about 2.6- to 3.5-fold lower than that of DOM. The drug acts as an agonist of the serotonin 5-HT_{2A} receptor similarly to DOM.

ψ-DOM has been found to substitute for LSD and 5-MeO-DMT in rodent drug discrimination tests. Conversely, it did not substitute for the serotonin 5-HT_{1A} receptor agonist LY-293284 in such tests.

== Chemistry ==
=== Synthesis ===
The chemical synthesis of ψ-DOM has been described.

=== Analogues ===
Analogues of ψ-DOM include other ψ-PEA derivatives like TMA-6 (ψ-TMA-2), Ψ-2C-T-4, and Ψ-DODFMO, among others.

== History ==
Ψ-DOM was first described in the literature by Alexander Shulgin in 1970. Subsequently, it was described in greater detail by Shulgin in his 1991 book PiHKAL (Phenethylamines I have Known and Loved).

== Society and culture ==
=== Legal status ===
==== Canada ====
Ψ-DOM is a controlled substance in Canada under phenethylamine blanket-ban language.

==== United States ====
Ψ-DOM is not an explicitly controlled substance in the United States. However, it could be considered a controlled substance under the Federal Analogue Act if intended for human consumption. In addition, it may be considered scheduled as a positional isomer of DOM.

== See also ==
- Ψ-PEA (psychedelics)
