= TMA-6 =

TMA-6 may refer to:

- 2,4,6-Trimethoxyamphetamine (TMA-6), a hallucinogenic drug
- Soyuz TMA-6, a Russian space exploration mission
