= F-22 (drug) =

Clinical data
- Other names: 6-(2-Aminopropyl)-2,2-dimethyl-5-methoxy-2,3-dihydrobenzofuran; Benzofuran-2,2-dimethyl-5-methoxy-6-(2-aminopropane); 2,2-DiMe-5-MeO-6-APDB
- Routes of administration: Oral
- ATC code: None

Pharmacokinetic data
- Duration of action: Unknown

Identifiers
- IUPAC name: 1-(5-methoxy-2,2-dimethyl-2,3-dihydro-1-benzofuran-6-yl)propan-2-amine
- CAS Number: 952016-51-2
- PubChem CID: 16051705
- ChemSpider: 13180083
- UNII: QS9HMZ85HN
- CompTox Dashboard (EPA): DTXSID50581591

Chemical and physical data
- Formula: C_{14}H_{21}NO_{2}
- Molar mass: 235.327 g·mol^{−1}
- 3D model (JSmol): Interactive image
- SMILES: C1=C2C(=CC(=C1CC(C)N)OC)CC(O2)(C)C
- InChI: InChI=1S/C14H21NO2/c1-9(15)5-10-6-13-11(7-12(10)16-4)8-14(2,3)17-13/h6-7,9H,5,8,15H2,1-4H3; Key:ZUGGTXPIKSRFHP-UHFFFAOYSA-N

F-22, also known as 6-(2-aminopropyl)-2,2-dimethyl-5-methoxy-2,3-dihydrobenzofuran or as benzofuran-2,2-dimethyl-5-methoxy-6-(2-aminopropane), is a chemical compound of the phenethylamine, amphetamine, and benzofuran families. It is the derivative of 6-APDB with two methyl groups at the 2 position and a methoxy group at the 5 position of the benzofuran ring system.

== Use and effects ==
In his book PiHKAL (Phenethylamines I Have Known and Loved) and other publications, Alexander Shulgin lists F-22's dose as greater than 15 mg orally and its duration as unknown. The drug produced no effects at assessed doses of up to 15 mg. Higher doses were not tested. It is unknown whether F-22 is active.

== Chemistry ==
=== Synthesis ===
The chemical synthesis of F-22 has been described.

=== Analogues ===
Analogues of F-22 include DOiB, 6-APDB, MMDA-2, F (F-1), and F-2, among others.

== History ==
F-22 was first described in the scientific literature by Alexander Shulgin in 1978. Subsequently, it was described in greater detail by Shulgin in his book PiHKAL (Phenethylamines I Have Known and Loved) in 1991. Shulgin briefly alluded to F and its derivatives in a paper in 1971.

== Society and culture ==
=== Legal status ===
==== United Kingdom ====
This substance is a Class A drug in the Drugs controlled by the UK Misuse of Drugs Act.

== See also ==
- Substituted benzofuran
