= 3,5-Dimethoxyallylbenzene =

Names
- IUPAC name 1,3-dimethoxy-5-prop-2-enylbenzene
- Other names 3,5-Dimethoxyphenylprop-2-ene

Identifiers
CAS Number	64118-89-4
3D model (JSmol)	Interactive image
ChEBI	CHEBI:81334
ChemSpider	457658
KEGG	C17782
PubChem CID	524874
CompTox Dashboard (EPA)	DTXSID50335374
- InChI: InChI=1S/C11H14O2/c1-4-5-9-6-10(12-2)8-11(7-9)13-3/h4,6-8H,1,5H2,2-3H3 Key: NOYCNNBWHOVQFR-UHFFFAOYSA-N
- SMILES: COC1=CC(=CC(=C1)CC=C)OC

Properties
Chemical formula	C_{11}H_{14}O_{2}
Molar mass	178.231 g·mol^{−1}
- Except where otherwise noted, data are given for materials in their standard state (at 25 °C [77 °F], 100 kPa). Infobox references

3,5-Dimethoxyallylbenzene is a naturally occurring allylbenzene alkaloid found in artemisia (mugwort) and sage. In his book PiHKAL (Phenethylamines I Have Known and Loved), Alexander Shulgin noted that it can serve as a precursor in the chemical synthesis of the unexplored but possibly psychoactive amphetamine 3,5-dimethoxyamphetamine (3,5-DMA). 3,5-Dimethoxyallylbenzene has been reported to act as a very weak 15-lipoxygenase (15-LOX; ALOX15) inhibitor (IC_{50} = 43,200 nM).

== See also ==
- Substituted allylbenzene
- PiHKAL § Essential amphetamines
