= F-2 (drug) =

Psychedelic drug

Clinical data
- Other names: 6-(2-Aminopropyl)-5-methoxy-2-methyl-2,3-dihydrobenzofuran; Benzofuran-2-methyl-5-methoxy-6-(2-aminopropane); 2-Me-5-MeO-6-APDB
- Routes of administration: Oral
- Drug class: Serotonergic psychedelic; Hallucinogen
- ATC code: None

Legal status
- Legal status: CA: Schedule I; UK: Class A

Pharmacokinetic data
- Duration of action: Unknown

Identifiers
- IUPAC name: 1-(5-methoxy-2-methyl-2,3-dihydro-1-benzofuran-6-yl)propan-2-amine
- CAS Number: 99355-74-5
- PubChem CID: 13056773
- ChemSpider: 21106309
- UNII: 75S5T5T7QX
- ChEMBL: ChEMBL102877

Chemical and physical data
- Formula: C_{13}H_{19}NO_{2}
- Molar mass: 221.300 g·mol^{−1}
- 3D model (JSmol): Interactive image
- SMILES: C1=C2C(=CC(=C1CC(C)N)OC)CC(O2)C
- InChI: InChI=1S/C13H19NO2/c1-8(14)4-10-7-13-11(5-9(2)16-13)6-12(10)15-3/h6-9H,4-5,14H2,1-3H3; Key:XBHKBTCXRYPZMX-UHFFFAOYSA-N

F-2, also known as 6-(2-aminopropyl)-5-methoxy-2-methyl-2,3-dihydrobenzofuran or as benzofuran-2-methyl-5-methoxy-6-(2-aminopropane), is a chemical compound and possible psychedelic drug of the phenethylamine, amphetamine, and benzofuran families. It is the derivative of 6-APDB with a methyl group at the 2 position and a methoxy group at the 5 position of the benzofuran ring system.

== Use and effects ==
In his book PiHKAL (Phenethylamines I Have Known and Loved), Alexander Shulgin lists F-2's dose as greater than 15 mg orally and its duration as unknown. The drug produced no effects at assessed doses of up to 15 mg. Higher doses were not tested. It is unknown whether F-2 is active. On the other hand, David E. Nichols reported in 1981, via personal communication with Shulgin and M. Trampota in 1980, that F-2 was "shown to possess clinical activity".

== Pharmacology ==
=== Pharmacodynamics ===
F-2 has been found to substitute for the psychedelic drug DOM in drug discrimination tests in rats. However, it was about 40-fold less potent than DOM in this regard, requiring a dose of 5 mg/kg. For comparison, F-2 was tested in humans at doses of only up to 0.2 mg/kg. In contrast to the case of rats, F-2 at doses of up to 100 mg/kg intraperitoneally in mice was without effects. A dose of 150 mg/kg intraperitoneally in mice was lethal.

== Chemistry ==
=== Synthesis ===
The chemical synthesis of F-2 has been described.

=== Analogues ===
Analogues of F-2 include DOPR, 6-APDB, MMDA-2, F (F-1), and F-22, among others.

== History ==
F-2 was first described in the scientific literature by David E. Nichols in 1981 via personal communication with Alexander Shulgin and M. Trampota in 1980. Subsequently, it was described in greater detail by Nichols and colleagues in 1986 and 1991 and by Shulgin in his book PiHKAL (Phenethylamines I Have Known and Loved) in 1991. Shulgin briefly alluded to F and its derivatives in a paper in 1971.

== Society and culture ==
=== Legal status ===
==== United Kingdom ====
This substance is a Class A drug in the Drugs controlled by the UK Misuse of Drugs Act.

== See also ==
- Substituted benzofuran
