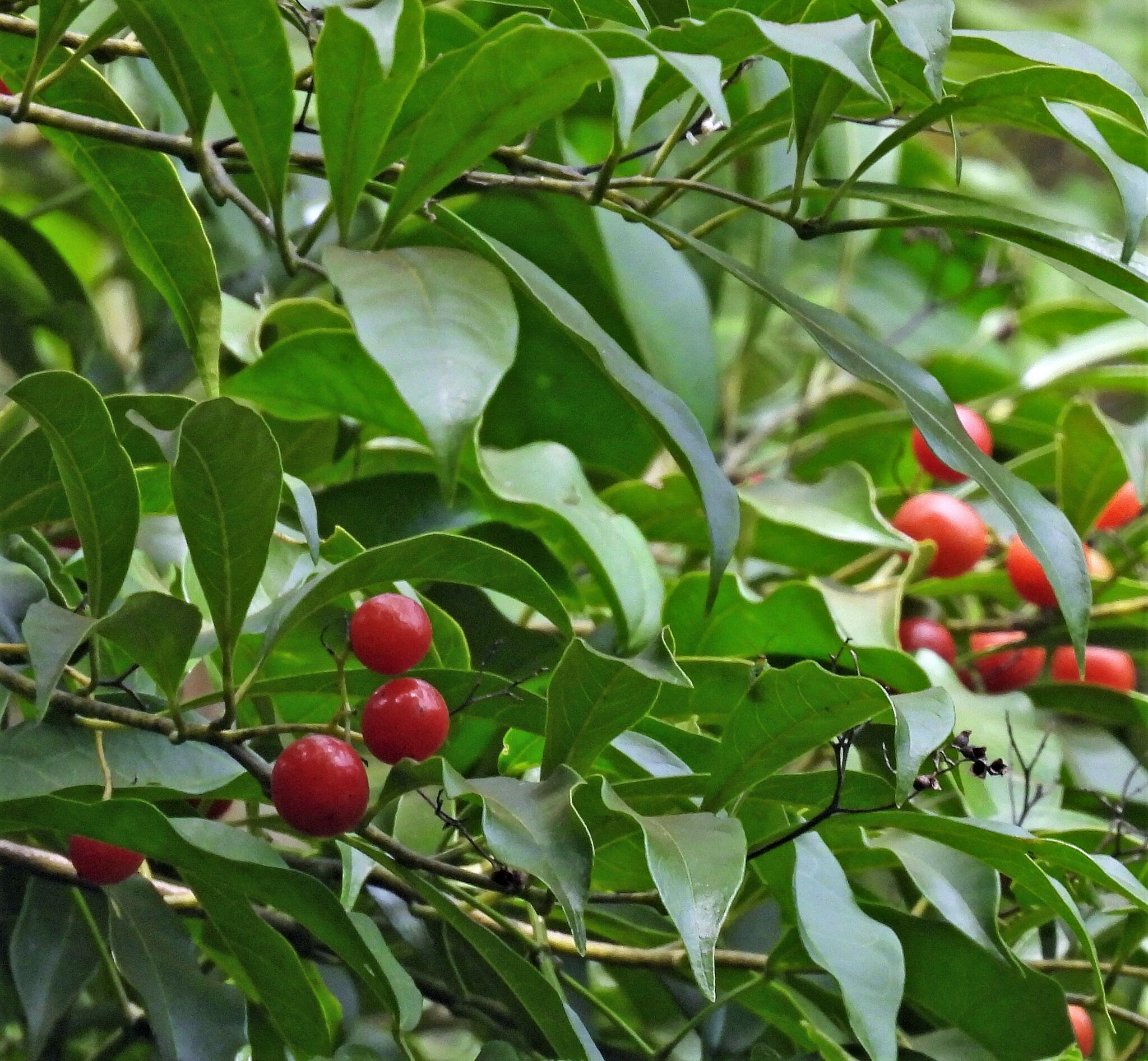
- In Iguazú Department, Argentina

Scientific classification
- Kingdom: Plantae
- Clade: Tracheophytes
- Clade: Angiosperms
- Clade: Eudicots
- Clade: Asterids
- Order: Boraginales
- Family: Cordiaceae
- Genus: Cordia
- Species: C. ecalyculata

Binomial name
- Cordia ecalyculata Vell.

Synonyms
- List: Cordia coffeoides Warm.; Cordia digynia Vell.; Cordia glaziovii (Mez) Taub.; Cordia leptocaula Fresen.; Cordia roxburghii C.B.Clarke; Cordia salicifolia Cham.; Gerascanthus ecalyculatus (Vell.) Borhidi; Gerascanthus glaziovii (Mez ex Taub.) Borhidi; Gerascanthus roxburghii (C.B.Clarke) Borhidi; Gerascanthus salicifolius (Cham.) Borhidi; Lithocardium leptocaulon (Fresen.) Kuntze; Lithocardium roxburghii (C.B.Clarke) Kuntze; Lithocardium salicifolium (Cham.) Kuntze; Patagonica glaziovii Mez ex Taub.; Patagonula glaziovii Mez

= Cordia ecalyculata =

Tree species in the borage family

Cordia ecalyculata, also called Cordia salicifolia and chá de bugre, is a species of evergreen flowering tree in the family Cordiaceae, that occurs mainly in Brazil and is used as a medicinal plant. Its red fruit, which resembles a coffee bean and contains caffeine, is roasted and brewed as a coffee substitute.

== Description ==
Cordia ecalyculata is a large shrub or small tree usually measuring 3–15 meters (10–49 ft) in height, but on occasion reaching 20 m (66 ft). They have somewhat gray bark that is fairly smooth, but with small cracks both along and across the length of the trunk. The leaves are evergreen and hairless. They may be elliptic-lanceolate or lanceolate in shape and measure 3–13 cm (1.2–5.1 in) long by 1–6 cm (0.4–2.4 in) long.

The tree has inflorescences made up of loosely packed cymes of flowers. The flowers are hairless and white. They have a tube about 4–5 millimeters long that flairs outward into five rounded lobes. Each flower has five stamens. The fruit is egg shaped to mostly round, red in color, and has one seed. It flowers in summer and produces fruit in the fall.

Birds that feed on the fruits of Cordia ecalyculata include guans, trogons, pigeons, tanagers, and aracaris.

== Taxonomy ==
Cordia ecalyculata was scientifically described in 1829 by José Mariano de Conceição Vellozo. He also described a second species in the same year, Cordia digynia, which is regarded as a heterotypic synonym. Similarly Cordia salicifolia described by Adelbert von Chamisso, also described in 1829, is also regarded as a synonym but not identical to Cordia ecalyculata.

=== Names ===
In Argentina this species is known by the common names Colita and gomita. In Brazil it is known as café-de-bugre, cha-de-bugre, chá-de-frade, claraiba, cutiera, louro-mole, and louro-salgueiro. In English it is known as ecalyculate cordia.

Cordia ecalyculata should not be confused with two other plants that have been called chá de bugre, Hedyosmum brasiliense and Pimenta pseudocaryophyllus.

== Distribution and habitat ==
Cordia ecalyculata is native to south eastern Brazil, Paragua, and north eastern Argentina.

== Uses ==
The fruits of Cordia ecalyculata contain caffeine and are roasted and brewed to be used as a coffee substitute. It is also used as a traditional medicine in the Brazilian states of Minas Gerais, Bahia, Goias, and Acre. Extracts from the plant are sold commercially in Brazil diuretic, as an appetite suppressant, and for weight loss. It has also shown some usefulness as a snakebite antivenom.
