= Ψ-2C-T-4 =

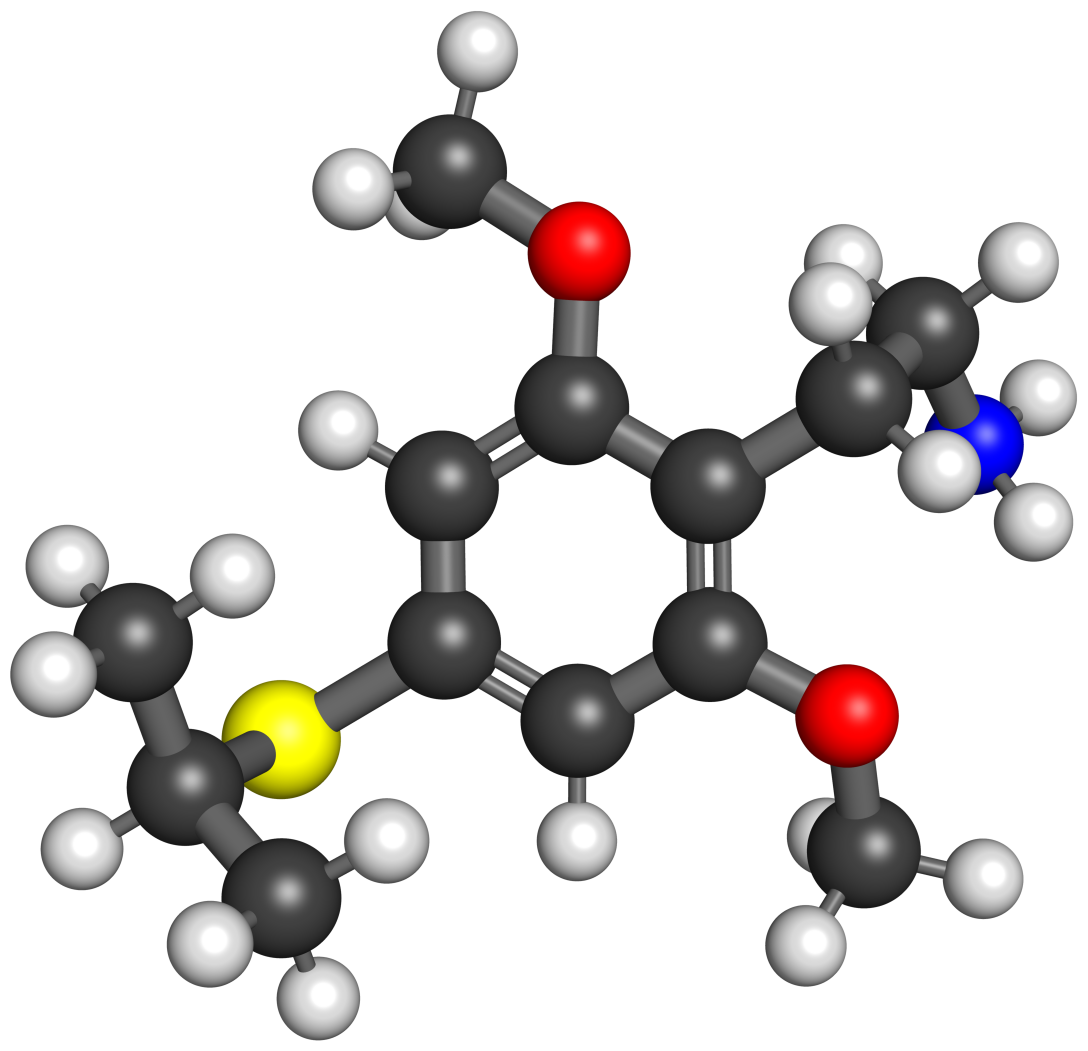

Clinical data
- Other names: psi-2C-T-4; 4-Isopropylthio-2,6-dimethoxyphenethylamine; 2,6-Dimethoxy-4-isopropylthiophenethylamine
- Routes of administration: Oral
- Drug class: Serotonergic psychedelic; Hallucinogen
- ATC code: None

Pharmacokinetic data
- Duration of action: Unknown

Identifiers
- IUPAC name: 2-(2,6-dimethoxy-4-propan-2-ylsulfanylphenyl)ethanamine
- CAS Number: 952006-71-2
- PubChem CID: 44719521
- ChemSpider: 23553027
- UNII: SNV8XM36Y8

Chemical and physical data
- Formula: C_{13}H_{21}NO_{2}S
- Molar mass: 255.38 g·mol^{−1}
- 3D model (JSmol): Interactive image
- SMILES: CC(C)SC1=CC(=C(C(=C1)OC)CCN)OC
- InChI: InChI=1S/C13H21NO2S/c1-9(2)17-10-7-12(15-3)11(5-6-14)13(8-10)16-4/h7-9H,5-6,14H2,1-4H3; Key:UMQKLDOKCOSGCS-UHFFFAOYSA-N

Ψ-2C-T-4, or psi-2C-T-4, also known as 4-isopropylthio-2,6-dimethoxyphenethylamine, is a psychedelic drug of the phenethylamine and Ψ-PEA families. It is a positional isomer of 2C-T-4 (4-isopropylthio-2,5-dimethoxyphenethylamine).

According to Alexander Shulgin in his book PiHKAL (Phenethylamines I Have Known and Loved), Ψ-2C-T-4 produced short-lasting threshold psychoactive effects at doses of 8 to 12 mg orally. Higher doses were not assessed and its effective dose range has not been determined. In a subsequent review, Shulgin stated that it was active at doses in the "10 to 20 mg range" but that more study was required to establish its dose range and effects.

The chemical synthesis of Ψ-2C-T-4 has been described.

The drug was first described in the scientific literature by Shulgin by 1991 and was further briefly described by him in 2003. It is a controlled substance in Canada under phenethylamine blanket-ban language.

== See also ==
- Substituted methoxyphenethylamine
- Ψ-PEA (psychedelics)
- Ψ-DOM
- Ψ-TMA-2 (TMA-6)
