= MPM (drug) =

Clinical data
- Other names: 4-Propoxy-2,5-dimethoxyamphetamine; 2,5-Dimethoxy-4-propoxyamphetamine; TMA2-4-PrO
- Routes of administration: Oral
- Drug class: Serotonin 5-HT_{2} receptor agonist
- ATC code: None

Pharmacokinetic data
- Duration of action: "Probably short"

Identifiers
- IUPAC name: 1-(2,5-dimethoxy-4-propoxyphenyl)propan-2-amine
- CAS Number: 123643-24-3
- PubChem CID: 57417446
- ChemSpider: 472038
- UNII: GQ9W2YQT2W
- CompTox Dashboard (EPA): DTXSID501027167

Chemical and physical data
- Formula: C_{14}H_{23}NO_{3}
- Molar mass: 253.342 g·mol^{−1}
- 3D model (JSmol): Interactive image
- SMILES: COc1cc(OC)c(cc1OCCC)CC(C)N
- InChI: InChI=1S/C14H23NO3/c1-5-6-18-14-8-11(7-10(2)15)12(16-3)9-13(14)17-4/h8-10H,5-7,15H2,1-4H3; Key:FTJOFRCENIVFLC-UHFFFAOYSA-N

MPM, also known as 2,5-dimethoxy-4-propoxyamphetamine or as TMA2-4-PrO, is a possible psychedelic drug of the phenethylamine, amphetamine, and DOx families. It is a derivative of the DOx psychedelics TMA-2 and MEM in which the 4-position substituent has been extended. The drug is also the α-methyl or amphetamine analogue of 2C-O-7.

== Use and effects ==
In his book PiHKAL (Phenethylamines I Have Known and Loved), Alexander Shulgin lists MPM's dose range as 30 mg or more orally and its duration as "probably short". The drug produced weak or threshold effects at doses of 15 to 30 mg. In another publication, Shulgin estimated an effective dose of MPM to be around 50 mg and the drug as being around half as potent as TMA-2 or MEM.

== Pharmacology ==
=== Pharmacodynamics ===
MPM produces the head-twitch response, a behavioral proxy of psychedelic effects, in rodents. It shows about the same potency as TMA-2 and MEM in this test.

== Chemistry ==
=== Synthesis ===
The chemical synthesis of MPM has been described.

=== Analogues ===
Analogues of MPM include TMA-2, MEM, MIPM, MALM, MBM, and MAM, among others.

== History ==
MPM was first described in the scientific literature by Shulgin in 1978. Subsequently, Shulgin described the drug in more detail in his book PiHKAL. The compound's name is said to derive from its benzene ring substituents, "methoxy propoxy methoxy".

== Society and culture ==
=== Legal status ===
==== Canada ====
MPM is a controlled substance in Canada under phenethylamine blanket-ban language.

== See also ==
- DOx (psychedelics)
- MEM § Derivatives
- Proscaline
- 3C-P
- 2C-T-7
