= 3-Hydroxy-4-methoxyamphetamine =

Clinical data
- Other names: 4-Methoxy-3-hydroxyamphetamine
- ATC code: None

Identifiers
- IUPAC name: 5-(2-aminopropyl)-2-methoxyphenol
- CAS Number: 52336-47-7
- PubChem CID: 12611606
- ChemSpider: 16816977
- ChEMBL: ChEMBL174723
- CompTox Dashboard (EPA): DTXSID20504333

Chemical and physical data
- Formula: C_{10}H_{15}NO_{2}
- Molar mass: 181.235 g·mol^{−1}
- 3D model (JSmol): Interactive image
- SMILES: CC(CC1=CC(=C(C=C1)OC)O)N
- InChI: InChI=1S/C10H15NO2/c1-7(11)5-8-3-4-10(13-2)9(12)6-8/h3-4,6-7,12H,5,11H2,1-2H3; Key:IHPFVQVCJHQPFN-UHFFFAOYSA-N

3-Hydroxy-4-methoxyamphetamine is an amphetamine and a known metabolite of the entactogen MDMA in rodents and humans. The essential oil analogues and precursors are chavibetol and isochavibetol, and can be converted into 3-hydroxy-4-methoxyamphetamine via amination.

== See also ==
- Substituted amphetamine
- Substituted methoxyphenethylamine
- 3-Hydroxy-4-methoxyphenethylamine (HMPEA)
- 4-Hydroxy-3-methoxyamphetamine (HMA)
- 3,4-Dihydroxyamphetamine (HHA; α-methyldopamine)
- 3,4-Dimethoxyamphetamine (DMA)
- para-Methoxyamphetamine (PMA)
- Gepefrine (3-hydroxyamphetamine)
