= Ψ-2C-DFMO =

Clinical data
- Other names: ψ-2C-O-35; 4-Difluoromethoxy-2,6-dimethoxyphenethylamine
- Routes of administration: Oral
- Drug class: Serotonergic psychedelic; Hallucinogen
- ATC code: None

Pharmacokinetic data
- Duration of action: ~18 hours

Identifiers
- IUPAC name: 2-[4-(difluoromethoxy)-2,6-dimethoxyphenyl]ethan-1-amine

Chemical and physical data
- Formula: C_{11}H_{15}F_{2}NO_{3}
- Molar mass: 247.242 g·mol^{−1}
- 3D model (JSmol): Interactive image
- SMILES: NCCc1c(OC)cc(cc1OC)OC(F)F
- InChI: InChI=1S/C11H15F2NO3/c1-15-9-5-7(17-11(12)13)6-10(16-2)8(9)3-4-14/h5-6,11H,3-4,14H2,1-2H3; Key:MOGVICJGCUEFKA-UHFFFAOYSA-N

Ψ-2C-DFMO, also known as ψ-2C-O-35 or as 4-difluoromethoxy-2,6-dimethoxyphenethylamine, is a psychedelic drug of the phenethylamine and ψ-phenethylamine families. It is the phenethylamine (α-demethyl) analogue of ψ-DODFMO and is also structurally related to other psychedelics like difluoromescaline (DFM) and 2C-T-35 (2C-T-DFM). The drug has been found to be active at a dose of 17 mg orally, with moderately intense effects and a relatively long duration of around 18 hours. Ψ-2C-DFMO was first described in the scientific literature by Daniel Trachsel in 2012. It is a controlled substance in Canada under phenethylamine blanket-ban language.

== See also ==
- ψ-Phenethylamine
- ψ-DODFMO
- Difluoromescaline (DFM)
- 2C-T-35 (2C-T-DFM)
