= 3-Hydroxy-4-methoxyphenethylamine =

Clinical data
- Other names: HMPEA; HMPE; 4-O-Methyldopamine; p-O-Methyldopamine; 4-Methoxy-meta-tyramine; 4-Methoxy-m-tyramine; 4-Methoxy-3-tyramine
- ATC code: None

Identifiers
- IUPAC name: 5-(2-aminoethyl)-2-methoxyphenol
- CAS Number: 3213-30-7 645-33-0 (hydrochloride)
- PubChem CID: 1748
- ChemSpider: 1685
- UNII: 62MI76A89G
- ChEBI: CHEBI:89641
- ChEMBL: ChEMBL1492473
- CompTox Dashboard (EPA): DTXSID90954003
- ECHA InfoCard: 100.313.736

Chemical and physical data
- Formula: C_{9}H_{13}NO_{2}
- Molar mass: 167.208 g·mol^{−1}
- 3D model (JSmol): Interactive image
- SMILES: COC1=C(C=C(C=C1)CCN)O
- InChI: InChI=1S/C9H13NO2/c1-12-9-3-2-7(4-5-10)6-8(9)11/h2-3,6,11H,4-5,10H2,1H3; Key:WJXQFVMTIGJBFX-UHFFFAOYSA-N

3-Hydroxy-4-methoxyphenethylamine (HMPEA), also known as 4-O-methyldopamine or 4-methoxy-meta-tyramine, is a phenethylamine alkaloid naturally found in certain cactus species such as Pachycereus pecten-aboriginum. It is a known minor metabolite of levodopa (L-DOPA) and dopamine in humans. It has been reported to produce cytotoxicity in vitro and was once proposed as a dopaminergic neurotoxin in parkinsonism. The chemical synthesis of 3-hydroxy-4-methoxyphenethylamine has been described.

== See also ==
- Substituted phenethylamine
- Catecholamine
- 3-Hydroxy-4-methoxyamphetamine
- 3-Methoxytyramine (3-Methoxy-4-hydroxyphenethylamine)
- 3,4-Dimethoxyphenethylamine
