= PiHKAL =

1991 book by Alexander Shulgin and Ann Shulgin

PiHKAL: A Chemical Love Story
- Cover of PiHKAL, 1st ed.
- Author: Alexander and Ann Shulgin
- Subject: Pharmacology, Autobiography, Psychoactive drugs
- Publisher: Transform Press
- Publication date: 1991
- Publication place: United States
- Media type: Paperback
- Pages: 978
- ISBN: 0-9630096-0-5
- OCLC: 269100404
- Followed by: TiHKAL (1997)

PiHKAL: A Chemical Love Story, also known as Phenethylamines I Have Known and Loved, is a book by Alexander Shulgin and Ann Shulgin published in 1991. The subject of the work is psychoactive phenethylamine chemical derivatives, notably those that act as psychedelics and/or entactogens. The book has two halves, with the second part containing detailed entries on 179 phenethylamines. PiHKAL was followed by TiHKAL: The Continuation (Tryptamines I Have Known and Loved) (1997).

== Content ==
The book is arranged into two parts, the first part being a fictionalized autobiography of the couple and the second part describing 179 different psychedelic compounds (most of which Shulgin discovered himself), including detailed synthesis instructions, bioassays, doses, durations, and other commentary.

The second part was made freely available by Shulgin on Erowid while the first part is available only in the printed text. While the reactions described are beyond the ability of people with a basic chemistry education, some tend to emphasize techniques that do not require difficult-to-obtain chemicals. Notable among these are the use of mercury-aluminium amalgam (an unusual but easy to obtain reagent) as a reducing agent and detailed suggestions on legal plant sources of important drug precursors such as safrole.

Members of Shulgin's research group who contributed to the experience reports included Shulgin himself, Ann Shulgin, Myron Stolaroff, Jean Stolaroff, Darrell Lemaire, and Peyton Jacob III, among others.

== Response ==
Through PiHKAL (and later TiHKAL), Shulgin sought to ensure that his discoveries would escape the limits of professional research labs and find their way to the public, a goal consistent with his stated beliefs that psychedelic drugs can be valuable tools for self-exploration. The MDMA ("ecstasy") synthesis published in PiHKAL remains one of the most common clandestine methods of its manufacture to this day. Many countries have banned the major substances for which this book gives directions for synthesis, such as 2C-B, 2C-T-2, and 2C-T-7.

In 1994, two years after PiHKAL was published, the Drug Enforcement Administration (DEA) raided Shulgin's laboratory and requested that he surrender his DEA license. Richard Meyer, spokesman for DEA's San Francisco Field Division, has stated in reference to PiHKAL "It is our opinion that those books are pretty much cookbooks on how to make illegal drugs. Agents tell me that in clandestine labs that they have raided, they have found copies of those books", suggesting that the publication of PiHKAL and the termination of Shulgin's license may have been related.

== Notable compounds ==
Some compounds in PiHKAL, like mescaline, DOM, 2C-B, MDA, and MDMA, are widely used or known psychedelics or entactogens.

=== Magical half-dozen ===
The so-called "magical half-dozen" refers to Shulgin's self-rated most important psychedelic phenethylamines, all of which except mescaline he developed and synthesized himself. They are found within the first book of PiHKAL, and are as follows:

- 2C-B (2,5-dimethoxy-4-bromophenethylamine)
- 2C-E (2,5-dimethoxy-4-ethylphenethylamine)
- 2C-T-2 (2,5-dimethoxy-4-ethylthiophenethylamine)
- 2C-T-7 (2,5-dimethoxy-4-propylthiophenethylamine)
- DOM (2,5-dimethoxy-4-methylamphetamine)
- Mescaline (3,4,5-trimethoxyphenethylamine)

All six are now Schedule I controlled substances in the United States.

=== Essential amphetamines ===
The "essential amphetamines" are what Shulgin describes as ten amphetamines that differ from essential oil natural products such as safrole or myristicin by the presence of an amine group. The list consists of the following amphetamines (with essential oil analogues listed after):

1. PMA (para-methoxyamphetamine) – estragole or anethole (anise camphor, isoestragole)
2. 3,4-DMA (3,4-dimethoxyamphetamine) – methyleugenol or methylisoeugenol
3. MDA (3,4-methylenedioxyamphetamine) – safrole or isosafrole
4. MMDA (3-methoxy-4,5-methylendioxyamphetamine) – myristicin or isomyristicin
5. MMDA-3a (2-methoxy-3,4-methylendioxyamphetamine) – croweacin or isocroweacin
6. TMA (3,4,5-trimethoxyamphetamine) – elemicin or isoelemicin
7. TMA-2 (2,4,5-trimethoxyamphetamine) – γ-asarone (euasarone, sekishone) or asarone
8. DMMDA (2,5-dimethoxy-3,4-methylenedioxyamphetamine) – apiole or isoapiole
9. DMMDA-2 (2,3-dimethoxy-4,5-methylenedioxyamphetamine) – dillapiole or isodillapiole
10. TeMA (2,3,4,5-tetramethoxyamphetamine) – allyltetramethoxybenzene or isoallyltetramethoxybenzene

The following additional essential amphetamines are also described (with essential oil analogues listed after as well):

- HMA (4-hydroxy-3-methoxyamphetamine) – eugenol or isoeugenol
- 3-Hydroxy-4-methoxyamphetamine – chavibetol or isochavibetol
- 2,4-DMA (2,4-dimethoxyamphetamine) – osmorhizole or isoosmorrhizole (nothosmyrnol)
- 3,5-DMA (3,5-dimethoxyamphetamine) – 3,5-dimethoxyallylbenzene or 3,5-dimethoxyisoallylbenzene
- MMDA-2 (2-methoxy-4,5-methylendioxyamphetamine) – asaricin or carpacin

Not all of the essential amphetamines were bioassayed in PiHKAL, with some merely mentioned.

=== Ten classic ladies ===
Shulgin systematically replaced the ten unique hydrogen atoms in DOM with methyl groups in order to explore its structure–activity relationships (SAR) and named these compounds the "ten classic ladies". The resulting compounds were as follows:

- Ariadne (α-desmethyl-α-ethyl-DOM)
- Beatrice (N-methyl-DOM)
- Charmian (α-methyl-DOM)
- Daphne (threo-β-methyl-DOM)
- Elvira (erythro-β-methyl-DOM)
- Florence (2-desmethoxy-2-ethoxy-DOM; DOM-2-EtO)
- Ganesha (3-methyl-DOM)
- Hecate (DOET; 4-desmethyl-4-ethyl-DOM)
- Iris (5-desmethoxy-5-ethoxy-DOM; DOM-5-EtO)
- Juno (6-methyl-DOM)

As with the essential amphetamines, not all of these compounds have been bioassayed.

Some additional "ladies" have also since been named, including Julia (DOTMA; 3,6-dimethyl-DOM), Jelena (2C-IP), and Selene (2C-P).

== Phenethylamines listed ==
#	Substance	Chemical name	Group	Dose^{a}	Duration	Link
1	AEM (α-ethylmescaline)	α-Ethyl-3,4,5-trimethoxy-PEA	4C-scaline	>220 mg	Unknown	
2	AL (allylescaline)	4-Allyloxy-3,5-dimethoxy-PEA	Scaline	20–35 mg	8–12 hours	
3	ALEPH (DOT, para-DOT)	4-Methylthio-2,5-dimethoxy-A	DOx	5–10 mg	6–8 hours	
4	ALEPH-2	4-Ethylthio-2,5-dimethoxy-A	DOx	4–8 mg	8–16 hours	
5	ALEPH-4	4-Isopropylthio-2,5-dimethoxy-A	DOx	7–12 mg	12–20 hours	
6	ALEPH-6	4-Phenylthio-2,5-dimethoxy-A	DOx	>40 mg	"Probably long"	
7	ALEPH-7	4-Propylthio-2,5-dimethoxy-A	DOx	4–7 mg	15–30 hours	
8	ARIADNE (4C-D; Dimoxamine)	2,5-Dimethoxy-α-ethyl-4-methyl-PEA	4C	Unknown^{b}	Short	
9	ASB (asymbescaline)	3,4-Diethoxy-5-methoxy-PEA	Scaline (mod.)	200–280 mg	10–15 hours	
10	B (buscaline)	4-Butoxy-3,5-dimethoxy-PEA	Scaline	>150 mg	"Several hours"	
11	BEATRICE (N-methyl-DOM)	2,5-Dimethoxy-4,N-dimethyl-A	DOx	>30 mg	6–10 hours	
12	Bis-TOM (2,5-dithio-DOM)	2,5-Bismethylthio-4-methyl-A	Thio-DOx	>160 mg	Unknown	
13	BOB (β-methoxy-2C-B)	4-Bromo-2,5,β-trimethoxy-PEA	BOx, 2C	10–20 mg	10–20 hours	
14	BOD (β-methoxy-2C-D)	2,5,β-Trimethoxy-4-methyl-PEA	BOx, 2C	15–25 mg	8–16 hours	
15	BOH (β-methoxy-MDPEA)	β-Methoxy-3,4-methylenedioxy-PEA	BOx, MDxx	80–120 mg	6–8 hours	
16	BOHD (β-hydroxy-2C-D)	2,5-Dimethoxy-β-hydroxy-4-methyl-PEA	BOx, 2C	>50 mg	Unknown	
17	BOM (β-methoxymescaline)	3,4,5,β-Tetramethoxy-PEA	BOx, scaline	>200 mg	Unknown	
18	4-Br-3,5-DMA	4-Bromo-3,5-dimethoxy-A	3C-desoxyscaline	4–10 mg	8–12 hours	
19	2-Br-4,5-MDA	2-Bromo-4,5-methylenedioxy-A	MDxx	350 mg	Unknown	
20	2C-B	4-Bromo-2,5-dimethoxy-PEA	2C	12–24 mg	4–8 hours	
21	3C-BZ (3C-benzscaline)	4-Benzyloxy-3,5-dimethoxy-A	3C-scaline	25–200 mg	18–24 hours	
22	2C-C	4-Chloro-2,5-dimethoxy-PEA	2C	20–40 mg	4–8 hours	
23	2C-D	4-Methyl-2,5-dimethoxy-PEA	2C	20–60 mg	4–6 hours	
24	2C-E	4-Ethyl-2,5-dimethoxy-PEA	2C	10–25 mg	8–12 hours	
25	3C-E (3C-escaline)	4-Ethoxy-3,5-dimethoxy-A	3C-scaline	30–60 mg	8–12 hours	
26	2C-F	4-Fluoro-2,5-dimethoxy-PEA	2C	>250 mg	Unknown	
27	2C-G	3,4-Dimethyl-2,5-dimethoxy-PEA	2C	20–35 mg	18–30 hours	
28	2C-G-3	3,4-Trimethylene-2,5-dimethoxy-PEA	2C (mod.)	16–25 mg	12–24 hours	
29	2C-G-4	3,4-Tetramethylene-2,5-dimethoxy-PEA	2C (mod.)	Unknown	Unknown	
30	2C-G-5	3,4-Norbornyl-2,5-dimethoxy-PEA	2C (mod.)	10–16 mg	32–48 hours	
31	2C-G-N	1,4-Dimethoxynaphthyl-2-ethylamine	2C (mod.)	20–40 mg	20–30 hours	
32	2C-H (2,5-DMPEA)	2,5-Dimethoxy-PEA	2C	Unknown	Unknown	
33	2C-I	4-Iodo-2,5-dimethoxy-PEA	2C	14–22 mg	6–10 hours	
34	2C-N	4-Nitro-2,5-dimethoxy-PEA	2C	100–150 mg	4–6 hours	
35	2C-O-4	4-Isopropoxy-2,5-dimethoxy-PEA	2C	>60 mg	Unknown	
36	2C-P	4-Propyl-2,5-dimethoxy-PEA	2C	6–10 mg	10–16 hours	
37	CPM (cyclopropylmescaline)	4-Cyclopropylmethoxy-3,5-dimethoxy-PEA	Scaline	60–80 mg	12–18 hours	
38	2C-Se	4-Methylseleno-2,5-dimethoxy-PEA	2C	~100 mg	6–8 hours	
39	2C-T	4-Methylthio-2,5-dimethoxy-PEA	2C	60–100 mg	3–5 hours	
40	2C-T-2	4-Ethylthio-2,5-dimethoxy-PEA	2C	12–25 mg	6–8 hours	
41	2C-T-4	4-Isopropylthio-2,5-dimethoxy-PEA	2C	8–20 mg	12–18 hours	
42	Psi-2C-T-4 (ψ-2C-T-4)	4-Isopropylthio-2,6-dimethoxy-PEA	ψ-PEA	>12 mg	"Probably short"	
43	2C-T-7	4-Propylthio-2,5-dimethoxy-PEA	2C	10–30 mg	8–15 hours	
44	2C-T-8	4-Cyclopropylmethylthio-2,5-dimethoxy-PEA	2C	30–50 mg	10–15 hours	
45	2C-T-9	4-(t)-Butylthio-2,5-dimethoxy-PEA	2C	60–100 mg	12–18 hours	
46	2C-T-13	4-(2-Methoxyethylthio)-2,5-dimethoxy-PEA	2C	25–40 mg	6–8 hours	
47	2C-T-15	4-Cyclopropylthio-2,5-dimethoxy-PEA	2C	>30 mg	"Several hours"	
48	2C-T-17	4-(s)-Butylthio-2,5-dimethoxy-PEA	2C	60–100 mg	10–15 hours	
49	2C-T-21	4-(2-Fluoroethylthio)-2,5-dimethoxy-PEA	2C	8–12 mg	7–10 hours	
50	4-D (4-trideuteromescaline)	4-Trideuteromethyl-3,5-dimethoxy-PEA	Scaline	~200–400 mg^{c}	12 hours	
51	Beta-D (β,β-dideuteromescaline)	β,β-Dideutero-3,4,5-trimethoxy-PEA	Scaline	~200–400 mg^{c}	12 hours	
52	DESOXY (4-desoxymescaline)	4-Methyl-3,5-dimethoxy-PEA	Desoxyscaline	40–120 mg	6–8 hours	
53	2,4-DMA	2,4-Dimethoxy-A	Other	>60 mg	"Short"	
54	2,5-DMA (DOH)	2,5-Dimethoxy-A	DOx	80–160 mg	6–8 hours	
55	3,4-DMA (DMA)	3,4-Dimethoxy-A	Other	"A few [100 mg]"	Unknown	
56	DMCPA	2,5-Dimethoxy-4-methyl-PCPA	DOx (mod.)	15–20 mg	4–8 hours	
57	DME (β-hydroxy-3,4-DMPEA)	3,4-Dimethoxy-β-hydroxy-PEA	BOx, other	>115 mg	Unknown	
58	DMMDA (2,5-dimethoxy-MDA)	2,5-Dimethoxy-3,4-methylenedioxy-A	MDxx	30–75 mg	6–8 hours	
59	DMMDA-2 (5,6-dimethoxy-MDA)	2,3-Dimethoxy-4,5-methylenedioxy-A	MDxx	~50 mg	Unknown	
60	DMPEA (3,4-DMPEA)	3,4-Dimethoxy-PEA	Other	>1,000 mg	Unknown	
61	DOAM	4-Amyl-2,5-dimethoxy-A	DOx	>10 mg	Unknown	
62	DOB	4-Bromo-2,5-dimethoxy-A	DOx	1–3 mg	18–30 hours	
63	DOBU	4-Butyl-2,5-dimethoxy-A	DOx	Uncertain	"Very long"	
64	DOC	4-Chloro-2,5-dimethoxy-A	DOx	1.5–3 mg	12–24 hours	
65	DOEF	4-(2-Fluoroethyl)-2,5-dimethoxy-A	DOx	2–3.5 mg	12–16 hours	
66	DOET	4-Ethyl-2,5-dimethoxy-A	DOx	2–6 mg	14–20 hours	
67	DOI	4-Iodo-2,5-dimethoxy-A	DOx	1.5–3 mg	16–30 hours	
68	DOM (STP)	4-Methyl-2,5-dimethoxy-A	DOx	3–10 mg	14–20 hours	
69	Psi-DOM (ψ-DOM)	4-Methyl-2,6-dimethoxy-A	ψ-PEA	15–25 mg	6–8 hours	
70	DON	4-Nitro-2,5-dimethoxy-A	DOx	3–4.5 mg	8–15 hours	
71	DOPR	4-Propyl-2,5-dimethoxy-A	DOx	2.5–5 mg	20–30 hours	
72	E (escaline)	4-Ethoxy-3,5-dimethoxy-PEA	Scaline	40–60 mg	8–12 hours	
73	EEE (TMA2-2,4,5-TriEtO)	2,4,5-Triethoxy-A	DOx-TWEETIO	Unknown	Unknown	
74	EEM (TMA2-2,4-DiEtO)	2,4-Diethoxy-5-methoxy-A	DOx-TWEETIO	Unknown	Unknown	
75	EME (TMA2-2,5-DiEtO)	2,5-Diethoxy-4-methoxy-A	DOx-TWEETIO	Unknown	Unknown	
76	EMM (TMA2-2-EtO)	2-Ethoxy-4,5-dimethoxy-A	DOx-TWEETIO	>50 mg	Unknown	
77	ETHYL-J (EBDB)	N,α-Diethyl-3,4-methylenedioxy-PEA	MDxx	>90 mg	"Probably short"	
78	ETHYL-K (EBDP)	N-Ethyl-α-propyl-3,4-methylenedioxy-PEA	MDxx	>40 mg	Unknown	
79	F-2 (2-Me-5-MeO-6-APDB)	2-Methyl-5-methoxy-2,3-dihydro-6-APBF	Benzofuran	>15 mg	Unknown	
80	F-22 (2,2-DiMe-5-MeO-6-APDB)	2,2-Dimethyl-5-methoxy-2,3-dihydro-6-APBF	Benzofuran	>15 mg	Unknown	
81	FLEA (MDMOH)	N-Hydroxy-N-methyl-3,4-methylenedioxy-A	MDxx	100–160 mg	4–8 hours	
82	G-3	3,4-Trimethylene-2,5-dimethoxy-A	DOx (mod.)	12–18 mg	8–12 hours	
83	G-4	3,4-Tetramethylene-2,5-dimethoxy-A	DOx (mod.)	Unknown	Unknown	
84	G-5	3,4-Norbornyl-2,5-dimethoxy-A	DOx (mod.)	14–20 mg	16–30 hours	
85	GANESHA (G; 3-methyl-DOM)	3,4-Dimethyl-2,5-dimethoxy-A	DOx	20–32 mg	18–24 hours	
86	G-N	1,4-Dimethoxynaphthyl-2-isopropylamine	DOx (mod.)	Unknown	Unknown	
87	HOT-2 (N-hydroxy-2C-T-2)	2,5-Dimethoxy-N-hydroxy-4-ethylthio-PEA	HOT-x, 2C	10–18 mg	6–10 hours	
88	HOT-7 (N-hydroxy-2C-T-7)	2,5-Dimethoxy-N-hydroxy-4-(n)-propylthio-PEA	HOT-x, 2C	15–25 mg	6–8 hours	
89	HOT-17 (N-hydroxy-2C-T-17)	2,5-Dimethoxy-N-hydroxy-4-(s)-butylthio-PEA	HOT-x, 2C	70–120 mg	12–18 hours	
90	IDNNA (N,N-dimethyl-DOI)	2,5-Dimethoxy-N,N-dimethyl-4-iodo-A	DOx	>2.6 mg	Unknown	
91	IM (isomescaline)	2,3,4-Trimethoxy-PEA	Scaline (mod.)	>400 mg	Unknown	
92	IP (isoproscaline)	3,5-Dimethoxy-4-isopropoxy-PEA	Scaline (mod.)	40–80 mg	10–16 hours	
93	IRIS (DOM-5-EtO)	5-Ethoxy-2-methoxy-4-methyl-A	DOx-TWEETIO	>9 mg	Unknown	
94	J (BDB)	α-Ethyl-3,4-methylenedioxy-PEA	MDxx	150–230 mg	4–8 hours	
95	LOPHOPHINE (MMDPEA)	3-Methoxy-4,5-methylenedioxy-PEA	MDxx	>200 mg	Unknown	
96	M (mescaline; 3,4,5-TMPEA)	3,4,5-Trimethoxy-PEA	Scaline	~200–400 mg^{c}	10–12 hours	
97	4-MA (PMA)	4-Methoxy-A	Other	50–80 mg	"Short"	
98	MADAM-6 (6-methyl-MDMA)	2,N-Dimethyl-4,5-methylenedioxy-A	MDxx	>280 mg	Unknown	
99	MAL (methallylescaline)	3,5-Dimethoxy-4-methallyloxy-PEA	Scaline	40–65 mg	12–16 hours	
100	MDA	3,4-Methylenedioxy-A	MDxx	80–160 mg	4–6 hours^{d}	
101	MDAL	N-Allyl-3,4-methylenedioxy-A	MDxx	>180 mg	Unknown	
102	MDBU	N-Butyl-3,4-methylenedioxy-A	MDxx	>40 mg	Unknown	
103	MDBZ	N-Benzyl-3,4-methylenedioxy-A	MDxx	>150 mg	Unknown	
104	MDCPM	N-Cyclopropylmethyl-3,4-methylenedioxy-A	MDxx	>10 mg	Unknown	
105	MDDM	N,N-Dimethyl-3,4-methylenedioxy-A	MDxx	>150 mg	Unknown	
106	MDE (MDEA)	N-Ethyl-3,4-methylenedioxy-A	MDxx	100–200 mg	3–5 hours	
107	MDHOET	N-(2-Hydroxyethyl)-3,4-methylenedioxy-A	MDxx	>50 mg	Unknown	
108	MDIP	N-Isopropyl-3,4-methylenedioxy-A	MDxx	>250 mg	Unknown	
109	MDMA	N-Methyl-3,4-methylenedioxy-A	MDxx	80–150 mg	4–6 hours	
110	MDMC (EDMA)	N-Methyl-3,4-ethylenedioxy-A	EDxx	≥200 mg	3–5 hours	
111	MDMEO	N-Methoxy-3,4-methylenedioxy-A	MDxx	>180 mg	Unknown	
112	MDMEOET	N-(2-Methoxyethyl)-3,4-methylenedioxy-A	MDxx	>180 mg	Unknown	
113	MDMP	α,α,N-Trimethyl-3,4-methylenedioxy-PEA	MDxx	~110 mg	~6 hours	
114	MDOH	N-Hydroxy-3,4-methylenedioxy-A	MDxx	100–160 mg	3–6 hours	
115	MDPEA	3,4-Methylenedioxy-PEA	MDxx	>300 mg	Unknown	
116	MDPH	α,α-Dimethyl-3,4-methylenedioxy-PEA	MDxx	160–240 mg	3–5 hours	
117	MDPL	N-Propargyl-3,4-methylenedioxy-A	MDxx	>150 mg	Unknown	
118	MDPR	N-Propyl-3,4-methylenedioxy-A	MDxx	>200 mg	Unknown	
119	ME (metaescaline)	3,4-Dimethoxy-5-ethoxy-PEA	Scaline (mod.)	200–350 mg	8–12 hours	
120	MEDA (5-methoxy-EDA)	3-Methoxy-4,5-ethylenedioxy-A	EDxx	>200 mg	Unknown	
121	MEE (TMA2-4,5-DiEtO)	2-Methoxy-4,5-diethoxy-A	DOx-TWEETIO	>4.6 mg	Unknown	
122	MEM (TMA2-4-EtO)	2,5-Dimethoxy-4-ethoxy-A	DOx	20–50 mg	10–14 hours	
123	MEPEA	3-Methoxy-4-ethoxy-PEA	Other	≥300 mg	"Short"	
124	Meta-DOB	5-Bromo-2,4-dimethoxy-A	DOx (mod.)	50–100 mg	5–6 hours	
125	Meta-DOT (5-thio-TMA-2)	5-Methylthio-2,4-dimethoxy-A	Thio-DOx	>35 mg	Unknown	
126	Methyl-DMA (N-methyl-2,5-DMA)	N-Methyl-2,5-dimethoxy-A	DOx	>250 mg	Unknown	
127	Methyl-DOB (N-methyl-DOB)	4-Bromo-2,5-dimethoxy-N-methyl-A	DOx	>8 mg	"Probably long"	
128	Methyl-J (MBDB)	N-Methyl-α-ethyl-3,4-methylenedioxy-PEA	MDxx	180–210 mg	4–6 hours	
129	Methyl-K (MBDP)	N-Methyl-α-propyl-3,4-methylenedioxy-PEA	MDxx	>100 mg	Unknown	
130	Methyl-MA (PMMA)	N-Methyl-4-methoxy-A	Other	>100 mg	"Short"	
131	Methyl-MMDA-2 (6-methoxy-MDMA)	N-Methyl-2-methoxy-4,5-methylenedioxy-A	MDxx	>70 mg	Unknown	
132	MMDA (5-methoxy-MDA)	3-Methoxy-4,5-methylenedioxy-A	MDxx	100–250 mg	"Moderate"	
133	MMDA-2 (6-methoxy-MDA)	2-Methoxy-4,5-methylenedioxy-A	MDxx	25–50 mg	8–12 hours	
134	MMDA-3a (2-methoxy-MDA)	2-Methoxy-3,4-methylenedioxy-A	MDxx	20–80 mg	10–16 hours	
135	MMDA-3b (4-methoxy-2,3-MDA)	4-Methoxy-2,3-methylenedioxy-A	MDxx	>80 mg	Unknown	
136	MME (TMA2-5-EtO)	2,4-Dimethoxy-5-ethoxy-A	DOx-TWEETIO	≥40 mg	~6–10 hours	
137	MP (metaproscaline)	3,4-Dimethoxy-5-propoxy-PEA	Scaline (mod.)	>240 mg	Unknown	
138	MPM (TMA2-4-PrO)	2,5-Dimethoxy-4-propoxy-A	DOx	≥30 mg	"Probably short"	
139	Ortho-DOT (2-thio-TMA-2)	2-Methylthio-4,5-dimethoxy-A	Thio-DOx	>25 mg	Unknown	
140	P (proscaline)	3,5-Dimethoxy-4-propoxy-PEA	Scaline	30–60 mg	8–12 hours	
141	PE (phenescaline)	3,5-Dimethoxy-4-phenethyloxy-PEA	Scaline	>150 mg	Unknown	
142	PEA (phenethylamine)	PEA	Other	>1,600 mg	Unknown	
143	PROPYNYL (propynylscaline)	4-Propynyloxy-3,5-dimethoxy-PEA	Scaline	≥80 mg	8–12 hours	
144	SB (symbescaline)	3,5-Diethoxy-4-methoxy-PEA	Scaline (mod.)	>240 mg	Unknown	
145	TA (TeMA)	2,3,4,5-Tetramethoxy-A	Other	>~50 mg	Unknown	
146	3-TASB (3-thioasymbescaline)	4-Ethoxy-3-ethylthio-5-methoxy-PEA	Thioscaline (mod.)	~160 mg	10–18 hours	
147	4-TASB (4-thioasymbescaline)	3-Ethoxy-4-ethylthio-5-methoxy-PEA	Thioscaline (mod.)	60–100 mg	10–15 hours	
148	5-TASB (5-thioasymbescaline)	3,4-Diethoxy-5-methylthio-PEA	Thioscaline (mod.)	~160 mg	~8 hours	
149	TB (thiobuscaline)	4-Thiobutoxy-3,5-dimethoxy-PEA	Thioscaline	60–120 mg	~8 hours	
150	3-TE (3-thioescaline)	4-Ethoxy-5-methoxy-3-methylthio-PEA	Thioscaline	60–80 mg	8–12 hours	
151	4-TE (4-thioescaline)	3,5-Dimethoxy-4-ethylthio-PEA	Thioscaline	20–30 mg	9–12 hours	
152	2-TIM (2-thioisomescaline)	2-Methylthio-3,4-dimethoxy-PEA	Thioscaline (mod.)	>240 mg	Unknown	
153	3-TIM (3-thioisomescaline)	3-Methylthio-2,4-dimethoxy-PEA	Thioscaline (mod.)	>240 mg	Unknown	
154	4-TIM (4-thioisomescaline)	4-Methylthio-2,3-dimethoxy-PEA	Thioscaline (mod.)	>160 mg	Unknown	
155	3-TM (3-thiomescaline)	3-Methylthio-4,5-dimethoxy-PEA	Thioscaline	60–100 mg	8–12 hours	
156	4-TM (4-thiomescaline)	4-Methylthio-3,5-dimethoxy-PEA	Thioscaline	20–40 mg	10–15 hours	
157	TMA (α-methylmescaline; 3C-M)	3,4,5-Trimethoxy-A	3C-scaline	100–250 mg	6–8 hours	
158	TMA-2 (DOMeO)	2,4,5-Trimethoxy-A	DOx	20–40 mg	8–12 hours	
159	TMA-3 (α-methylisomescaline)	2,3,4-Trimethoxy-A	Other	>100 mg	Unknown	
160	TMA-4	2,3,5-Trimethoxy-A	Other	>80 mg	~6 hours	
161	TMA-5	2,3,6-Trimethoxy-A	Other	≥30 mg	8–10 hours	
162	TMA-6 (ψ-TMA-2)	2,4,6-Trimethoxy-A	ψ-PEA	25–50 mg	12–16 hours	
163	3-TME (3-thiometaescaline)	4,5-Dimethoxy-3-ethylthio-PEA	Thioscaline (mod.)	60–100 mg	10–15 hours	
164	4-TME (4-thiometaescaline)	3-Ethoxy-5-methoxy-4-methylthio-PEA	Thioscaline (mod.)	60–100 mg	10–15 hours	
165	5-TME (5-thiometaescaline)	3-Ethoxy-4-methoxy-5-methylthio-PEA	Thioscaline (mod.)	>200 mg	Unknown	
166	2T-MMDA-3a (2-methylthio-MDA)	2-Methylthio-3,4-methylenedioxy-A	MDxx	>12 mg	Unknown	
167	4T-MMDA-2 (4-thio-MMDA-2)	4,5-Thiomethyleneoxy-2-methoxy-A	MDxx (mod.)	>25 mg	Unknown	
168	TMPEA (2,4,5-TMPEA; 2C-O)	2,4,5-Trimethoxy-PEA	2C	>300 mg	Unknown	
169	2-TOET (2-thio-DOET)	4-Ethyl-5-methoxy-2-methylthio-A	Thio-DOx	>65 mg	Unknown	
170	5-TOET (5-thio-DOET)	4-Ethyl-2-methoxy-5-methylthio-A	Thio-DOx	12–25 mg	8–24 hours	
171	2-TOM (2-thio-DOM)	5-Methoxy-4-methyl-2-methylthio-A	Thio-DOx	60–100 mg	8–10 hours	
172	5-TOM (5-thio-DOM)	2-Methoxy-4-methyl-5-methylthio-A	Thio-DOx	30–50 mg	6–10 hours	
173	TOMSO (5-TOM-sulfoxide)	2-Methoxy-4-methyl-5-methylsulfinyl-A	Thio-DOx (mod.)	≥100–150 mg^{e}	10–16 hours	
174	TP (thioproscaline)	4-Propylthio-3,5-dimethoxy-PEA	Thioscaline	20–25 mg	10–15 hours	
175	TRIS (trisescaline)	3,4,5-Triethoxy-PEA	Scaline (mod.)	>240 mg	Unknown	
176	3-TSB (3-thiosymbescaline)	3-Ethoxy-5-ethylthio-4-methoxy-PEA	Thioscaline (mod.)	>200 mg	Unknown	
177	4-TSB (4-thiosymbescaline)	3,5-Diethoxy-4-methylthio-PEA	Thioscaline (mod.)	>240 mg	Unknown	
178	3-T-TRIS (3-thiotrisescaline)	4,5-Diethoxy-3-ethylthio-PEA	Thioscaline (mod.)	>160 mg	Unknown	
179	4-T-TRIS (4-thiotrisescaline)	3,5-Diethoxy-4-ethylthio-PEA	Thioscaline (mod.)	>200 mg	Unknown	
Acronyms (in chemical names): PEA = phenethylamine; A = amphetamine; PCPA = 2-phenylcyclopropylamine; 6-APBF = 6-(2-aminopropyl)benzofuran. Footnotes: ^{a} = Dose and duration for compounds are orally unless otherwise specified. ^{b} = Ariadne dose is as a psychedelic. Otherwise doses of 12–32 mg as the racemate and 25 mg as (R)-Ariadne were active. ^{c} = 4-D, beta-D, and mescaline doses are 200–400 mg as the sulfate salt and 178–356 mg as the hydrochloride salt. ^{d} = MDA duration was originally 8–12 hours but was later revised by Shulgin to 4–6 hours in September 2001 following the publication of PiHKAL. ^{e} = TOMSO dose is >150 mg alone or 100–150 mg with alcohol.

Many additional compounds are also discussed within the individual compound entries of PiHKAL, for instance the 2C TWEETIOs.

In addition to PiHKAL, Shulgin has also described the properties of psychedelic phenethylamines in humans in literature reviews.

== Censorship ==
In December 2025, the Lukashenko regime added the book to the List of printed publications containing information materials, the distribution of which could harm the national interests of Belarus.

== See also ==
- Bibliography of Alexander Shulgin
- List of psychedelic literature
- TiHKAL (Tryptamines I Have Known and Loved) (1997)
- The Shulgin Index, Volume One: Psychedelic Phenethylamines and Related Compounds (2011)
- Phenethylamine: Von der Struktur zur Funktion (2013)
- Substituted phenethylamine (PEA)
- Substituted methoxyphenethylamine
- Substituted amphetamine (AMPH)
- Substituted methylenedioxyphenethylamine (MDxx)
- 2C, DOx, 4C, scaline, 3C, Ψ-PEA, 25-NB, FLY
