= Tetramethoxyallylbenzene =

Names
- IUPAC name 1,2,3,4-tetramethoxy-5-prop-2-enylbenzene
- Preferred IUPAC name 1,2,3,4-Tetramethoxy-5-(prop-2-en-1-yl)benzene

Identifiers
CAS Number	15361-99-6
ChEBI	CHEBI:70354
ChEMBL	ChEMBL464585
ChemSpider	536429
PubChem CID	617233
UNII	2444643WXK
CompTox Dashboard (EPA)	DTXSID401026592 DTXSID30347016, DTXSID401026592
- InChI: InChI=1S/C13H18O4/c1-6-7-9-8-10(14-2)12(16-4)13(17-5)11(9)15-3/h6,8H,1,7H2,2-5H3 Key: HRAXJWRHSUTMCS-UHFFFAOYSA-N

Properties
Chemical formula	C_{13}H_{18}O_{4}
Molar mass	238.283 g·mol^{−1}
Appearance	Solid
Melting point	25 °C (77 °F; 298 K)
Boiling point	307 to 309 °C (585 to 588 °F; 580 to 582 K)
- Except where otherwise noted, data are given for materials in their standard state (at 25 °C [77 °F], 100 kPa). Infobox references

2,3,4,5-Tetramethoxyallylbenzene also known as allyltetramethoxybenzene (or 1-allyl-2,3,4,5-tetramethoxybenzene), as well as methoxyelemicin, it is a phenylpropene, a natural organic compound found in the essential oils of several plant species, used as a precursor in the chemical synthesis of 2,3,4,5-tetramethoxyamphetamine.

Tetramethoxyallylbenzene is found in parsley essential oil at a concentration of 4%–13%, along with apiole and myristicin. The primary source is the leaf essential oil of the plant Polyalthia johnsonii, from which 79% of tetramethoxyallylbenzene was isolated along with elemicin. Tetramethoxyallylbenzene was detected in the essential oil of Heracleum persicum. It was found in varying amounts depending on the plant's development stage: it was detected at 0.7 ± 0.1% during the vegetative stage, reached a maximum of 3.0 ± 0.3% during the full flowering stage, and was found in trace amounts during the flower bud and early seed development stages.

== See also ==
- PiHKAL § Essential amphetamines
