= Croweacin =

Names
- IUPAC name 4-methoxy-5-prop-2-enyl-1,3-benzodioxole
- Other names 2-Methoxy-3,4-methylenedioxyphenylprop-2-ene

Identifiers
CAS Number	484-34-4
3D model (JSmol)	Interactive image
ChemSpider	4475271
PubChem CID	5316141
UNII	WS97V62VOQ
- InChI: InChI=1S/C11H12O3/c1-3-4-8-5-6-9-11(10(8)12-2)14-7-13-9/h3,5-6H,1,4,7H2,2H3 Key: VGXJTTXSNPYTSK-UHFFFAOYSA-N
- SMILES: COC1=C(C=CC2=C1OCO2)CC=C

Properties
Chemical formula	C_{11}H_{12}O_{3}
Molar mass	192.214 g·mol^{−1}
- Except where otherwise noted, data are given for materials in their standard state (at 25 °C [77 °F], 100 kPa). Infobox references

Croweacin is a naturally occurring allylbenzene and benzodioxole alkaloid found in Eriostemon crowei. Alexander Shulgin noted in his 1991 book PiHKAL (Phenethylamines I Have Known and Loved) that it can serve as a precursor in the chemical synthesis of the psychedelic amphetamine MMDA-3a, though Shulgin expressed that it is not a practical precursor. The synthesis of croweacin itself and its aldehyde have also been described. The compound was first described in the scientific literature by 1938.

== See also ==
- Substituted allylbenzene
- PiHKAL § Essential amphetamines
- Myristicin (a positional isomer)
