= Osmorhizole =

Names
- IUPAC name 2,4-dimethoxy-1-prop-2-enylbenzene
- Other names 2,4-Dimethoxyphenylprop-2-ene

Identifiers
CAS Number	3698-23-5
3D model (JSmol)	Interactive image
ChEBI	CHEBI:173832
ChemSpider	2340972
PubChem CID	3083821
UNII	A2J2TKC7B4
- InChI: InChI=1S/C11H14O2/c1-4-5-9-6-7-10(12-2)8-11(9)13-3/h4,6-8H,1,5H2,2-3H3 Key: HZLYHZSHPUFYAR-UHFFFAOYSA-N
- SMILES: COC1=CC(=C(C=C1)CC=C)OC

Properties
Chemical formula	C_{11}H_{14}O_{2}
Molar mass	178.231 g·mol^{−1}
- Except where otherwise noted, data are given for materials in their standard state (at 25 °C [77 °F], 100 kPa). Infobox references

Osmorhizole is a naturally occurring allylbenzene alkaloid found in carrot-like vegetables. In his book PiHKAL (Phenethylamines I Have Known and Loved), Alexander Shulgin noted that it can serve as a precursor in the chemical synthesis of the stimulant and possible psychedelic amphetamine 2,4-dimethoxyamphetamine (2,4-DMA).

== See also ==
- Substituted allylbenzene
- PiHKAL § Essential amphetamines
