= Allylbenzene =

Names
- Preferred IUPAC name (Prop-2-enyl)benzene
- Other names 3-Phenyl-1-propene; 2-Propenylbenzene

Identifiers
CAS Number	300-57-2
3D model (JSmol)	Interactive image
ChEMBL	ChEMBL501879
ChemSpider	8950
ECHA InfoCard	100.005.542
EC Number	206-095-7
PubChem CID	9309
UNII	3VT7C9MEQ9
CompTox Dashboard (EPA)	DTXSID00861855
- InChI: InChI=1S/C9H10/c1-2-6-9-7-4-3-5-8-9/h2-5,7-8H,1,6H2 Key: HJWLCRVIBGQPNF-UHFFFAOYSA-N
- SMILES: C=CCC1=CC=CC=C1

Properties
Chemical formula	C_{9}H_{10}
Molar mass	118.179 g·mol^{−1}
Appearance	Colorless liquid
Density	0.893 g/cm^{3}
Melting point	−40 °C (−40 °F; 233 K)
Boiling point	156 °C (313 °F; 429 K)

Hazards
- Occupational safety and health (OHS/OSH)
Main hazards	Flammable liquid and vapor, May be fatal if swallowed and enters airways
- GHS labelling
Pictograms	(GHS02: Flammable) (GHS08: Health hazard)
Signal word	Danger
Hazard statements	H226, H304
Precautionary statements	P210, P233, P240, P241, P242, P243, P280, P301+P316, P303+P361+P353, P331, P370+P378, P403+P235, P405, P501
- Except where otherwise noted, data are given for materials in their standard state (at 25 °C [77 °F], 100 kPa). Infobox references

Allylbenzene or 3-phenylpropene is an organic compound with the formula C_{6}H_{5}CH_{2}CH=CH_{2}. It is a colorless liquid. The compound consists of a phenyl group attached to an allyl group. Allylbenzene isomerizes to trans-propenylbenzene.

In plant biochemistry, the allylbenzene skeleton is the parent (simplest representation) of many phenylpropanoids. Known allylbenzenes include eugenol, safrole, elemicin, myristicin, apiole, dillapiole, chavicol, sarisan, croweacin, osmorhizole, exalatacin, chavibetol and many others.
