= 2,4,5-Trimethoxyphenethylamine =

2C-O

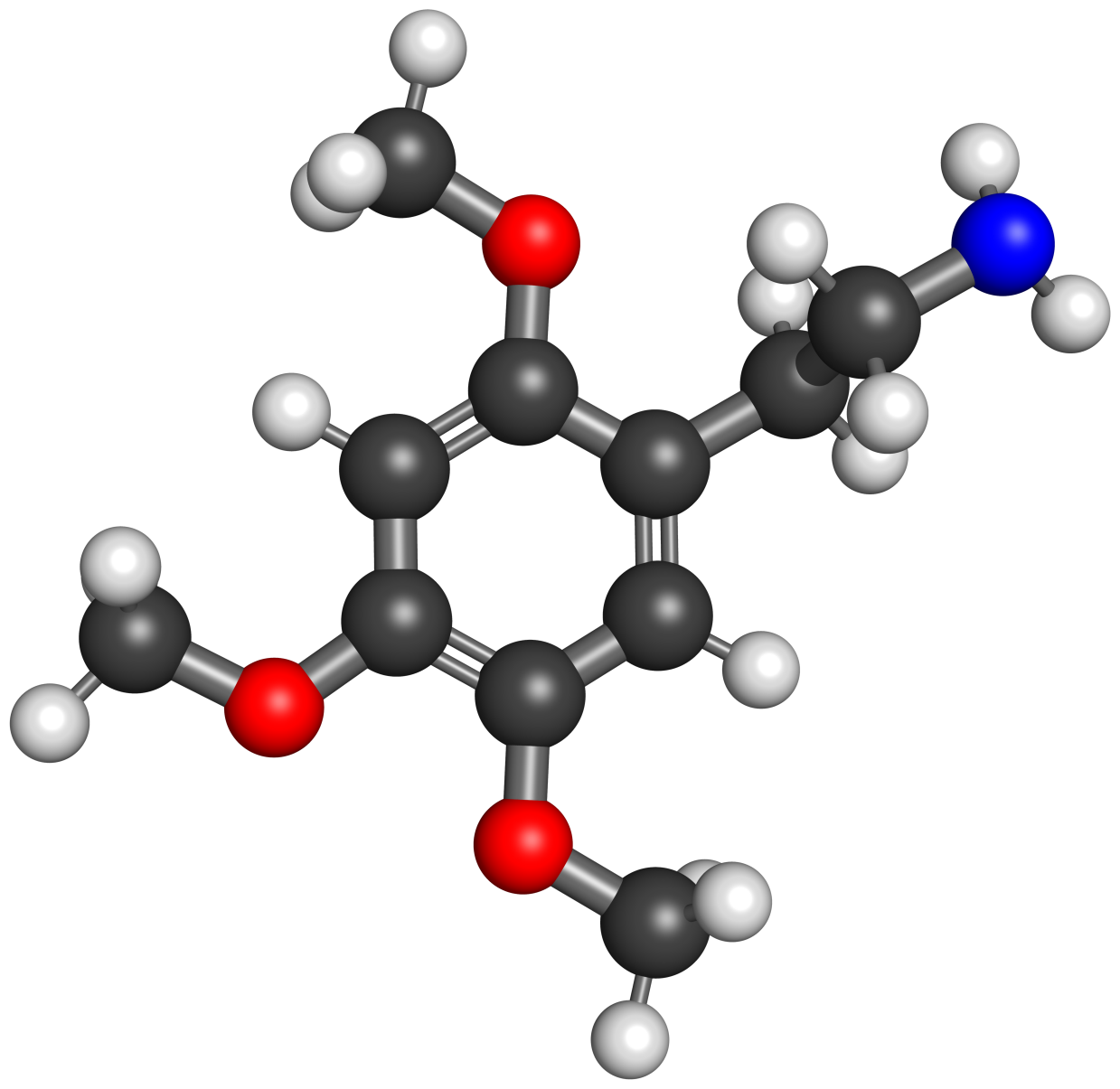

Clinical data
- Other names: 2,4,5-TMPEA; TMPEA-2; TMPEA; 4-Methoxy-2,5-dimethoxyphenethylamine; 2,5-Dimethoxy-4-methoxyphenethylamine; 2C-O; 2C-OMe; 2C-MeO; 2C-TMA-2; 25O
- Routes of administration: Oral, injection
- Drug class: Serotonin receptor agonist; Serotonin 5-HT_{2} receptor agonist
- ATC code: None

Legal status
- Legal status: CA: Schedule III; UK: Class A; US: Schedule I (isomer of mescaline)

Pharmacokinetic data
- Duration of action: Unknown

Identifiers
- IUPAC name: 2-(2,4,5-trimethoxyphenyl)ethan-1-amine
- CAS Number: 15394-83-9
- PubChem CID: 151954
- ChemSpider: 133931
- UNII: S27QYQ708U
- ChEMBL: ChEMBL354924
- CompTox Dashboard (EPA): DTXSID30165499

Chemical and physical data
- Formula: C_{11}H_{17}NO_{3}
- Molar mass: 211.261 g·mol^{−1}
- 3D model (JSmol): Interactive image
- Melting point: 187 to 188 °C (369 to 370 °F)
- SMILES: O(c1cc(c(OC)cc1OC)CCN)C
- InChI: InChI=1S/C11H17NO3/c1-13-9-7-11(15-3)10(14-2)6-8(9)4-5-12/h6-7H,4-5,12H2,1-3H3; Key:GKATTZLSNLYADI-UHFFFAOYSA-N

2C-O, also known as 2,4,5-trimethoxyphenethylamine (2,4,5-TMPEA) or TMPEA-2, is a serotonin receptor modulator of the phenethylamine and 2C families. It is a positional isomer of the natural entheogen mescaline (3,4,5-trimethoxyphenethylamine) and is the α-desmethyl analogue of 2,4,5-trimethoxyamphetamine (TMA-2). The drug is the parent compound of the 2C-O series of drugs. 2C-O appears to be inactive in terms of psychoactive effects in humans, at least at doses that have been assessed. In any case, it is a low-potency full agonist of the serotonin 5-HT_{2} receptors in vitro, including of the serotonin 5-HT_{2A} receptor. 2C-O was first described by Max Jansen in 1931 and was further described by Alexander Shulgin in his 1991 book PiHKAL (Phenethylamines I Have Known and Loved).

== Use and effects ==
2C-O at a dose of under 300 mg by injection was reported to produce similar psychedelic effects as mescaline by Max Jansen in 1931, albeit with more nausea and no euphoria. Conversely, in a subsequent report described by Alexander Shulgin, it was said to be indistinguishable from placebo at a dose of up to 300 mg orally. The drug was also combined with the monoamine oxidase inhibitor (MAOI) harmaline, which acts as a reversible inhibitor of monoamine oxidase A (RIMA). Even with a dose of 150 mg harmaline and 200 mg 2C-O orally however, there were no additional hallucinogenic effects that could not be explained by harmaline alone.

According to Shulgin, the present-day consensus is that 2C-O by itself is inactive. In PiHKAL (Phenethylamines I Have Known and Loved), its dose is listed as greater than 300 mg orally and its duration as unknown. Although 2C-O does not seem to produce effects by itself, the drug at a dose of 200 mg orally was reported to strongly potentiate the action of 100 mg mescaline when employed as pretreatment 45 minutes prior to the administration of mescaline.

The apparent inactivity of 2C-O (2,4,5-trimethoxyphenethylamine) in humans has been described as enigmatic because 2C-O's amphetamine (α-methyl) counterpart 2,4,5-trimethoxyamphetamine (TMA-2) is active, and because the drug's positional isomer mescaline (3,4,5-trimethoxyphenethylamine) is also active.

== Pharmacology ==
2C-O has been found to act as full agonist of the serotonin 5-HT_{2A}, 5-HT_{2B}, and 5-HT_{2C} receptors. However, it showed more than two orders of magnitude lower potency in activating the serotonin 5-HT_{2A} receptor than 2C-B and 2C-I. On the other hand, 2C-O was similar in potency to mescaline as a serotonin 5-HT_{2A} receptor agonist, with EC_{50} values of 195 nM and 646 nM in terms of G_{q} signaling, respectively. The drug also showed higher efficacy than mescaline as a serotonin 5-HT_{2A} receptor agonist (E_{max} = 96–100% vs. 33–74%, respectively).

It has been said in the past that it is unclear whether the apparent inactivity of 2C-O is due to strong metabolism or low affinity and/or efficacy at the serotonin 5-HT_{2A} receptor. However, an in-vitro study using rabbit liver tissue found that 2C-O was deaminated 25% alone and 25% with the monoamine oxidase inhibitor (MAOI) semicarbazide after 1 hour whereas mescaline was deaminated 60% alone and 0% with semicarbazide after 1 hour. These findings suggest that 2C-O may be less susceptible to metabolism by monoamine oxidase (MAO) than mescaline. Moreover, it is now known that 2C-O shows far lower potency as a serotonin 5-HT_{2A} receptor agonist than other 2C drugs.

Although 2C-O and certain derivatives such as 2C-O-4 appear to be inactive or of low potency in humans, 2C-O derivatives show potent serotonin 5-HT_{2A} receptor agonism in vitro, and the amphetamine (α-methyl) analogue TMA-2, as well as derivatives like MEM, are potent psychedelics.

== Chemistry ==
2C-O, also known as 2,4,5-trimethoxyphenethylamine (2,4,5-TMPEA), is a substituted phenethylamine and 2C derivative.

=== Synthesis ===
The chemical synthesis of 2C-O has been described.

=== Analogues ===
Notable positional isomers of 2C-O (2,4,5-TMPEA) include mescaline (3,4,5-TMPEA) and Ψ-2C-O (2,4,6-TMPEA).

=== Derivatives ===
A variety of derivatives of 2C-O, named 2C-O-2 (4-ethoxy-2,5-dimethoxyphenethylamine) through 2C-O-27, have been developed and studied. A couple of notable derivatives are 2C-O-4 (4-isopropoxy-2,5-dimethoxyphenethylamine) and 2C-O-22 (4-ethoxy-2,5-dimethoxyphenethylamine).

25O-NBOMe is the N-(2-methoxybenzyl)- (NBOMe) derivative of 2C-O. It is far more potent as a serotonin 5-HT_{2} receptor agonist than 2C-O.

The tetramethoxyphenethylamines TeMPEA-1 (2,3,4,5-TeMPEA) and TeMPEA-3 (2,3,5,6-TeMPEA) as well as pentamethoxyphenethylamine (PeMPEA) are derivatives of 2C-O.

== History ==
2C-O was first described by Max Jansen in 1931 and was reported by him to produce psychedelic effects similar to those of mescaline. However, subsequent tests in the 1960s and 1970s, for instance by A. Dittrich and Alexander Shulgin, suggested that 2C-O is actually inactive as a psychedelic in animals and humans.

== Society and culture ==
=== Legal status ===
==== Canada ====
As of October 31, 2016, 2C-O is a controlled substance (Schedule III) in Canada.

==== United Kingdom ====
2C-O and all other compounds featured in PiHKAL are Class A drugs in the United Kingdom.

==== United States ====
2C-O is a Schedule I substance, as a positional isomer of mescaline.

== See also ==
- Trimethoxyphenethylamine
- 2C (psychedelics)
- Substituted methoxyphenethylamine
- 2,4,5-Trimethoxyamphetamine (2,4,5-TMA; TMA-2)
