= 2C-O-4 =

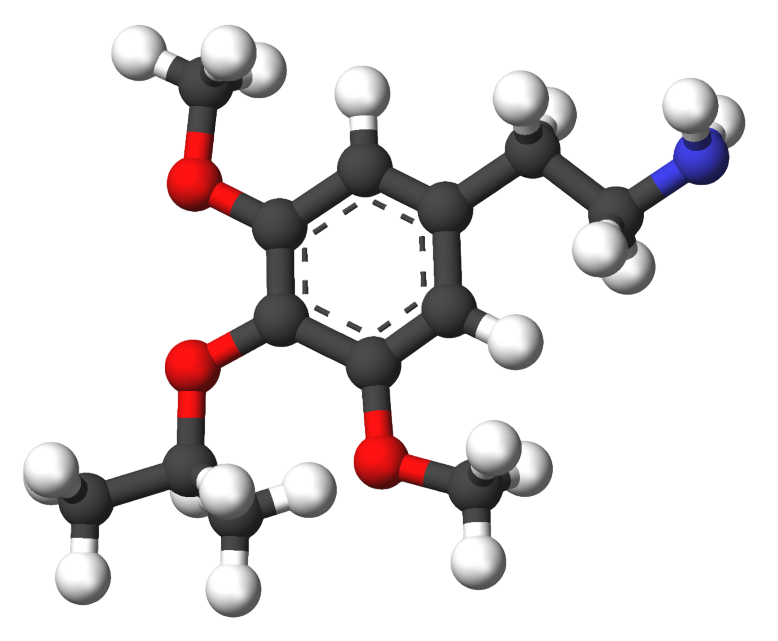

Clinical data
- Other names: 4-Isopropoxy-2,5-dimethoxyphenethylamine; 2,5-Dimethoxy-4-isopropoxyphenethylamine
- Routes of administration: Oral
- Drug class: Psychoactive drug
- ATC code: None

Pharmacokinetic data
- Duration of action: "A few hours"

Identifiers
- IUPAC name: 2-{2,5-Dimethoxy-4-[(propan-2-yl)oxy]phenyl}ethan-1-amine
- CAS Number: 952006-65-4
- PubChem CID: 44719510
- ChemSpider: 21106225
- UNII: 1GFL65O0VB
- CompTox Dashboard (EPA): DTXSID70894771

Chemical and physical data
- Formula: C_{13}H_{21}NO_{3}
- Molar mass: 239.315 g·mol^{−1}
- 3D model (JSmol): Interactive image
- SMILES: CC(C)Oc1cc(OC)c(cc1OC)CCN
- InChI: InChI=1S/C13H21NO3/c1-9(2)17-13-8-11(15-3)10(5-6-14)7-12(13)16-4/h7-9H,5-6,14H2,1-4H3; Key:KAKXJLWAEMHHTL-UHFFFAOYSA-N

2C-O-4, also known as 4-isopropoxy-2,5-dimethoxyphenethylamine, is a phenethylamine of the 2C family. It is also a positional isomer of isoproscaline and was probably first synthesized by Alexander Shulgin. It produces hallucinogenic or psychedelic effects. Because of the low potency of 2C-O-4, and the inactivity of 2C-O, Shulgin felt that the 2C-O series would not be an exciting area for research, and did not pursue any further analogues.

== Use and effects ==
Little is known about the psychopharmacological effects of 2C-O-4. Based on the one report available in his book PiHKAL (Phenethylamines I Have Known and Loved), Alexander Shulgin lists 2C-O-4's dose as being greater than 60 mg orally. At this dose, threshold psychoactive effects occurred. These included awareness of something in the front part of the head, yawning, physiological changes, and a general exhilaration and excitement. The effects lasted "a few hours" and were rated as a "plus-one" on the Shulgin Rating Scale. The drug was regarded as remaining to be fully explored.

== Pharmacology ==
=== Pharmacodynamics ===
The pharmacology of 2C-O-4 analogues has been studied.

== Chemistry ==
2C-O-4 is in a class of compounds commonly known as phenethylamines, and the systematic chemical name is 2-(4-isopropoxy-2,5-dimethoxyphenyl)ethanamine.

=== Synthesis ===
The chemical synthesis of 2C-O-4 has been described.

== History ==
2C-O-4 was first described in the literature by Alexander Shulgin in his book PiHKAL (Phenethylamines I Have Known and Loved) in 1991.

== Society and culture ==
=== Legal status ===
==== Canada ====
As of October 31, 2016, 2C-O-4 is a controlled substance (Schedule III) in Canada.

==== United States ====
2C-O-4 is unscheduled and unregulated in the United States; however, because of its close similarity in structure and effects to mescaline and 2C-T-7, possession and sale of 2C-O-4 may be subject to prosecution under the Federal Analog Act.

== See also ==
- 2C (psychedelics)
- 2C-O
- 2C-T-4
