= Gepefrine =

Sympathomimetic drug in the amphetamine family

3-Hydroxyamphetamine

Clinical data
- Trade names: Pressionorm, Wintonin
- Other names: 3-Hydroxyamphetamine; meta-Hydroxyamphetamine; α-Methyl-meta-tyramine; 3-Hydroxy-α-methylphenethylamine
- ATC code: C01CA15 (WHO)

Legal status
- Legal status: In general: ℞ (Prescription only)

Identifiers
- IUPAC name: (±)-3-(2-aminopropyl)phenol
- CAS Number: 1075-61-2; S-form: 18840-47-6
- PubChem CID: 219105
- DrugBank: DB13703
- ChemSpider: 189921
- UNII: L9JB0763SW; S-form: V51RRX51VH
- KEGG: D07150
- ChEMBL: ChEMBL2105064
- ECHA InfoCard: 100.012.779

Chemical and physical data
- Formula: C_{9}H_{13}NO
- Molar mass: 151.209 g·mol^{−1}
- 3D model (JSmol): Interactive image
- SMILES: OC1=CC(C[C@H](C)N)=CC=C1
- InChI: InChI=1S/C9H13NO/c1-7(10)5-8-3-2-4-9(11)6-8/h2-4,6-7,11H,5,10H2,1H3/t7-/m0/s1; Key:WTDGMHYYGNJEKQ-ZETCQYMHSA-N

Gepefrine, also known as 3-hydroxyamphetamine or α-methyl-meta-tyramine and sold under the brand names Pressionorm and Wintonin, is a sympathomimetic medication used as an antihypotensive agent which has been marketed in Germany.

== Pharmacology ==
Gepefrine is described as a sympathomimetic and antihypotensive agent.

== Chemistry ==
Gepefrine, also known as 3-hydroxy-α-methylphenethylamine or as 3-hydroxyamphetamine, is a substituted phenethylamine and amphetamine derivative. It is used pharmaceutically as the (S)-enantiomer and as the tartrate salt. Related compounds include meta-tyramine (3-hydroxyphenethylamine), 4-hydroxyamphetamine (norpholedrine), 3,4-dihydroxyamphetamine (α-methyldopamine), and metaraminol ((1R,2S)-3,β-dihydroxyamphetamine), among others.

== History ==
Gepefrine was synthesized by 1968 and was introduced for medical use in Germany by 1981.

== Society and culture ==
=== Names ===
Gepefrine is the generic name of the drug and its INN. Brand names of gepefrine include Pressionorm and Wintonin.

== Other drugs ==
Gepefrine is a known metabolite of amphetamine in rats.

== See also ==
- Substituted amphetamine
- 3-Hydroxy-4-methoxyamphetamine
