= MMDA (drug) =

Entactogen drug

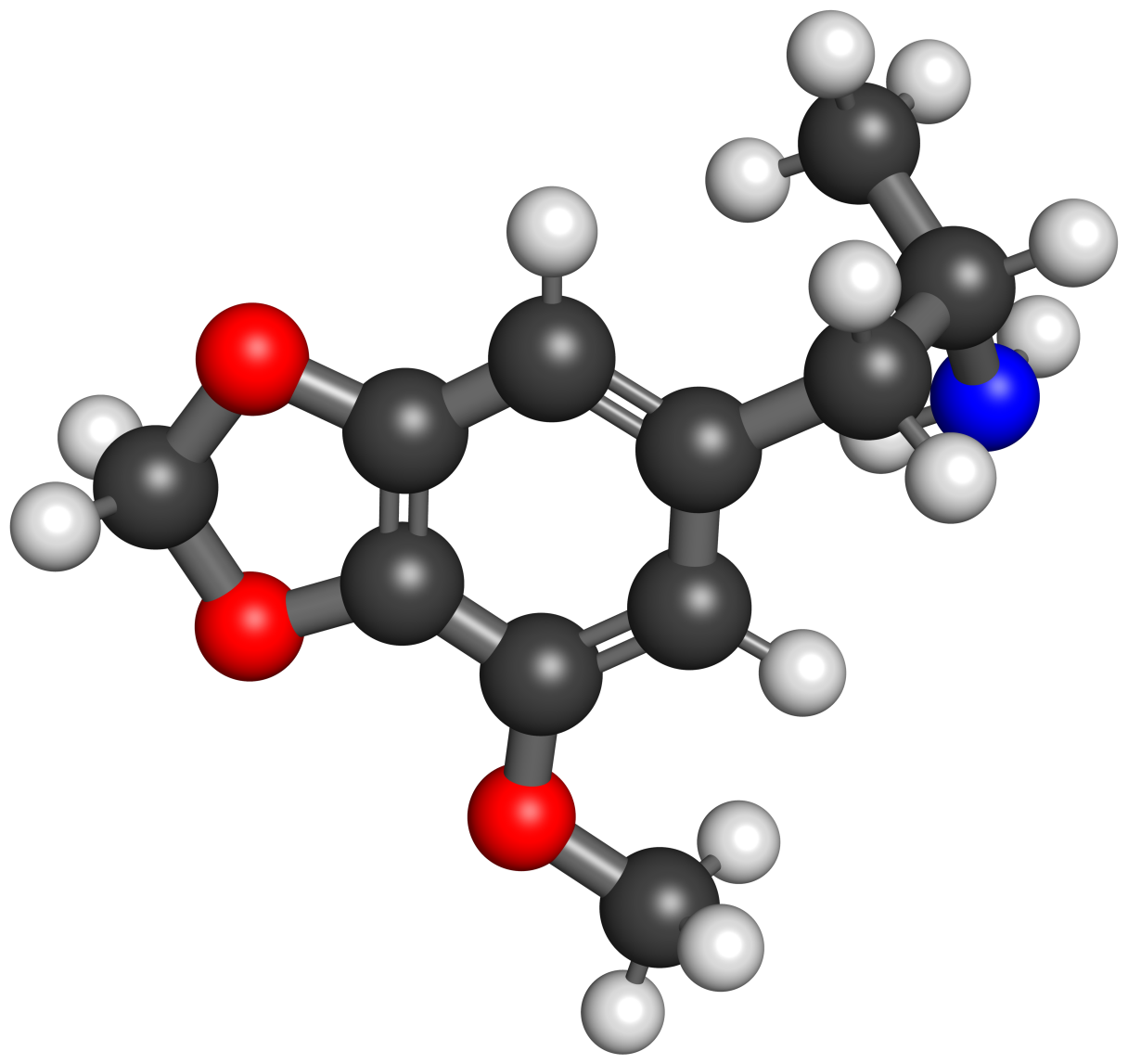

Clinical data
- Other names: 3-Methoxy-4,5-methylenedioxyamphetamine; 5-Methoxy-MDA; 5-MeO-MDA
- Routes of administration: Oral
- Drug class: Serotonin 5-HT_{2A} receptor agonist; Serotonin releasing agent; Serotonergic psychedelic; Hallucinogen; Entactogen
- ATC code: None

Legal status
- Legal status: AU: S9 (Prohibited substance); BR: Class F2 (Prohibited psychotropics); CA: Schedule I; DE: Anlage I (Authorized scientific use only); UK: Class A; US: Schedule I; UN: Psychotropic Schedule I

Pharmacokinetic data
- Onset of action: 20–45 minutes
- Duration of action: "Moderate"

Identifiers
- IUPAC name: 1-(7-methoxy-1,3-benzodioxol-5-yl)propan-2-amine
- CAS Number: 13674-05-0
- PubChem CID: 26175
- DrugBank: DB01442
- ChemSpider: 24386
- UNII: RG7FY73ZAA
- KEGG: C22812
- CompTox Dashboard (EPA): DTXSID50860757

Chemical and physical data
- Formula: C_{11}H_{15}NO_{3}
- Molar mass: 209.245 g·mol^{−1}
- 3D model (JSmol): Interactive image
- SMILES: CC(CC1=CC2=C(C(=C1)OC)OCO2)N
- InChI: InChI=1S/C11H15NO3/c1-7(12)3-8-4-9(13-2)11-10(5-8)14-6-15-11/h4-5,7H,3,6,12H2,1-2H3; Key:YQYUWUKDEVZFDB-UHFFFAOYSA-N

MMDA, also known as 3-methoxy-4,5-methylenedioxyamphetamine or as 5-methoxy-MDA, is a psychedelic and entactogen of the amphetamine family.

== Use and effects ==
In his book PiHKAL (Phenethylamines I Have Known and Loved), Alexander Shulgin lists MMDA's dose as 100 to 250 mg orally and its duration as "moderate". Its onset is described as 20 to 45 minutes. The effects of MMDA have been reported to include relaxation, time dilation, empathy, passivity, compassion, changes in music perception, closed-eye visuals such as geometric patterns, open-eye visuals, dream-like states described as "brain movies", and an afterglow. It has been said to be gentler than certain other psychedelics. The drug is said to have similar effects to MDA, but to be to some extent more psychedelic in comparison.

== Side effects ==
Side effects of MMDA have been reported to include restlessness, cold sensations, shivering, nausea, abdominal cramps, disorientation, social withdrawal, feeling ill, and anxiety.

== Pharmacology ==
=== Pharmacodynamics ===
MMDA has been shown to act as a non-neurotoxic serotonin releasing agent, with no effects on release of dopamine or probably norepinephrine, and as a serotonin 5-HT_{2A} receptor agonist. The latter property is thought to be responsible for its psychedelic effects, whereas the former action may be involved in its entactogenic effects.

=== Pharmacokinetics ===
MMDA has been found to be formed from myristicin, a component of nutmeg, in rabbits and rats. However, MMDA could not be detected with nutmeg misuse in a human.

== Chemistry ==
=== Synthesis ===
The chemical synthesis of MMDA has been described.

=== Analogues ===
Analogues of MMDA include lophophine (MMDPEA), MDA, MDMA, and TMA. Positional isomers of MMDA include MMDA-2, MMDA-3a, MMDA-3b, MMDA-4, and MMDA-5. Further analogues and derivatives of MMDA include DMMDA, DMMDA-2, DMMDA-3, DMMDA-4, DMMDA-5, and DMMDA-6. Other analogues of MMDA include 4T-MMDA-2 and 2T-MMDA-3a.

== History ==
MMDA was first synthesized and studied by Gordon Alles at the Edgewood Arsenal in the mid-1950s. Its Edgewood Arsenal code name is unknown. Subsequently, Alexander Shulgin synthesized MMDA in 1962 and discovered its psychoactive effects that same year. Shulgin published his findings on MMDA in the scientific literature in 1964. Use of MMDA in psychedelic-assisted psychotherapy was studied by Shulgin, Thornton Sargent, and Claudio Naranjo in the mid-1960s and their findings were published in 1973. Naranjo also described MMDA for these purposes in his 1973 book The Healing Journey: New Approaches to Consciousness. Shulgin subsequently further described MMDA in his book PiHKAL (Phenethylamines I Have Known and Loved) in 1991.

== Society and culture ==
=== Legal status ===
==== International ====
Internationally, MMDA is a Schedule I drug under the Convention on Psychotropic Substances.

==== Australia ====
MMDA is considered a Schedule 9 prohibited substance in Australia under the Poisons Standard (October 2015). A Schedule 9 substance is a substance which may be abused or misused, the manufacture, possession, sale or use of which should be prohibited by law except when required for medical or scientific research, or for analytical, teaching or training purposes with approval of Commonwealth and/or State or Territory Health Authorities.

==== Canada ====
MMDA is a Schedule I controlled substance in Canada.

==== United States ====
MMDA is classified as a Schedule 1 controlled substance in the United States.

== See also ==
- Substituted methylenedioxyphenethylamine
- Substituted methoxyphenethylamine
- Methoxymethylenedioxyamphetamine
- Dimethoxymethylenedioxyamphetamine
