= 4T-MMDA-2 =

Clinical data
- Other names: 4-T-MMDA-2; 3,4-Methyleneoxythio-6-methoxyamphetamine; 2-Methoxy-4,5-methylenethiooxyamphetamine; 6-(2-Aminopropyl)-5-methoxy-1,3-benzoxathiol; 4,5-Thiomethyleneoxy-2-methoxyamphetamine; 4-Thio-MMDA-2
- Routes of administration: Oral
- Drug class: Psychoactive drug
- ATC code: None

Pharmacokinetic data
- Duration of action: Unknown

Identifiers
- IUPAC name: 1-(5-methoxy-1,3-benzoxathiol-6-yl)propan-2-amine
- CAS Number: 133787-69-6
- PubChem CID: 44719663
- ChemSpider: 23553180
- UNII: NF243AEE6J

Chemical and physical data
- Formula: C_{11}H_{15}NO_{2}S
- Molar mass: 225.31 g·mol^{−1}
- 3D model (JSmol): Interactive image
- SMILES: CC(CC1=CC2=C(C=C1OC)SCO2)N
- InChI: InChI=1S/C11H15NO2S/c1-7(12)3-8-4-10-11(15-6-14-10)5-9(8)13-2/h4-5,7H,3,6,12H2,1-2H3; Key:NCUQXFZYILOELC-UHFFFAOYSA-N

4T-MMDA-2, also known as 3,4-methyleneoxythio-6-methoxyamphetamine or as 2-methoxy-4,5-methylenethiooxyamphetamine, is a psychoactive drug of the phenethylamine and amphetamine families related to 3,4-methylenedioxyamphetamine (MDA). It is the analogue of MMDA-2 (6-methoxy-MDA) in which one of the oxygen atoms of the methylenedioxy ring, specifically the 4-position oxygen, has been replaced with a sulfur atom.

According to Alexander Shulgin in his 1991 book PiHKAL (Phenethylamines I Have Known and Loved), a 4T-MMDA-2 dose of 25 mg orally might be a threshold dose and the active dose is listed as greater than 25 mg. The effects at this "inactive" dose included possible mild exhiliration and a hint of tremor and teeth clenching 3 hours after administration. Higher doses were not explored and the duration is unknown. For comparison, MMDA-2 has a dose of 25 to 50 mg and a duration of 8 to 12 hours.

The effects of 4T-MMDA-2 and various analogues on serotonin and dopamine release in rat brain synaptosomes in vitro were studied by Dennis McKenna and Shulgin and colleagues. 4T-MMDA-2 and MMDA-2 showed essentially abolished monoamine release, in contrast to other related drugs like MDA, MDMA, and MMDA (5-methoxy-MDA), suggesting that 4T-MMDA-2 would not have entactogenic or stimulant effects.

The chemical synthesis of 4T-MMDA-2 has been described.

4T-MMDA-2 was first described in the scientific literature by Alexander Shulgin and colleagues in PiHKAL and in a journal article by 1991. It was first tested by Shulgin in 1977.

== See also ==
- Substituted methylenedioxyphenethylamine § Related compounds
- 2T-MMDA-3a
- SDA (3T-MDA) and SDMA (3T-MDMA)
