= Ψ-PEA =

Class of chemical compounds

TMA-6 (Ψ-TMA-2) is an example of a Ψ-PEA psychedelic.

Ψ-Phenethylamines (Ψ-PEA), or psi-phenethylamines (psi-PEA), also known as pseudo-phenethylamines or as 4-substituted 2,6-dimethoxyphenethylamines, are a family of psychedelic and related compounds of the phenethylamine family. They are positional isomers of the 4-substituted 2,5-dimethoxyphenethylamines (e.g., 2Cs and DOx) and 4-substituted 3,5-dimethoxyphenethylamines (e.g., scalines and 3Cs).

Like the preceding groups or substitution patterns of phenethylamine psychedelics, many Ψ-PEA derivatives are potent serotonergic psychedelics and are known to act as serotonin 5-HT_{2A} receptor agonists. Examples of known psychedelic Ψ-PEAs include TMA-6 (Ψ-TMA-2), Ψ-DOM, Ψ-2C-T-4, Ψ-2C-DFMO, Ψ-DODFMO, and 2,4,6-TMPEA-NBOMe (26O-NBOMe; ψ-2C-O-NBOMe). Conversely, Ψ-2C-O (TMPEA-6) was inactive. Unlike many other psychedelic phenethylamines, Ψ-PEAs such as TMA-6, Ψ-Aleph, and Ψ-Aleph-2 are known to act as potent monoamine oxidase inhibitors (MAOIs).

The Ψ-PEAs are relatively unexplored compared to the other major psychedelic phenethylamine groups. Many Ψ-PEAs have been synthesized or described, but few are known to have been tested in humans.

The receptor interactions of Ψ-PEAs and their amphetamine counterparts have been studied and described. They are partial agonists of the serotonin 5-HT_{2A} receptor and also interact with other serotonin receptors and targets.

== Use and effects ==
Doses and durations of Ψ-PEAs
Compound	Chemical name	Dose	Duration
TMPEA-6 (Ψ-2C-O)	2,4,6-Trimethoxyphenethylamine	>300 mg	Unknown
TMA-6 (Ψ-TMA-2)	2,4,6-Trimethoxyamphetamine	25–50 mg	12–16 hours
Ψ-DOM	4-Methyl-2,6-dimethoxyamphetamine	15–25 mg	6–8 hours
Ψ-2C-T-4	4-Isopropylthio-2,6-dimethoxyphenethylamine	≥12 mg	Unknown
Ψ-2C-DFMO (Ψ-2C-O-35)	4-Difluoromethoxy-2,6-dimethoxyphenethylamine	~17 mg	~18 hours
Ψ-DODFMO	4-Difluoromethoxy-2,6-dimethoxyamphetamine	~10 mg	~20 hours
2,4,6-TMPEA-NBOMe	N-(2-Methoxybenzyl)-2,4,6-trimethoxyphenethylamine	Unknown	Unknown
Refs:

Other ψ-PEAs have also been described. Another notable ψ-PEA is ψ-2C-D-FLY.

== Chemistry ==
Chemical structures of selected ψ-PEAs
TMPEA-6 (Ψ-2C-O)

TMA-6 (Ψ-TMA-2)

ψ-DOM (psi-DOM)

Ψ-2C-T-4 (psi-2C-T-4)

Ψ-2C-DFMO (ψ-2C-O-35)

Ψ-DODFMO (psi-2C-T-4)

Ψ-2C-D-FLY (psi-2C-D-FLY)

2,4,6-TMPEA-NBOMe (ψ-2C-O-NBOMe; 26O-NBOMe)

== Society and culture ==
=== Legal status ===
==== Canada ====
The Ψ-PEA drugs are controlled substances in Canada under phenethylamine blanket-ban language.

== See also ==
- Substituted methoxyphenethylamine
- 2C, scaline, DOx, 3C
- CT-5172
- Buflomedil
