= 2,4,6-Trimethoxyamphetamine =

TMA-6

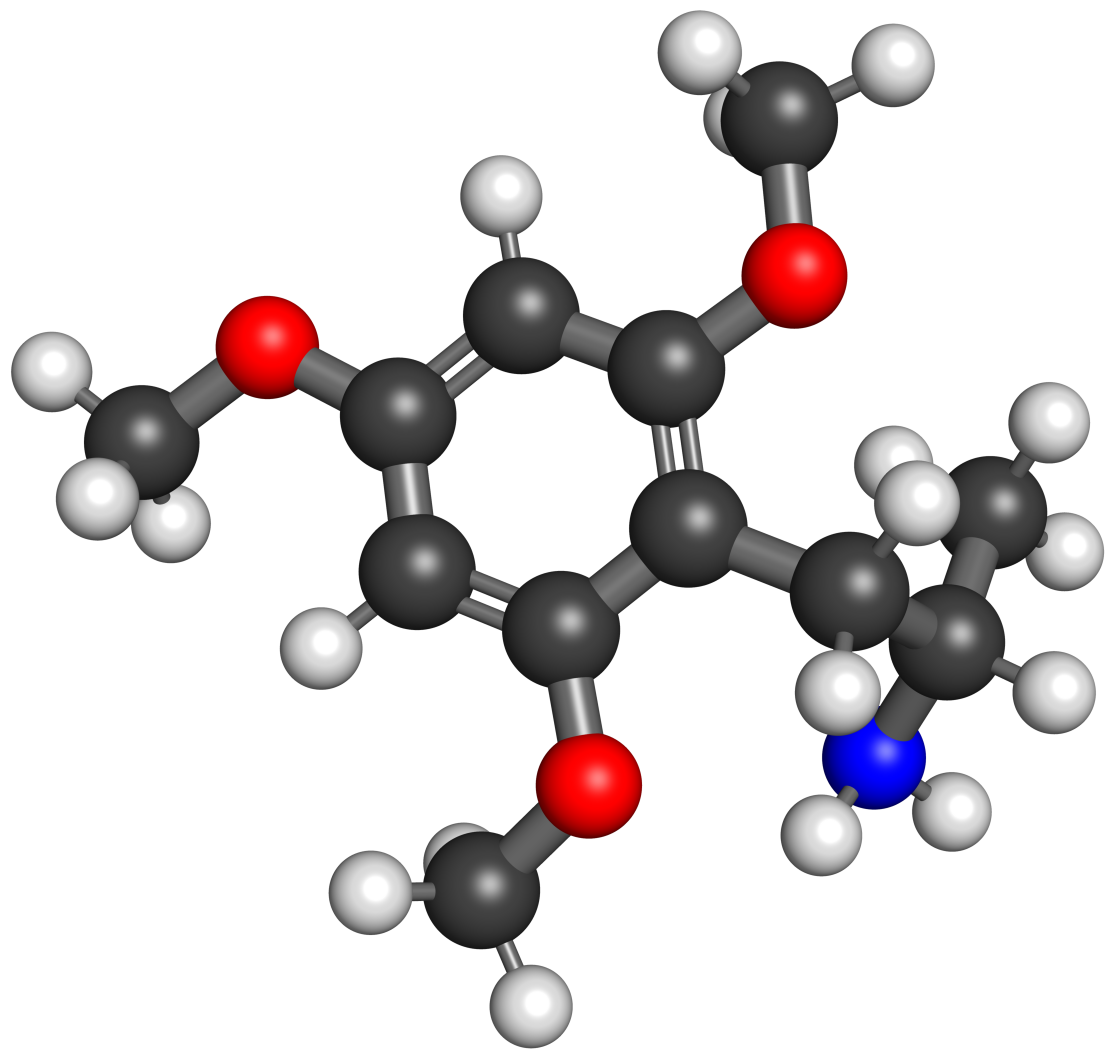

Clinical data
- Other names: 2,4,6-TMA; TMA-6; ψ-TMA-2; NSC-367445
- Routes of administration: Oral
- Drug class: Serotonin receptor modulator; Serotonin 5-HT_{2A} receptor agonist; Serotonergic psychedelic; Hallucinogen
- ATC code: None

Pharmacokinetic data
- Duration of action: 12–16 hours

Identifiers
- IUPAC name: 1-(2,4,6-trimethoxyphenyl)propan-2-amine
- CAS Number: 15402-79-6
- PubChem CID: 31015
- ChemSpider: 28774
- UNII: 2X84DCO6GA
- ChEMBL: ChEMBL34108
- CompTox Dashboard (EPA): DTXSID40874363

Chemical and physical data
- Formula: C_{12}H_{19}NO_{3}
- Molar mass: 225.288 g·mol^{−1}
- 3D model (JSmol): Interactive image
- SMILES: CC(CC1=C(C=C(C=C1OC)OC)OC)N
- InChI: InChI=1S/C12H19NO3/c1-8(13)5-10-11(15-3)6-9(14-2)7-12(10)16-4/h6-8H,5,13H2,1-4H3; Key:DDGNOUVDFKXADP-UHFFFAOYSA-N

2,4,6-Trimethoxyamphetamine (2,4,6-TMA), also known as TMA-6 or ψ-TMA-2, is a psychedelic drug of the phenethylamine, amphetamine, and Ψ-PEA families. It is one of the positional isomers of trimethoxyamphetamine (TMA).

== Use and effects ==
In his book PiHKAL (Phenethylamines I Have Known and Loved), Alexander Shulgin lists TMA-6's dose as 25 to 50 mg orally and its duration as 12 to 16 hours. Threshold effects occur at 20 mg, a full hallucinogenic state occurs at 30 to 40 mg, and erratic results have been reported for 40 to 80 mg. The drug is said to have about 8 to 10 times the potency of mescaline.

The effects of TMA-6 have been reported to include ease with concepts and writing, body tingling, walking unsteadiness, thinking difficulty or intoxication, difficulty with tasks, funniness, hilarity, and laughter, difficulty sleeping, inner chill, visual sparkle, stomach queasiness, diarrhea, reduced appetite, fluctuating emotions, personal insights, visuals, colors, and feelings of "energy flow". Additional reported effects include enjoyable lightheadedness, euphoria, perceptual distortion, synesthesia, and nausea.

== Pharmacology ==
=== Pharmacodynamics ===
TMA-6 shows affinity for serotonin receptors in rat stomach fundus strips (A_{2} = 525 nM) as well as in rat brain membranes (IC_{50} = 25,000 nM). In a later study, it showed no affinity for the serotonin 5-HT_{1A} or dopamine D_{2} receptors (K_{i} = >10,000 nM). Subsequently, it was reported to be a potent serotonin 5-HT_{2A} receptor full agonist, with an EC_{50} of 29.2 nM and an E_{max} of 107%. The drug was inactive as a monoamine reuptake inhibitor and releasing agent in rat brain synaptosomes (IC_{50} and EC_{50} = >100,000 nM, respectively). The drug is a potent monoamine oxidase A (MAO-A) inhibitor, with an IC_{50} of 400 nM. This is in contrast to TMA (3,4,5-TMA) and TMA-2 (2,4,5-TMA), which are inactive in this regard.

TMA-6 fully substitutes for the psychedelic drugs DOM and 5-MeO-DMT in rodent drug discrimination tests. It also partially substitutes for dextroamphetamine in rodent drug discrimination tests.

== Chemistry ==
=== Synthesis ===
The chemical synthesis of TMA-6 has been described.

=== Analogues ===
A number of analogues of TMA-6 with a 2,4,6- substitution pattern have been described, such as Ψ-DOM and ψ-2C-T-4, among others. Alexander Shulgin only limitedly explored the 2,4,6- substitution pattern.

== History ==
TMA-6 was first described in the scientific literature by 1954. Alexander Shulgin discovered its psychedelic effects in 1964 and first described its hallucinogenic effects in the literature in 1969, where he stated its potency relative to mescaline and noted that these findings were previously unpublished. Shulgin subsequently gave the drug the name TMA-6 in 1970. He more thoroughly described TMA-6 in PiHKAL in 1991. The drug was encountered as a novel designer drug in Europe in 2009.

== Society and culture ==
=== Legal status ===
==== Canada ====
TMA-6 is a controlled substance in Canada under phenethylamine blanket-ban language.

==== United States ====
As a positional isomer of TMA, TMA-6 is a Schedule I controlled substance in the United States.

== See also ==
- Trimethoxyamphetamine
- Ψ-PEA (psychedelics)
- Substituted methoxyphenethylamine
- 2,4,6-Trimethoxyphenethylamine (2,4,6-TMPEA; ψ-2C-O)
- Ψ-DOM (2,6-dimethoxy-4-methylamphetamine)
- 2,4-Dimethoxyamphetamine (2,4-DMA)
