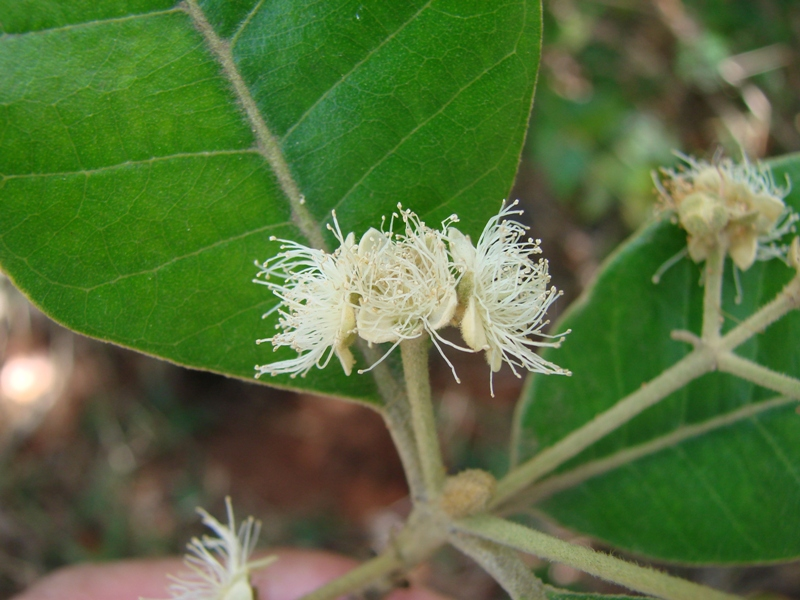

Scientific classification
- Kingdom: Plantae
- Clade: Embryophytes
- Clade: Tracheophytes
- Clade: Angiosperms
- Clade: Eudicots
- Clade: Rosids
- Order: Myrtales
- Family: Myrtaceae
- Genus: Pimenta
- Species: P. pseudocaryophyllus

Binomial name
- Pimenta pseudocaryophyllus (Gomes) Landrum

= Pimenta pseudocaryophyllus =

Species of flowering plant

Pimenta pseudocaryophyllus, popularly known as cataia, craveiro or louro-cravo, is a species from the family Myrtaceae.

It is largely distributed in pantropical and subtropical regions, including Central America and South America.

== Chemical composition ==
It contains chavibetol and methyleugenol.

== Uses ==
=== Traditional medicine ===
It is a medicinal plant in traditional folk medicine. The leaves are used to prepare a refreshing drink known for its putative diuretic, sedative, and aphrodisiac actions.

The population of Guaraqueçaba, in the state of Paraná, Brazil, uses an infusion of P. pseudocaryophyllus leaves in the form of tea to treat the predisposition to arthritic and gouty affections of the joints, fever and other diseases. Studies about P. pseudocaryophyllus describe its extracts as having anxiolytic and sedative action and antioxidant activity.
