= Ψ-DODFMO =

Clinical data
- Other names: 4-Difluoromethoxy-2,6-dimethoxyamphetamine
- Routes of administration: Oral
- Drug class: Serotonergic psychedelic; Hallucinogen
- ATC code: None

Pharmacokinetic data
- Duration of action: ~20 hours

Identifiers
- IUPAC name: 1-[4-(difluoromethoxy)-2,6-dimethoxyphenyl]propan-2-amine

Chemical and physical data
- Formula: C_{12}H_{17}F_{2}NO_{3}
- Molar mass: 261.269 g·mol^{−1}
- 3D model (JSmol): Interactive image
- SMILES: COc1cc(OC(F)F)cc(c1CC(N)C)OC
- InChI: InChI=1S/C12H17F2NO3/c1-7(15)4-9-10(16-2)5-8(18-12(13)14)6-11(9)17-3/h5-7,12H,4,15H2,1-3H3; Key:XEJQGOZXVLCLQY-UHFFFAOYSA-N

Ψ-DODFMO, also known as 4-difluoromethoxy-2,6-dimethoxyamphetamine, is a psychedelic drug of the phenethylamine, amphetamine, and ψ-phenethylamine families. It is the amphetamine (α-methyl) analogue of ψ-2C-DFMO and is also structurally related to other psychedelics like difluoromescaline (DFM) and 2C-T-35 (2C-T-DFM). The drug has been found to be active at a dose of 5 mg plus 5 mg (or 10 mg total) orally, with moderately intense effects and a relatively long duration of around 20 hours. Ψ-DODFMO was first described in the scientific literature by Daniel Trachsel in 2012. It is a controlled substance in Canada under phenethylamine blanket-ban language.

== See also ==
- ψ-Phenethylamine
- Ψ-2C-DFMO
- Difluoromescaline (DFM)
- 2C-T-35 (2C-T-DFM)
