= 2T-MMDA-3a =

Clinical data
- Other names: 2-MeS-MDA; 2-Methylthio-3,4-methylenedioxyamphetamine; 3,4-Methylenedioxy-2-methylthioamphetamine
- Routes of administration: Oral
- Drug class: Serotonergic psychedelic; Hallucinogen
- ATC code: None

Pharmacokinetic data
- Onset of action: Unknown
- Duration of action: Unknown

Identifiers
- IUPAC name: 1-(4-methylsulfanyl-1,3-benzodioxol-5-yl)propan-2-amine
- CAS Number: 952017-31-1
- PubChem CID: 44719661
- ChemSpider: 23553177
- UNII: 5GP2MP7YKC

Chemical and physical data
- Formula: C_{11}H_{15}NO_{2}S
- Molar mass: 225.31 g·mol^{−1}
- 3D model (JSmol): Interactive image
- SMILES: CC(CC1=C(C2=C(C=C1)OCO2)SC)N
- InChI: InChI=1S/C11H15NO2S/c1-7(12)5-8-3-4-9-10(11(8)15-2)14-6-13-9/h3-4,7H,5-6,12H2,1-2H3; Key:NMNCXGKWTVPITN-UHFFFAOYSA-N

2T-MMDA-3a, also known as 2-methylthio-3,4-methylenedioxyamphetamine (2-MeS-MDA), is a psychedelic drug of the phenethylamine, amphetamine, and MDxx families related to 3,4-methylenedioxyamphetamine (MDA). It is the derivative of MDA with a 2-methylthio substitution and is the analogue of MMDA-3a with a 2-methylthio group instead of a 2-methoxy group.

2T-MMDA-3a was included as an entry in Alexander Shulgin's book PiHKAL (Phenethylamines I Have Known and Loved). Its dose was listed as greater than 12 mg orally, its duration was listed as unknown, and its effects were not described. However, in Shulgin's 2011 book The Shulgin Index, Volume One: Psychedelic Phenethylamines and Related Compounds, he stated that a 12 mg dose produced threshold effects, but he did not assess higher doses. In addition, Daniel Trachsel has classified 2T-MMDA-3a as a hallucinogen.

The chemical synthesis of 2T-MMDA-3a was described by Shulgin in PiHKAL. Numerous other sulfur-containing phenethylamine analogues are also possible.

2T-MMDA-3a was first described in the scientific literature by Shulgin in PiHKAL in 1991. It is a controlled substance in Canada under phenethylamine blanket-ban language.

== See also ==
- Substituted methylenedioxyphenethylamine
- 4T-MMDA-2
