= Chavibetol =

Names
- Preferred IUPAC name 2-Methoxy-5-(prop-2-en-1-yl)phenol
- Other names 5-Allylguaiacol; m-Eugenol; meta-Eugenol; 5-Allyl-2-methoxyphenol

Identifiers
CAS Number	501-19-9
3D model (JSmol)	Interactive image
ChEMBL	ChEMBL259093
ChemSpider	518422
PubChem CID	596375
UNII	OE7NQ16G4D
CompTox Dashboard (EPA)	DTXSID70198206
- InChI: InChI=1S/C10H12O2/c1-3-4-8-5-6-10(12-2)9(11)7-8/h3,5-7,11H,1,4H2,2H3 Key: NPBVQXIMTZKSBA-UHFFFAOYSA-N; InChI=1/C10H12O2/c1-3-4-8-5-6-10(12-2)9(11)7-8/h3,5-7,11H,1,4H2,2H3 Key: NPBVQXIMTZKSBA-UHFFFAOYAR
- SMILES: Oc1cc(ccc1OC)C\C=C

Properties
Chemical formula	C_{10}H_{12}O_{2}
Molar mass	164.204 g·mol^{−1}
Density	1.06 g/cm^{3}
Boiling point	254 °C (489 °F; 527 K)
- Except where otherwise noted, data are given for materials in their standard state (at 25 °C [77 °F], 100 kPa). verify (what is ?) Infobox references

Chavibetol is an organic chemical compound of the phenylpropanoid class. It is one of the primary constituents of the essential oil from the leaves of the betel plant (Piper betel) and catatia. It is an aromatic compound with a spicy odor.

== Uses ==
- Decor, candle – Chemicals detected in substances or products (note that these chemicals may be absent from an 'ingredient list' for the product and thus unexpected, but have been detected in product testing studies)
- Fragrance – Fragrances or odor agents, can be used in home products (cleaners, laundry products, air fresheners) or similar industrial products; usage indicated when known; more specific modifiers included when known.

== See also ==
- PiHKAL § Essential amphetamines
