= 6-APDB =

Stimulant designer drug

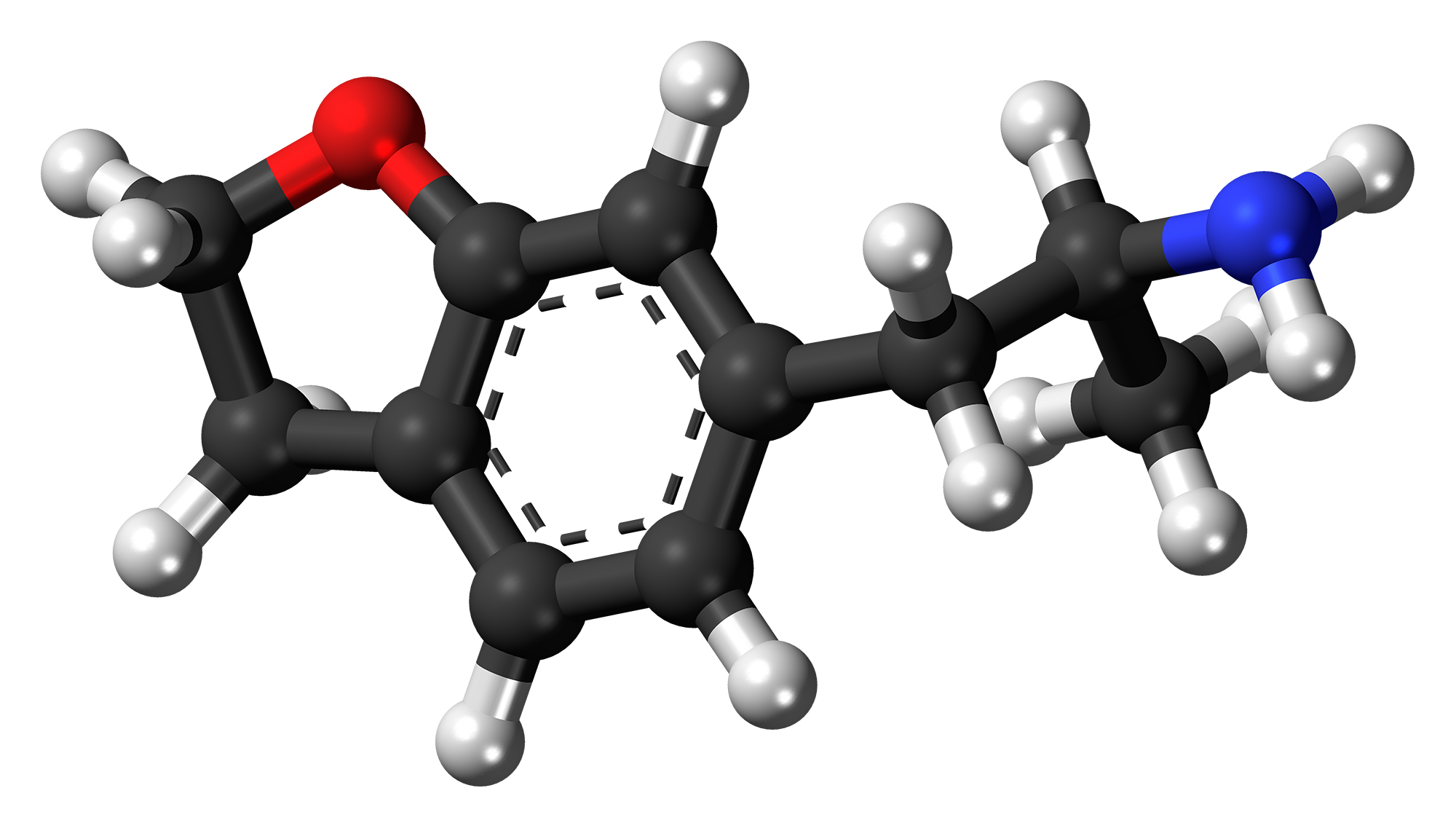

Clinical data
- Other names: 6-(2-Aminopropyl)-2,3-dihydrobenzofuran; 4-Desoxy-MDA; EMA-3; BF6AP
- Routes of administration: Oral
- Drug class: Entactogen; Stimulant
- ATC code: None

Legal status
- Legal status: CA: Schedule I; DE: NpSG (Industrial and scientific use only); UK: Class B

Identifiers
- IUPAC name: 1-(2,3-dihydro-1-benzofuran-6-yl)propan-2-amine
- CAS Number: 152623-93-3
- PubChem CID: 192599
- ChemSpider: 167141
- UNII: O72F3CP4O8
- ChEMBL: ChEMBL124055
- CompTox Dashboard (EPA): DTXSID60934559

Chemical and physical data
- Formula: C_{11}H_{15}NO
- Molar mass: 177.247 g·mol^{−1}
- 3D model (JSmol): Interactive image
- SMILES: O2c1cc(ccc1CC2)CC(N)C
- InChI: InChI=1S/C11H15NO/c1-8(12)6-9-2-3-10-4-5-13-11(10)7-9/h2-3,7-8H,4-6,12H2,1H3; Key:VRNGXHJGMCJRSQ-UHFFFAOYSA-N

6-APDB, also known as 6-(2-aminopropyl)-2,3-dihydrobenzofuran or as 4-desoxy-MDA, is an entactogen of the phenethylamine, amphetamine, and dihydrobenzofuran families. It is an analogue of MDA where the heterocyclic 4-position oxygen from the 3,4-methylenedioxy ring has been replaced with a methylene bridge. 5-APDB (3-desoxy-MDA) is an analogue of 6-APDB where the 3-position oxygen has been replaced with a methylene instead. 5-APDB was developed by a team led by David E. Nichols at Purdue University as part of their research into non-neurotoxic analogues of MDMA and first described in 1993.

== Pharmacology ==
=== Pharmacodynamics ===
In animal drug discrimination studies, 6-APDB fully substitutes for MBDB and MMAI but not for amphetamine or LSD. In vitro, 6-APDB has been shown to inhibit the reuptake of serotonin, dopamine, and norepinephrine with IC_{50} values of 322 nM, 1,997 nM, and 980 nM, respectively. These values are very similar to those of MDA, but with those for the catecholamines slightly lower in comparison, perhaps more similarly to MDMA. Though 6-APDB does not substitute for amphetamine in rats at the doses used in referenced study, based on its in vitro profile it can be suggested that it may have amphetamine-like effects at higher doses. It also has activities at serotonin receptors.

In subsequent animal studies, 6-APDB produced robust hyperlocomotion and, in drug discrimination tests, fully substituted for MDMA, partially substituted for DOM and cocaine, and failed to substitute for methamphetamine.

== Chemistry ==
6-APDB, also known as 6-(2-aminopropyl)-2,3-dihydrobenzofuran, is a phenethylamine, amphetamine, and dihydrobenzofuran and an analogue of 3,4-methylenedioxyamphetamine (MDA).

=== Synthesis ===
The chemical synthesis of 6-APDB has been described.

=== Analogues ===
In contrast to 6-APDB, 5-APDB is highly selective for serotonin.

The unsaturated benzofuran derivative 6-APB, or 6-(2-aminopropyl)benzofuran is also known, but the difference in pharmacological effects between 6-APB and 6-APDB is unclear.

== History ==
6-APDB, along with 5-APDB, was described by David E. Nichols and colleagues at Purdue University as an MDMA analogue in 1993. Subsequently, the non-dihydrogenated benzofurans 5-APB and 6-APB emerged as novel designer drugs in 2010. Prior to this, 5-APB and 6-APB had been patented and first described by Eli Lilly and Company as serotonin 5-HT_{2C} receptor agonists for potential medical applications in 2000. 5-APB and 6-APB are often confused with 5-APDB and 6-APDB.

== Society and culture ==
=== Legal status ===
==== Canada ====
6-APDB is a Schedule I controlled substance in Canada due phenethylamine blanket-ban language.

==== United Kingdom ====
6-APDB is a class B drug in the United Kingdom since June 10, 2013. It is banned by a blanket law on benzofurans and related compounds.

==== United States ====
6-APDB is not an explicitly controlled substance in the United States. However, it could be considered a controlled substance related to MDMA under the Federal Analogue Act if intended for human consumption.

== See also ==
- Substituted benzofuran
