= C13H21NO2S =

The molecular formula C_{13}H_{21}NO_{2}S (molar mass: 255.38 g/mol) may refer to:

- 2C-T-4
- 2C-T-7
- 2CT2-2-EtO
- 2CT2-5-EtO
- Aleph-2
- Thioasymbescalines
  - 3-Thioasymbescaline
  - 4-Thioasymbescaline
  - 5-Thioasymbescaline
- Thioproscaline
- Thiosymbescalines
  - 3-Thiosymbescaline (3-TSB)
  - 4-Thiosymbescaline (4-TSB)
- Tiprenolol
- Ψ-2C-T-4
