= List of news aircraft accidents and incidents =

This is a list of news aircraft accidents and incidents.

== Accidents occurring while gathering news ==
Accident date	Location	Television station	Description	Fatalities	Injuries	Summary
2026-09-15	Chatsworth, Los Angeles, California, United States	KNBC/KVEA (Note: KNBC (NBC Los Angeles) and KVEA (Telemundo 52) are owned and operated by NBC Universal Media Group and jointly use a helicopter.)	The helicopter "NewsChopper4" reporting on an earlier bus crash in Chatsworth crashed in the 9100 block of North Mason Avenue.	3	2	Under investigation
2023-12-19	Washington Township, Burlington County, New Jersey, United States	WPVI-TV	The helicopter "Chopper 6" was on its way back from covering a story on the Jersey Shore, when it crashed in South Jersey.	2	0	Under investigation
2018-01-23	Recife, Pernambuco, Brazil	Rede Globo	A Robinson R44 crashed into the sea in Pina beach, in heavy rain. Three people were on the helicopter. The pilot and one passenger died on the spot, and another occupant died in the hospital.	3	0	
2017-09-16	Carrizozo, New Mexico, United States	KRQE-TV	Helicopter crashed near Carrizozo, New Mexico. Bob Martin, veteran journalist and pilot was killed	1	0	
2014-05-21	Beverly, Massachusetts, United States	WHDH-TV	A Bell 206L-4 was departing Beverly Airport in Beverly MA when an engine failure occurred.	0	0	After auto-rotating back to the airport, the helicopter broke the tail off during the flare maneuver.
2014-03-18	Seattle, Washington, United States	KOMO-TV	A Eurocopter AS350 B2 serving as a backup helicopter while the station's primary Bell 407 was getting new equipment crashed near Seattle Center when departing the KOMO-TV Helipad after refueling.	2	1	As seen from a Skycam, the helicopter's tail rotor failed when taking off from the KOMO-TV building's helipad. It then impacted the ground resulting in a fire.
2012-08-27	Los Angeles, California, United States	KTLA-TV	While covering a shooting, an AS350 B2 began emitting smoke from the engine which was spotted by another news helicopter covering the same story.	0	0	An oil line got clogged and started putting oil into hot parts of the engine resulting in the large amount of smoke.
2011-08-18	Lake Eyre, Australia	Australian Broadcasting Corporation	A Eurocopter AS355 helicopter crashed and killed the pilot, reporter and cameraman whilst on location.	3	0	"... the pilot probably became spatially disoriented."
2010-11-12	Pacoima, California, United States	KCBS-TV/KCAL-TV	An AS350-B2 experienced an engine failure when taking off to cover a news story. The tail came off after an auto-rotation.	0	0	As part of the emergency landing procedure, the pilot flared the chopper (nose up) to slow it down and hit the tail boom against the runway, resulting in the tail boom coming off
2010-06-24	Clinton Township, Michigan, United States	WXYZ-TV/WDIV-TV/WJBK-TV	While following a procession for a fallen soldier, the chopper's crew heard two loud bangs from the engine compartment followed by a master alarm buzzer.	0	0	The chopper auto-rotated to the ground without any problems and was repaired.
2010-06-18	Buenos Aires, Argentina	C5N	An MBB Bo 105 helicopter crashed and killed the pilot and camera operator while filming a car accident.	2	0	
2010-02-10	São Paulo, São Paulo, Brazil	RecordTV	One Eurocopter AS350-BA baptized "Águia Dourada" was covering the traffic in the city, when it fell in the track of the Jockey Club. The pilot died and the cameraman was injured.	1	1	A fail on the tail rotor would have been the cause of the accident.
2009-12-16	Montreal, Quebec, Canada	CFTM-TV	A Robinson R44 traffic helicopter, while filming over Champlain Bridge, crashed in a ditch near Autoroute 10 while trying to make an emergency landing on a nearby heliport.	0	2	
2009-08-05	Mont-Laurier, Quebec, Canada	CFCF-TV	An Enstrom 28 helicopter crashed and burst into flames while filming the aftermath of a tornado	2	0	
2008-11-11	West Palm Beach, Florida, United States	WPEC	A Bell 206B made an emergency landing after losing power. The tail boom of the helicopter was severed in the accident. Both the pilot and traffic reporter on board escaped serious injury.	0	2	"A loss of engine power due to an undertorqued air line fitting to the fuel control."
2008-10-13	Montgomery County, TX, United States	KTRK-TV	While traveling to the scene of a shooting, SkyEye-HD, a Bell 206L-4 crashed into the heavily wooded W.G. Jones State Forest in southern Montgomery County.	2	0	Preliminary reports indicate the aircraft lost engine power while traveling over a heavily wooded area. The aircraft then lost altitude and impacted the trees and ground, which resulted in a fire.
2008-06-30	Oakland, California, United States	Metro Traffic Networks	While engaged in traffic reporting, a Cessna 172M airplane developed engine trouble and made an emergency landing.	0	2	Loss of engine power due to oil starvation from the improper installation of engine oil pump.
2007-07-30	Grand Prairie, TX, United States	KDFW-TV	"Sky 4" experienced a mechanical failure as it traveled from an 18-wheeler accident to a breaking news event. This failure forced the pilot to make an emergency landing in a heavily wooded area, which resulted in major damage to the aircraft.	0	1	The loss of engine power as result of the failure of one or more of the compressor blades for the 5th stage compressor for undetermined reasons. A contributing factor was the lack of suitable terrain for the pilot to execute a successful autorotation.
2007-07-27	Phoenix, Arizona, United States	KNXV-TV and KTVK	Two Eurocopter AS350-B2 news helicopters from local television stations KNXV-TV and KTVK are involved in a mid-air collision and crash while covering a car chase in downtown Phoenix. The crash occurred over Steel Indian School Park.	4	0	"Both pilots' failure to see and avoid the other helicopter. Contributing to this failure was the pilots' responsibility to perform reporting and visual tracking duties to support their station's ENG operation. Contributing to the accident was the lack of formal procedures for Phoenix-area ENG pilots to follow regarding the conduct of these operations."
2007-07-20	Sand Springs, Oklahoma, United States	KOTV	While performing low altitude flybys during a commercial shoot, a Bell 206B-3 helicopter's main rotor blade struck the satellite dish atop a news truck.	0	1	"The pilot's failure to maintain clearance with ground obstacles, which resulted in a blade strike. A contributing factor was the low altitude selected by the pilot."
2006-07-12	Taos, New Mexico, United States	KOB-TV	The helicopter landed nose first and rolled over while obtaining video of a search and rescue operation	0	0	the loss of tail rotor effectiveness during landing, and the pilot's delayed remedial action to counteract a right yaw
2006-06-26	Chino Hills, California, United States	contractor	The pilot heard a loud bang, landed the helicopter in a state park to investigate, upon taking off the helicopter rolled to the left and impacted the ground.	0	2	undetermined
2004-05-04	Brooklyn, New York, United States	WNBC-TV	A Eurocopter AS-350BA helicopter crash landed onto an apartment building rooftop after losing hydraulic pressure	0	3	Improper installation of the hydraulic pump drive belt which caused hydraulic system failure.
2004-03-07	Nagiso, Nagano, Japan	Shin-etsu Broadcasting(SBC)	Television news helicopter covering a car accident report. A Eurocopter AS-355 BA helicopter contacted a high voltage power line. Helicopter crashed on the river side, wrapped in flames. Pilot, mechanic and 2 station staff were killed.	4	0	ARAIC reports.
2003-05-08	Aurora, Colorado, United States	KMGH-TV	A Bell 206-L4 helicopter crashed after losing power during a simulated emergency landing at the Aurora Reservoir.	0	1	"Inadequate inflight planning/decision by the flight crew and the check pilot's failure to initiate remedial action in a timely manner".
2001-12-12	Vernon, Wisconsin, United States	WISN-TV	After covering a fire, the pilot of a Robinson R44 helicopter was flying back to airport in low visibility when the aircraft struck power lines and crashed on a highway.	1	2	"The pilot's continued flight into adverse weather and not maintaining altitude/clearance from the static line during cruise flight. Factors were the static wire, the darkness of night, the low ceiling, and the vehicle."
2000-06-23	Springdale, Ohio, United States	WLW	A 1989 Enstrom 280FX runs out of fuel while observing traffic along I-275. The pilot attempted to land on the roadway, but one skid landed in the grassy median, causing the helicopter to roll over.	0	0	Inadequate preflight and subsequent failure to monitor fuel supply
2000-03-26	Van Nuys, California, United States	KTTV	While covering a night time event, pilot radio'd hydraulic failure to other news helicopters in the area and opted to return to base rather than land at a closer airport.	0	2	hydraulic pressure loss
2000-03-06	Dallas, North Carolina, United States	WBTV	While covering a news event, the helicopter experienced several unanticipated right yaw excursions	0	0	Improper use of flight controls during an emergency landing
2000-03-03	South Miami-Dade County, Florida, United States	WTVJ	"Sky 6" A McDonnell Douglas HU-600N crashes after pitching downward and then pulled up into a steep ascent. Prior to the crash the pilot states over the radio to a nearby inflight helicopter "Watch this."	2	0	"The pilot's ostentatious display and in-flight decision to perform an abrupt low altitude pitch up maneuver (aerobatic flight). This resulted in the main rotor blades colliding with and separating the tail boom assembly while maneuvering, and the helicopters subsequent in-flight collision with terrain."
1999-11-17	Seattle, Washington, United States	KIRO-TV	helicopter collides with another (non-news) aircraft on a news gathering flight	0	0	failure to maintain separation
1999-06-25	Murrells Inlet, South Carolina, United States	WPDE-TV	While filming, a Boeing HU-369 helicopter crashes into a marsh.	0	3	"An inflight loss of control due to loss of tail rotor effectiveness as a result of the pilot's inadequate compensation for the winds and improper weather evaluation."
1998-12-03	Passaic, United States	WNBC-TV	A Eurocopter EC 135-P1 helicopter crashes into the Passaic River after a dual engine failure	0	2	"The pilot's failure to maintain proper rotor rpm and his improper in flight decision to enter autorotation due to his lack of knowledge of the power plant controls. Factors in the accident were the night conditions and the pilot's improper decision to fly through wake turbulence."
1998-10-13	Bowie, Maryland, United States	Metro Traffic	While engaged in traffic reporting, a Cessna R172K crashed into a house and burst into flames. Heavy fog was reported at the time of the accident.	1	1	"Pilot's failure to maintain adequate airspeed resulted in an inadvertent stall. Pilot's poor in-flight planning/decision and his continued VFR flight into instrument meteorological conditions".
1997-07-28	Philadelphia, Pennsylvania, United States	WPVI-TV	An AS350B "Chopper 6" was taking off to shoot aerials for the morning news when crashed when only a few feet in the air.	0	2	“Failure of the pilot to follow the checklist and verify the throttle was in the ON position before lift-off, which resulted in low rotor RPM and loss of control, while attempting to hover/taxi.”
1996-04-27	Nagano, Nagano, Japan	Nagano Broadcasting Systems(NBS) and TV Shinshu(TSB)	Two local television stations chartered a helicopter for a river bed fire. Two helicopters collided midair and crashed into the river bed. NBS's AS355 F1 had one pilot and one cameraman. TSB's AS350 B had one boarding pilot and one mechanic and 2 reporters. All passengers were killed.	6	0	ARAIC reports.
1994-01-13	Lakeland, Florida, United States	WESH-TV	While covering a circus train derailment, an Aerospatiale AS-350 helicopter makes an emergency landing and flips on its side at a ball field. The pilot and photographer on board were injured.	0	2	Pilot's failure to follow emergency procedure for an engine governor malfunction.
1993-08-18	Seattle, Washington, United States	KIRO (AM)	After experiencing a complete loss of power, pilot Paul Brendle attempts to glide his Enstrom F-28C traffic helicopter to a landing on the beach at Seward Park. He narrowly misses several sunbathers before crashing into a field at the west entrance to the park.	0	1	Shorted magneto condensers.
1993-01-11	Tonawanda, New York, United States	WGR	Traffic reporting Osage TH-55 helicopter struck power lines and fell into the Niagara River. Traffic reporter Mike Roszman and pilot Herman Kuhn were killed in the accident.	2	0	"Improper inflight planning/decision by the pilot and the failure to maintain clearance from an obstacle during flight. Factors related to the accident include poor visibility and weather conditions at dusk and the pilot's excessive airspeed for the conditions."
1991-12-07	Fuquay-Varina, North Carolina, United States	WTVD-TV	Returning from covering a high school football game in Wilmington. A Eurocopter AS350D helicopter lost power and crash landed in an open field.The sole survivor reported that the pilot reset an engine chip light 5-10 times 20–25 minutes prior to the crash.	3	1	Pilot's decision to continue flight after known engine problem and the subsequent seizure of the number two engine bearing.
1991-07-05	Phoenix, Arizona, United States	KTAR-AM	It was speculated that a model rocket or firework flew past the Robinson R22B helicopter which may have spooked pilot Mike Nuetzman. This may have caused him to lose control of the helicopter and crash into a house causing a subsequent fire.	1	0	"A divergence of the main rotor from its normal plane of rotation for an undetermined reason, which resulted in rotor contact to the cockpit."
1990-11-01	Solana Beach, California, United States	Metro Traffic	While engaging in traffic reporting, a Grumman AA-1B crashes into an embankment after making a series of steep turns at a low air speed.	2	0	"Inadvertent stall/spin. Factors in the accident were: The pilot's decision to allow the reporter passenger to fly the aircraft in a critical flight situation, his decision to allow the aircraft to descend to an altitude too low to allow for contingencies and the failure of the pilot in command to ensure that the aircraft was properly loaded."
1988-10-19	Deckers, Colorado, United States	KUSA-TV	A Bell 206L-3 helicopter crashes after hitting power lines.	2	0	Improper inflight planning and visual lookout by the pilot and adverse weather conditions.
1988-08-19	Riviera Beach, Florida, United States	WJNO & WRMF	While making traffic reports and flying at cruising speed, a Hughes 500 helicopter lost its tail rotor after a grinding noise was heard. While making an emergency landing the helicopter struck a palm tree.	0	2	Failure of the tail rotor gearbox due to a bird strike.
1987-09-21	Hailey, Idaho, United States	KTVB	A Cessna 210 returning reporter Mary Shore and photographer Daniel Sullivan from an assignment crashed on takeoff, sparking a 200-acre brush fire. Both passengers, as well as pilot Lynn Hoppe, were killed.	3	0	Pilot misjudged terrain during nighttime takeoff.
1986-11-25	Cincinnati, Ohio, United States	WKRC	A Bell 206B crashed in thick fog after traffic reporter Nancy McCormick pressured the pilot to take off despite his suggestion to delay. The crash occurred in a wooded area approximately one mile south of the departure point	2	0	Improper dispatch by the company/management and VFR flight into IMC conditions by the pilot.
1986-10-22	New York, United States	WNBC-AM	An Enstrom F-28F traffic helicopter crashed into the Hudson River after its engine failed. The pilot entered the helicopter into autorotation (glide) aiming to land in a parking lot, but the helicopter skidded through a fence, after touch down and it fell into the river. Traffic reporter Jane Dornacker was killed in the submerged helicopter, although the pilot freed himself and survived. Dornacker's last urgent words to her pilot, "Hit the water, hit the water!" were heard on the air.	1	2	Improper maintenance and the use of incorrect/unauthorized parts during a previous repair.
1986-06-16	Jacksonville, Florida, United States	WAPE-FM & WTLV-TV	A Hughes 369HE helicopter crashes during a morning drive broadcast killing reporter Julie Silver and pilot William Smith. Cameraman Brett Snyder was injured.	2	1	Failure of the tail rotor drive shaft coupling due to fatigue.
1986-06-04	Fullerton, California, United States	KFI	Shortly after takeoff, a Cessna 177B used for traffic reporting developed engine trouble and struck a semi truck. The craft burst into flames and the pilot/reporter was killed.	1	0	Reason for the occurrence undetermined. Improper inflight decision making and planning by the pilot. Inadequate air speed and stall.
1986-01-21	Ellendale, Minnesota, United States	ABC News	Helicopter hired by an ABC news crew agreed to fly in low visibility despite refusals by other pilots. Non-instrument rated pilot crashed in low visibility.	3	0	dark, visibility, pilot error
1985-05-05	Spokane, Washington, United States	KREM-TV	A Hughes 369D helicopter strikes a transmitting tower guy-wire and crashes at the station while taking off killing the replacement pilot and cameraman Gary Brown.	2	0	Inadequate planning and visual lookout by pilot. Failure to maintain clearance.
1984-09-19	Jecheon, South Korea	KBS	A television station helicopter struck a power line and crashed into the Namhan River.	5	0	
1984-09-13	Cherry Creek, Colorado, United States	KUSA-TV	A Bell 206L-3 crash landed into Cherry Creek after losing power.	0	3	"Fuel system, Fuel control..Fatigue; Maintenance, Installation..Improper..Other Maintenance Personnel"
1984-07-31	Akashi, Hyōgo, Japan	Asahi Broadcasting(ABC) & Mainichi Shimbun	Two news helicopters collided while covering a robbery story. ABC's chartered AS355F and Mainichi Shimbun own and operated Bell 206B collisions in the air. ABC-TV's helicopters crashed onto a building's roof, killing all on board. Mainichi's helicopter made a crash landing in a parking lot injuring the three on board. One person on the ground was also injured.	3	4(1 at Ground)	ARAIC reports.
1984-07-31	Furt (Pizol), Switzerland	Aviation Safety Network	A Bell 206L-1 Long Ranger helicopter crashed and killed the pilot and the other occupants were seriously injured. One occupant died a week later in hospital.	2	4	The pilot lost control of the helicopter in approach when trying to land, the tail rotor touched a tree tip and crashed into a gorge next to the landing site.
1983-12-03	Ft. Morgan, Colorado, United States	KUSA-TV	While attempting to land a Bell 206B helicopter during white out conditions, the main rotor struck the ground and the helicopter rolled over.	0	2	Flight into known adverse weather..initiated..pilot in command, Weather conditions..clouds, Weather conditions..fog, Overconfidence in personal ability..pilot in command, Terrain conditions..snow-covered, Weather conditions..whiteout
1983-10-24	Fletchers Awl, near Clermont, Queensland, Australia	Australian Broadcasting Corporation	A Cessna 310 crashed at Cumberland Downs (now known as Fletchers Awl) near Clermont, killing four Rockhampton-based ABC staff members. The plane was piloted by the ABC's regional manager. After making three circuits of the airstrip, the aircraft crashed 800 metres short of the airstrip. The crash killed the regional manager, a reporter, a camera operator and a sound technician.	4	0	The cause of the accident remains undetermined. Examination of the wreckage was hampered due to significant fire damage. Although it was found the engines were delivering little to no power at the time of impact, no defect or malfunction was found with the engines.
1983-10-18	Hudson, New Hampshire, United States	WCVB-TV	While en route to pick up film for the station, a Bell 206B III crashed and burst into flames in an apartment building parking lot. Prior to the crash the pilot issued a "Mayday, engine failure" call.	1	0	Failure of the engine turbine wheel due to fatigue.
1983-06-27	Kent, Washington, United States	KIRO (AM)	An Enstrom 280C crashes into a grassy field after pilot Paul Brendle lost control of the chopper's rear rotor. This is Brendle's second accident in 10 months while reporting on traffic for KIRO.	0	1	Inadequate maintenance resulting in worn tail rotor drive shaft spine coupling.
1983-01-17	Cincinnati, Ohio, United States	WCPO-TV	A Bell 206B runs out of fuel during an approach for landing in front of the station. It collided with a light pole and crashed onto an exit ramp of I-75.	0	0	Fuel exhaustion
1982-12-17	Larkspur, Colorado, United States	KOA-TV	Helicopter pilot/reporter Karen Key's Bell 206B helicopter crashes into a stand of trees in bad weather while covering a commuter plane crash. Both Key and her mechanic were killed.	2	0	VFR flight into IMC conditions and alcohol impairment by the pilot.
1982-08-09	Seattle, Washington, United States	KIRO (AM)	Pilot Paul Brendle crash lands the KIRO Copter, an Enstrom F-280, on the shores of Lake Washington after the aircraft loses power. The rear rotor rips away, shearing off the aluminum mast of a sailboat docked nearby, causing it to sink.	0	0	Throttle-activating arm improperly engaged.
1982-07-13	Charleston, South Carolina, United States	WCSC-TV	Shortly after takeoff, a Cessna 152 being used for traffic reporting crashes near the runway.	1	0	Airspeed not maintained and improper use of the controls by the pilot.
1982-04-07	Adelaide, Australia	Channel 9	A television station helicopter crashes while engaging in low level filming around a racecourse.	0	3	
1982-01-07	Lang Lang, Victoria, Australia	Channel 7	While filming a traffic accident at a low altitude, a Bell 206B helicopter goes out of control and crashes.	5		Loss of tail rotor effectiveness for unknown reasons.
1982-01-01	Pagosa Springs, Colorado, United States	KMGH-TV	Helicopter forced to make emergency landing due to poor weather conditions.	0	0	
1981-07-29	Summit Township, Pennsylvania, United States	WJET-TV	Robinson R22 helicopter crashed shortly after takeoff at the stations studio.	0	1	Interference of the cyclic flight control by passenger held video camera.
1980-05-26	Winslow, Washington, United States	KIRO-TV & KOMO	While covering Memorial Day traffic, KIRO's Bell 206B helicopter and KOMO's Cessna 172M airplane are involved in a mid-air collision. Although both aircraft are damaged, they are able to make emergency landings on a golf course.	0	0	The pilots of both aircraft cited for diverted attention from operation of aircraft and failure to see and avoid other aircraft.
1980-11-22	Waxahachie, Texas, United States	WFAA-TV	A Eurocopter AS350 helicopter crashes in fog/rain conditions	3	0	Continued VFR flight into adverse weather conditions and spatial disorientation.
1979-11-15	Vienna, Virginia, United States	WTOP	While engaged in traffic reporting, a Cessna 172N airplane runs out of fuel and crashes.	0	2	Improper preflight planning and mismanagement of fuel by the pilot.
1979-07-14	Philadelphia, Pennsylvania, United States	KYW-TV	A Bell 206B Jet Ranger helicopter loses power and crashes into the Schuylkill River while filming a "Jogathon"	2	2	Main drive shaft coupling failed due to unknown loss of lubricant
1977-12-27	Quincy, Massachusetts, United States	WEEI	While engaged in traffic reporting, a Hughes 269B helicopter loses power and crashes into an apartment building while attempting an emergency landing. A fire developed in the building following the crash.	2	0	Power plant for undetermined reasons and the failure of the pilot to maintain adequate rotor rpm.
1977-08-01	Los Angeles, California, United States	KNBC-TV	Pilot/reporter and former U2 spy plane pilot Francis Gary Powers along with cameraman George Spears are killed in the crash of a Bell 206B helicopter. The "KNBC News Telecopter" ran out of fuel which caused the accident.	2	0	Improper inflight decisions and mismanagement of fuel which lead to fuel exhaustion.
1972-06-26	New Cumberland, Pennsylvania, United States	WCAU	The main rotor blade separated from a Bell 206A at an approximate altitude of 300 ft	4	0	Material failure of the main rotor retention strap.
1971-08-10	Bellwood, Illinois, United States	WGN (AM)	The WGN Trafficopter, a Bell 47G-2A1 strikes a power pole and explodes over a vacant lot. Killed are Patrolman Irwin Hayden of the Chicago Police and pilot David Demarest.	2	0	Loss of control due to failure of tail rotor driveshaft yoke.
1971-05-20	Isle of Portland, United Kingdom		A Royal Navy Westland Wessex helicopter, registration number XM875, crashes while carrying press photographers covering NATO manoeuvres. Three of the five photographers were killed, while two others and the crew of two survived.	3	1	Engine failure while in the hover alongside USS Bigelow, ditched, rolled to starboard and sank in 48 ft of water.
1970-07-26	Japanese Alps, Japan	Yomiuri Shimbun	While on a "picture taking mission" a news helicopter crashed in flames 500 ft below the summit of Mount Yari killing two of the three on board. Two nearby mountain climbers were also injured.	2	3	
1970-02-01	Oshkosh, Wisconsin, United States		A Bell 47G-2 carrying a newspaper photographer crashes onto frozen Lake Winnebago and rolls over while covering an ice fishing jamboree. There were high wind gusts at the time of the accident.	0	3	Improper operation of the flight controls by the pilot.
1969-01-10	Astoria, Queens, United States	WOR	While in the middle of a live traffic broadcast, a Bell 47G-2 crashed through the roof of an apartment building. Following the crash a fire started in the building. The relief reporter/pilot, Frank McDermott realized the helicopter was in danger. He abruptly cut short his live report, telling the newscaster, "Take it back, John." McDermott either jumped or fell from the aircraft and was found dead in a yard across the street from the struck building.	1	0	Improper maintenance, tail rotor pitch control system over torqued.
1966-12-10	Sydney, Australia	ABN Channel 2	Bell 47 helicopter lost its tail rotor and crashed on top of a building while filming footage of Sydney Harbour and the Sydney skyline.	3	0	Metal fatigue of the tail rotor attaching bolt
1966-11-17	Castaic, California, United States	KNBC	A Hiller UH12L4 crashes while covering a previous crash.	0	0	Pilot failed to maintain proper rotor rpm.
1966-09-01	Tuxedo, Maryland, United States	WWDC	A traffic reporting Hughes 296B helicopter experienced engine failure and crashed shortly after takeoff. The craft struck a high voltage wire during its descent and burst into flames on impact.	2	0	Power plant failure of undetermined reasons and poor judgment along with selection of unsuitable terrain by the pilot.
1966-08-30	Los Angeles, United States	KMPC 710	A traffic reporting Bell 47G-4 is involved in a mid-air collision with a LAPD Bell 47G-4 helicopter over Dodger Stadium.	5	0	Both pilots failed to see and avoid due to sunglare.
1965-06-25	Seattle, Washington, United States	KOMO	Traffic reporter Ted Garlatz, flying a Cessna 210 for the KOMO Air Patrol, crash landed in a parking lot near Hec Edmundson Pavilion after losing power over the University District. The aircraft struck a bull rail, tearing out its landing gear, bending its propeller blades, and damaging the rear of the fuselage.	0	0	Engine failure and complete power loss.
1964-10-14	Houston, Texas, United States	KODA	The KODA Bird, a Hughes 269A used for traffic reports, crashed and erupted into flames. Announcer Ted Carr and pilot Billy Holmes were both killed.	2	0	Failure of main rotor blades.
1960-05-02	Chicago, Illinois, United States	WGN (AM)	A Bell helicopter used for airborne traffic reports suffered a rotor failure, striking a railroad overpass near the intersection of North Milwaukee Avenue and West Hubbard Street and bursting into flames. Wreckage was strewn over a one-block radius, with a large portion of fuselage landing near rush-hour traffic. Chicago Police Officer Leonard Baldy, who had become a popular radio personality, was killed along with pilot George Ferry.	2	0	

== Accidents occurring outside news-gathering activities ==
F = fatalities; I = injuries

Accident date	Location	Television station	Description	Fatalities	Injuries	Summary
2022-11-22	Charlotte, North Carolina, United States	WBTV	The Robinson R44 helicopter went into rapid descent and crashed in a grassy area adjacent to a southbound intersectional lane of I-77, as the pilot was conducting a news-gathering training simulation accompanied by a WBTV staff meteorologist.	2	0	Loose and improperly installed hardware during maintenance, which should have been caught in routine inspections.
2007-03-23	Rehoboth Beach, Delaware, United States	WWBT	The helicopter, not performing electronic news gathering at the time, struck a power line and crashed.	0	2	pilot failure to maintain lookout
2004-08-19	Collier County, Florida, United States	WINK-TV	The helicopter, returning from refueling in Miami, crashed in the Florida Everglades.	0	1	
1997-11-08	Portland, Oregon, United States	KATU	A Bell 206B, which was leased to the station, crashed while harvesting Christmas Trees.	0	0	"Excessive deceleration of the helicopter by the pilot-in-command, resulting in an in-flight main rotor blade strike on the helicopter's external load line and subsequent main rotor separation."
1992-02-12	Fort Collins, Colorado, United States	KUSA-TV	A Bell 206L-3 that was being taken for maintenance/repair due to a rotor vibration crashed into a reservoir.	2	1	Improper maintenance during a previous engine overhaul caused bearing failure and power loss .
1986-05-12	Pine Springs, Texas, United States	KDFW-TV	A Bell 206B crashed while returning with food for a station crew that was making reports from a remote area.	2	0	Improper maintenance resulting in the main drive shaft uncoupling.
1984-09-24	Kernersville, North Carolina, United States	WFMY-TV	While attempting to rescue an injured construction worker from a water tower being dismantled, a Bell 206B helicopter struck the tower and crashed.	2	0	Clearance misjudged by the pilot in command.
1979-09-11	Phoenix, Arizona, United States	KTVK	A Hughes 269A aircraft leased to the station that was shooting promotional photos of the helicopter and of the Phoenix area crash landed in a field next to the station.	0	0	Anti-torque pedals blocked by photo equipment (likely a camera). Overload failure listed as a factor.
