= Nagano News Helicopter Collision =

1996 Nagano News Helicopter Collision
Accident
- Date: April 27, 1996
- Summary: Mid-air collision due to pilot error on both aircraft
- Site: Nagano, Nagano, Japan
- Total fatalities: 6 (all)
- Total injuries: 0
- Total survivors: 0

First aircraft
- Type: Aérospatiale AS 350B
- Operator: TV Shinshu
- Registration: JA9792
- Occupants: 4
- Passengers: 2
- Crew: 2
- Fatalities: 4
- Survivors: 0

Second aircraft
- Type: Aérospatiale AS 350B
- Operator: Nagano Broadcasting Systems
- Registration: JA9633
- Occupants: 2
- Passengers: 1
- Crew: 1
- Fatalities: 2
- Survivors: 0

On April 27, 1996, a mid-air collision occurred over a mountainous area in Nagano, Nagano, Japan, between two Aérospatiale AS 350B news helicopters from television studios TV Shinshu and Nagano Broadcasting Systems. The journalists on board had been reporting on a brush fire early that morning. All 6 occupants onboard both aircraft were killed.

== Accident ==
Early that morning, TV Shinshu and Nagano Broadcasting Systems sent their news helicopters to cover the brush fire that had ignited recently in the mountainous and forested parts of Nagano. The first helicopter, JA9792, had one pilot, one mechanic, and two cameramen onboard. The second, JA9633, had one pilot and one cameraman. Both aircraft were flying at low altitudes, while also avoiding the smoke as well as other helicopters present at the time. However, at 5:42 AM UTC, JA9792 began to slow down, causing JA9633 to suddenly overtake it. It is believed that one of the pilots was not aware of the others position at the time, despite the weather being clear. Both aircraft collided and crash into the ground, killing all 4 occupants on the TVS helicopter and both on the NBS helicopter.

== See also ==
- Phoenix news helicopter collision - Another news helicopter collision that occurred in Phoenix 11 years later.
- 2026 Chatsworth Eurocopter AS350 crash
