= TSB =

== Banking ==
A trustee savings bank is a type of financial institution.

- In the United Kingdom:
  - Lloyds TSB, the name used by Lloyds Bank in the United Kingdom from 1999 to 2013
  - Trustee Savings Bank, a bank in the United Kingdom that merged with Lloyds Bank in 1995 to form Lloyds TSB
  - TSB Bank (United Kingdom), a bank that split from Lloyds Bank in 2013 and divested through a stock market flotation
- In other countries:
  - Permanent TSB, formerly Irish Life and Permanent and originally Trustee Savings Bank in the Republic of Ireland
  - TSB (New Zealand), formerly the Taranaki Savings Bank

== Other uses ==
- Thiosymbescaline
- Transportation Safety Board of Canada
- Transportation Safety Bureau of Hungary
- Treib–Seelisberg-Bahn, a funicular railway, Uri, Switzerland
- TV. Shinshu, a television station in Nagano Prefecture, Japan
- Telesistema Boliviano, a defunct Bolivian television channel
- The Types of the Scandinavian Medieval Ballad classification
- Tryptic Soy Broth
