= Tsubakuro =

Tsubakuro may refer to:

- Mount Tsubakuro
- Tsubakuro, a great dane in the manga Kacchū no Senshi Gamu
- Tsubakuro Jinnai of the television series Sanbiki ga Kiru!
- Tsubakuro Swallow, the mascot of the Tokyo Yakult Swallows baseball team
