= Mount Kasa =

Mountain in Gifu Prefecture, Japan

- 笠ヶ岳
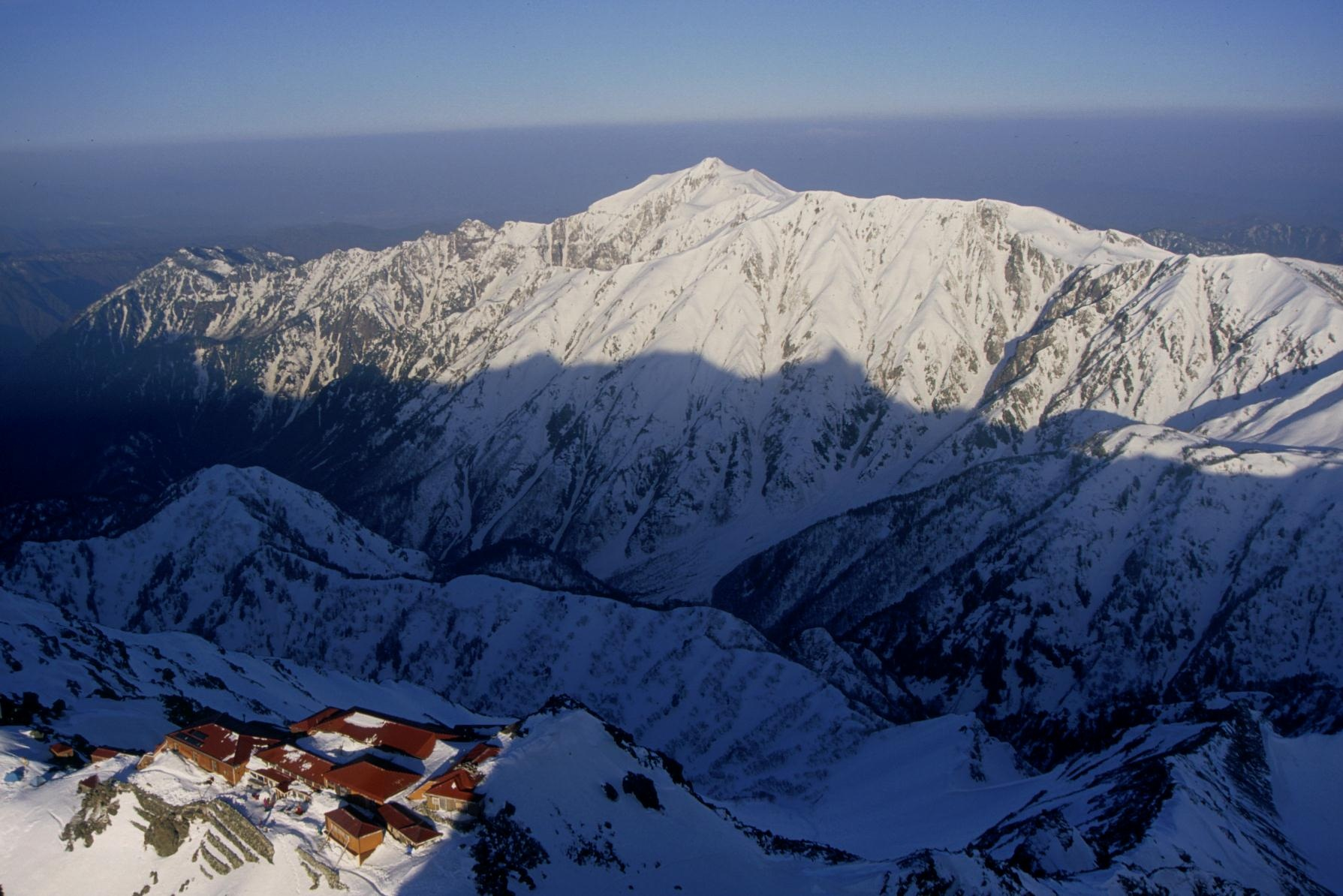
- Mount Kasa from Mount Yari

Highest point
- Elevation: 2,897.48 m (9,506.2 ft)
- Listing: List of mountains in Japan; 100 Famous Japanese Mountains
- Coordinates: 36°18′55″N 137°37′00″E

Naming
- Language of name: Japanese
- Pronunciation: [kasaɡatake]

Geography
- Location within Japan
- Location: Takayama, Gifu Prefecture; Japan
- Parent range: Hida Mountains
- Topo map(s): Geospatial Information Authority 25000:1 笠ヶ岳; 50000:1 上高地

Climbing
- First ascent: 1683(Enkū)
- Easiest route: Hike

Mount Kasa (笠ヶ岳, Kasa-ga-take) is one of the 100 Famous Japanese Mountains, reaching the height of 2,897 m (9,505 ft). It is situated in Japan's Hida Mountains in Gifu Prefecture and in Chūbu-Sangaku National Park. The shape of the mountain looks like the Umbrella("Kasa"-笠) in the triangle. Therefore, it became this name. There are many mountains with same name in Japan and this is the tallest.

== History ==
- In 1683 – It was said that Enkū had opened this mountain.
- In 1823 – The Buddhist monk Banryū climbed to the top, and placed a bronze Buddha statue at the top in 1824.
- In 1894, August 2 – Englishman Walter Weston had climbed on the top.
- In 1913, August – Usui Kojima had climbed on the top.
- In 1932 – Mountain hut of Kasa Mountain Cottage (笠ヶ岳山荘) was constructed near the top.
- In 1934, December 4 – This area was specified to the Chūbu-Sangaku National Park.
- In 1964 – "Kasa-shin-dō"(笠新道) of the new Trail had been made. Then it is the main route to the Mount Kasa.
- In 1993 – Postage stamp of Mount Kasa and Takayama Festival was put on the market by the Ministry of Posts and Telecommunications (Japan).
- In 1995 – Sumie Tanaka (田中澄江 Tanaka Sumie) completed New Flowers of the 100 Mountains, which featured many of the Alpine plant(Trollius japonicus シナノキンバイ and others) on Mount Kasa.

== Mountaineering ==
=== Main ascent routes ===
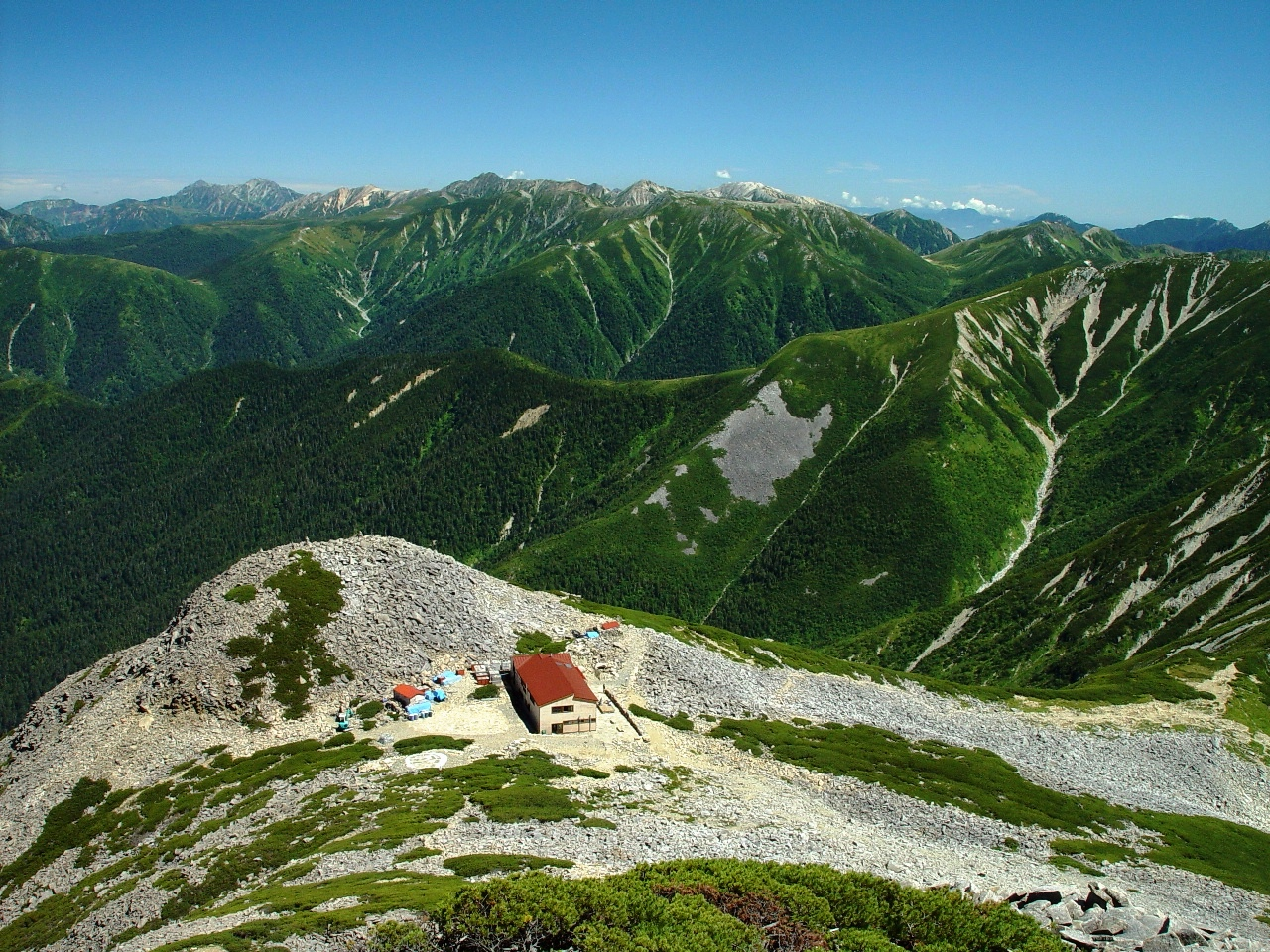
Hida Mountains and Mountain hut (Kasa Mountain Cottage) from the top

There are three climbing routes to the top of the mountain.

Kasa-shin-dō
Shin-Hotaka Onsen (新穂高温泉) – Mount Nukedo – Kasa Mountain Cottage – Mount Kasa
Valley Kuriya
Nakao-Kōgen-guchi (中尾高原口) – Valley Kuriya – Mount Kasa
Traverses Route of Northern Japanese Alps (Hida Mountains) from north side
Mount Sugoroku – Mount Yumiori – Mount Nukedo – Kasa Mountain Cottage – Mount Kasa

=== Mountain hut ===
Thera are several Mountain hut around Mount Kasa. Around Shin-Hotaka-Onsen, there are many hot spring (Onsen) to take the tiredness and to relax.

- Kasa Mountain Cottage (笠ヶ岳山荘) – near the top (with Campsite)
- Wasabi-Daira Hut (ワサビ平小屋) – near the entrance of Kasa-shin-dō
- Kagami-Daira Mountain Cottage (鏡平山荘) – near the Pond Kagami(鏡池)
- Sugoroku Hut (双六小屋) – between Mount Sugoroku and Mount Momisawa (with Campsite)

== Geography ==
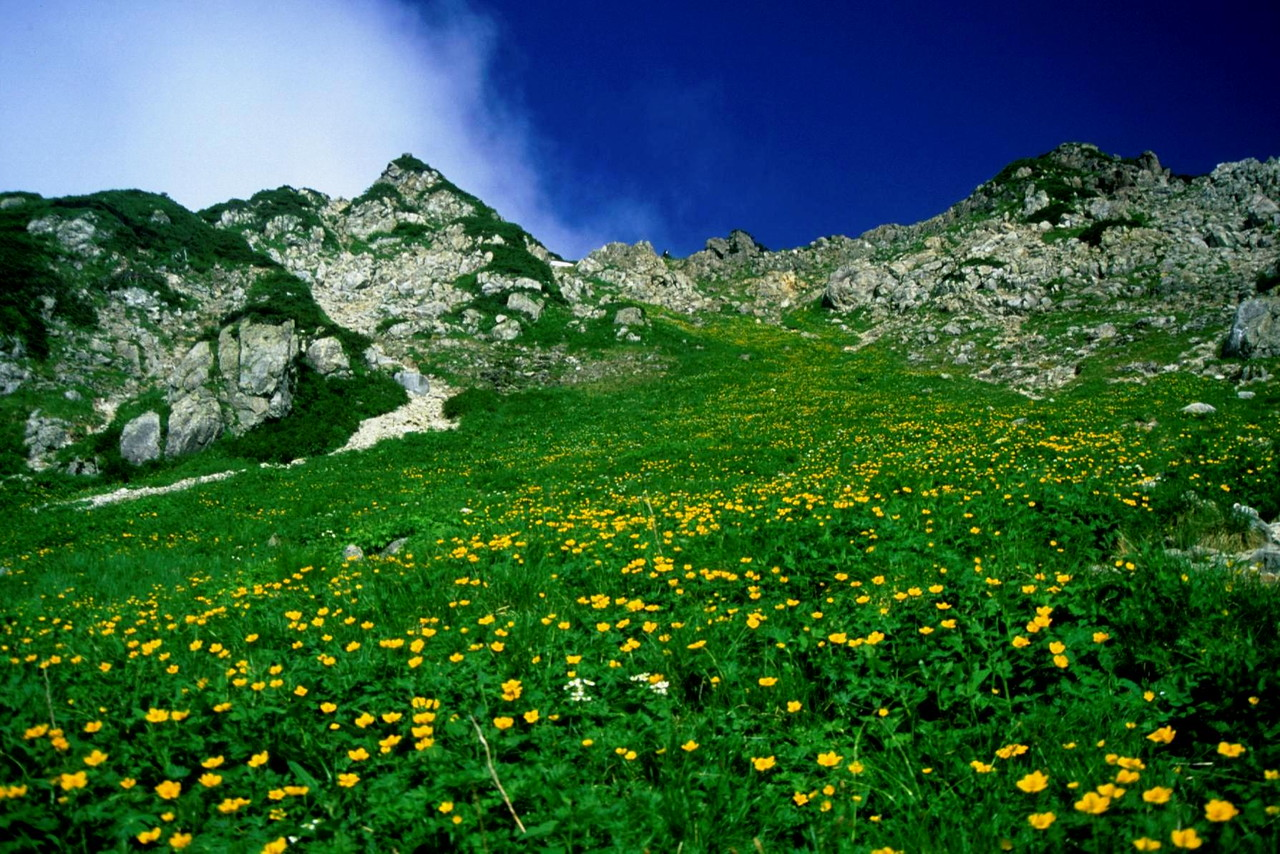
Alpine plant (Trollius japonicus シナノキンバイ) in Shakushi-daira around Mount Kasa

It is the mountain that consists chiefly of the Porphyry (geology). The higher region than Shakushi-daira (杓子平) are the forest limit of Siberian Dwarf Pine belt, and the place that Alpine plant grows naturally and Rock Ptarmigan live.

=== Nearby mountains ===
Mount Kasa is on the subridge (from Mount Sugoroku) of the main ridge line in the southern part of the Hida Mountains. There are Mount Shakujō and Mount Ōkibanotsuji on the southern ridge.

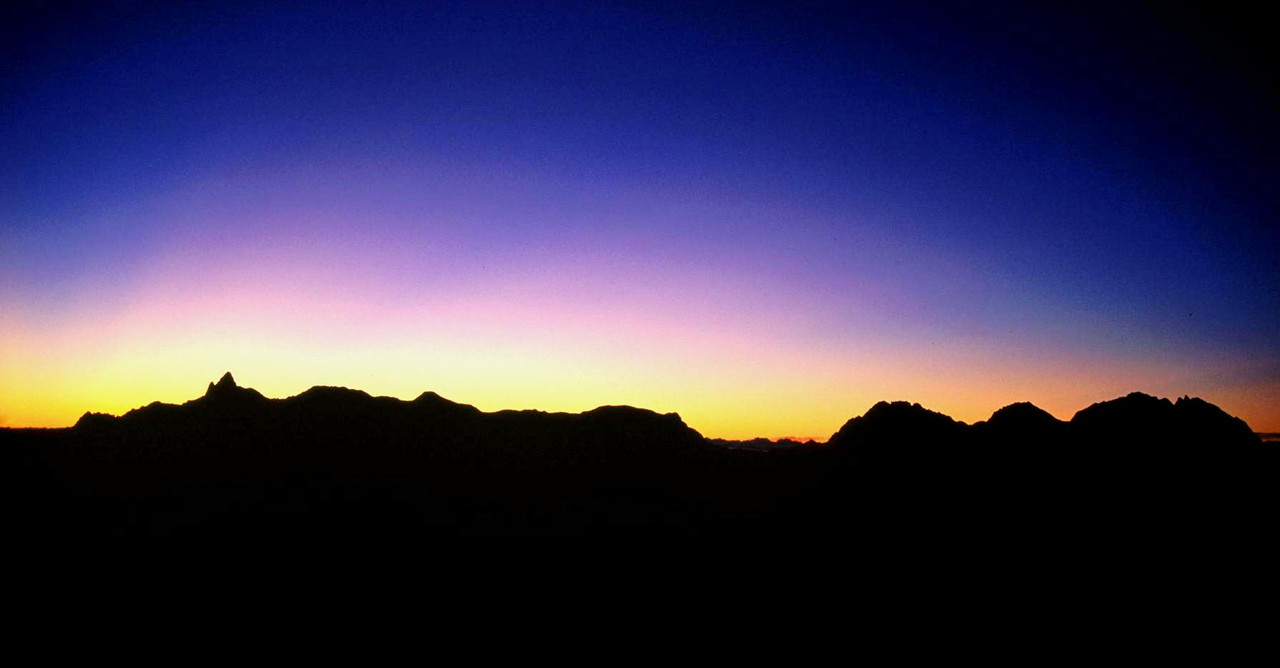
Mount Yari and Mount Hotaka from Mount Kasa before the sunrise

Image	Mountain	Elevation	Distance from the Top	Note
	Mount Yari 槍ヶ岳	3,180 m (10,433 ft)	9.2 km (5.7 mi)	100 Famous Japanese Mountains
	Mount Kasa 笠ヶ岳	2,897 m (9,505 ft)	0 km (0.0 mi)	100 Famous Japanese Mountains
	Mount Shakujō 錫杖岳	2,168 m (7,113 ft)	3.8 km (2 mi)	Rock climbing on the rock peak
	Mount Hotaka 穂高岳	3,190 m (10,466 ft)	9.2 km (6 mi)	Tallest mountain in Hida Mountains; 100 Famous Japanese Mountains
	Mount Haku 白山	2,702 m (8,865 ft)	72.3 km (44.9 mi)	Tallest mountain in Ishikawa Prefecture; 100 Famous Japanese Mountains

=== Rivers ===
The mountain is the source of the following rivers, each of which flows to the Sea of Japan.

- Sugoroku River (a tributary of the Jinzū River)
- Gamata River (tributaries of the Takahara River)

== Gallery ==
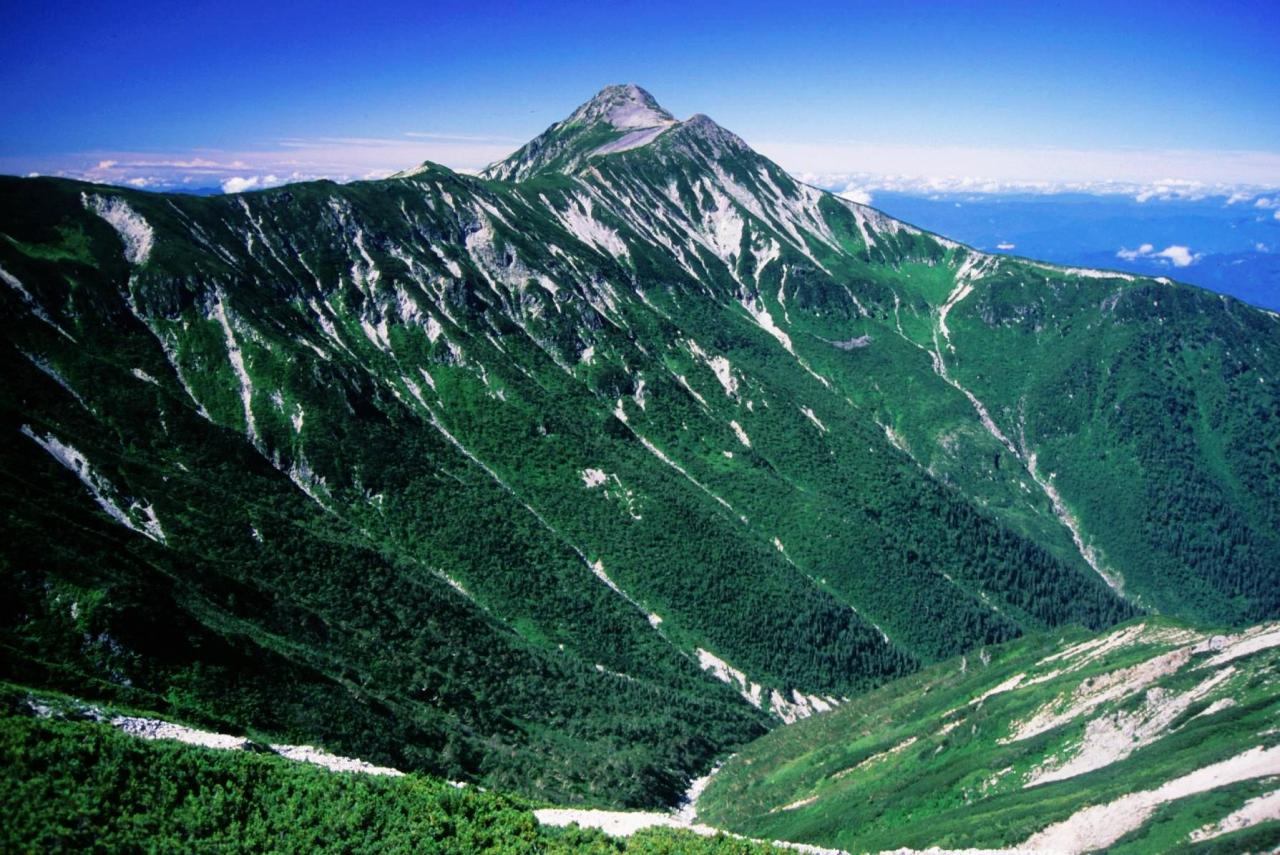
Mount Kasa
from Mount Nukedo

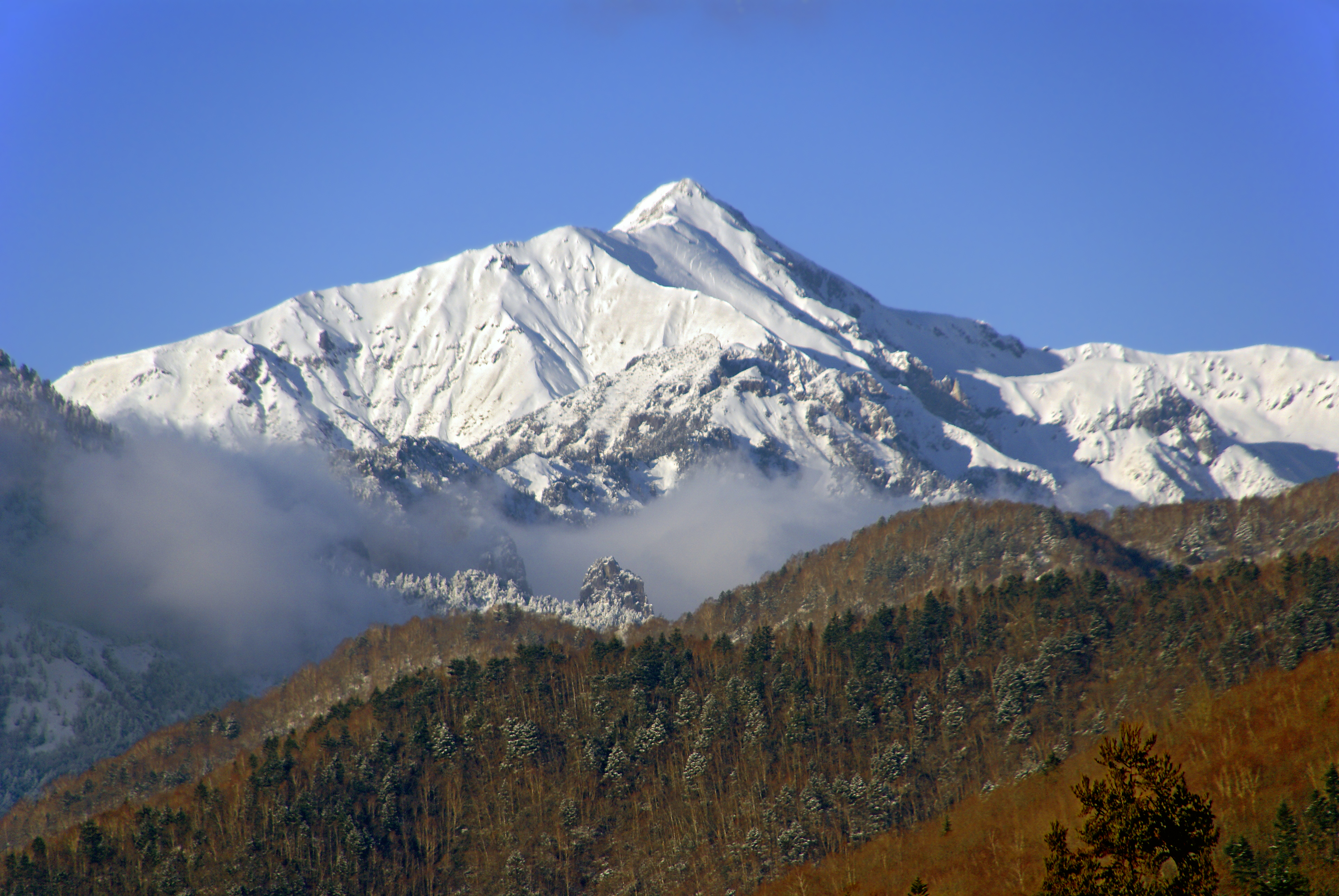
Mount Kasa
from south

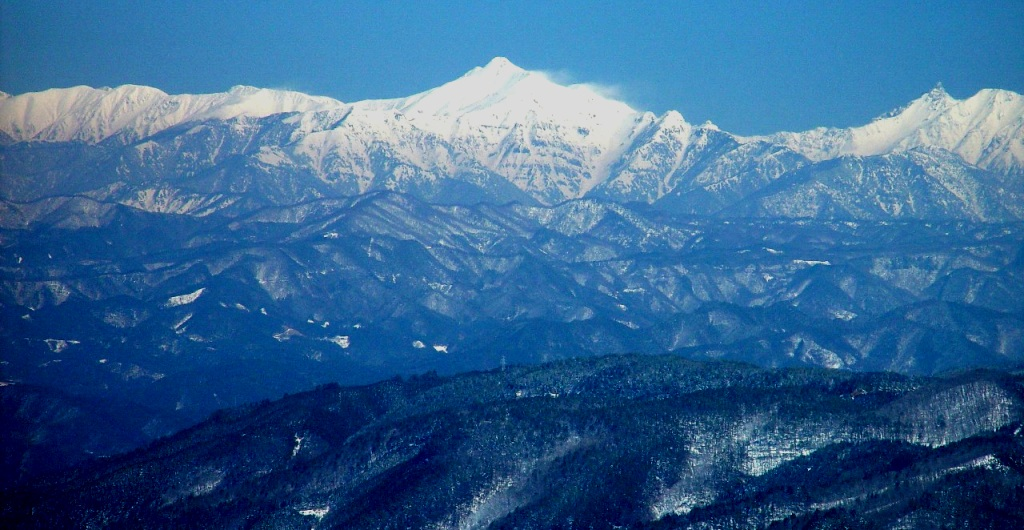
Mount Kasa
from Mount Kurai

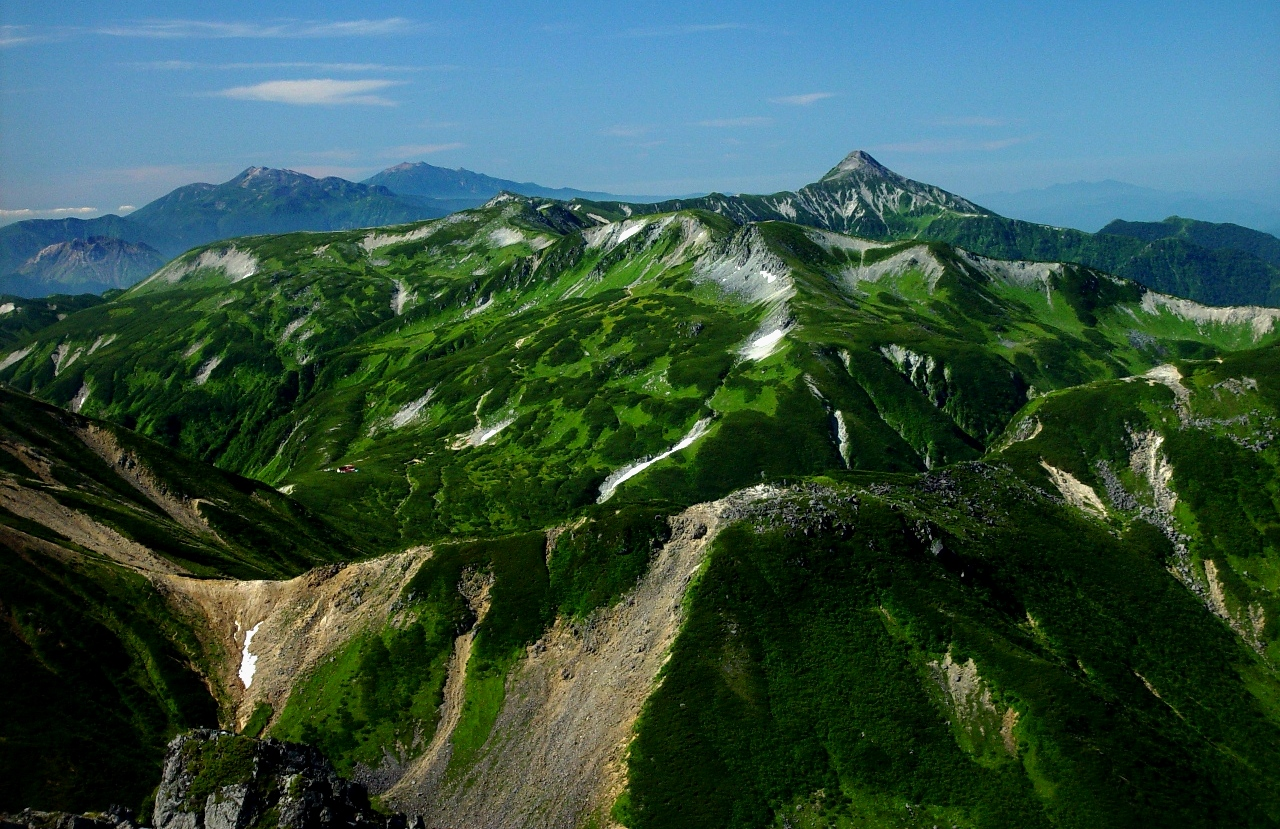
Mount Kasa and Hida Mountains
from Mount Suisho

== See also ==
- Hida Mountains
- Chūbu-Sangaku National Park
- List of mountains in Japan
- 100 Famous Japanese Mountains
