= Phoenix news helicopter collision =

2007 aviation accident

2007 Phoenix news helicopter mid-air collision
- Photograph circulated by AP of the two helicopters falling moments after the collision

Accident
- Date: July 27, 2007
- Summary: Mid-air collision due to pilot error on both aircraft
- Site: Phoenix, Arizona, U.S.; 33°29′48″N 112°4′14″W
- Total fatalities: 4 (all)
- Total injuries: 0
- Total survivors: 0

First aircraft
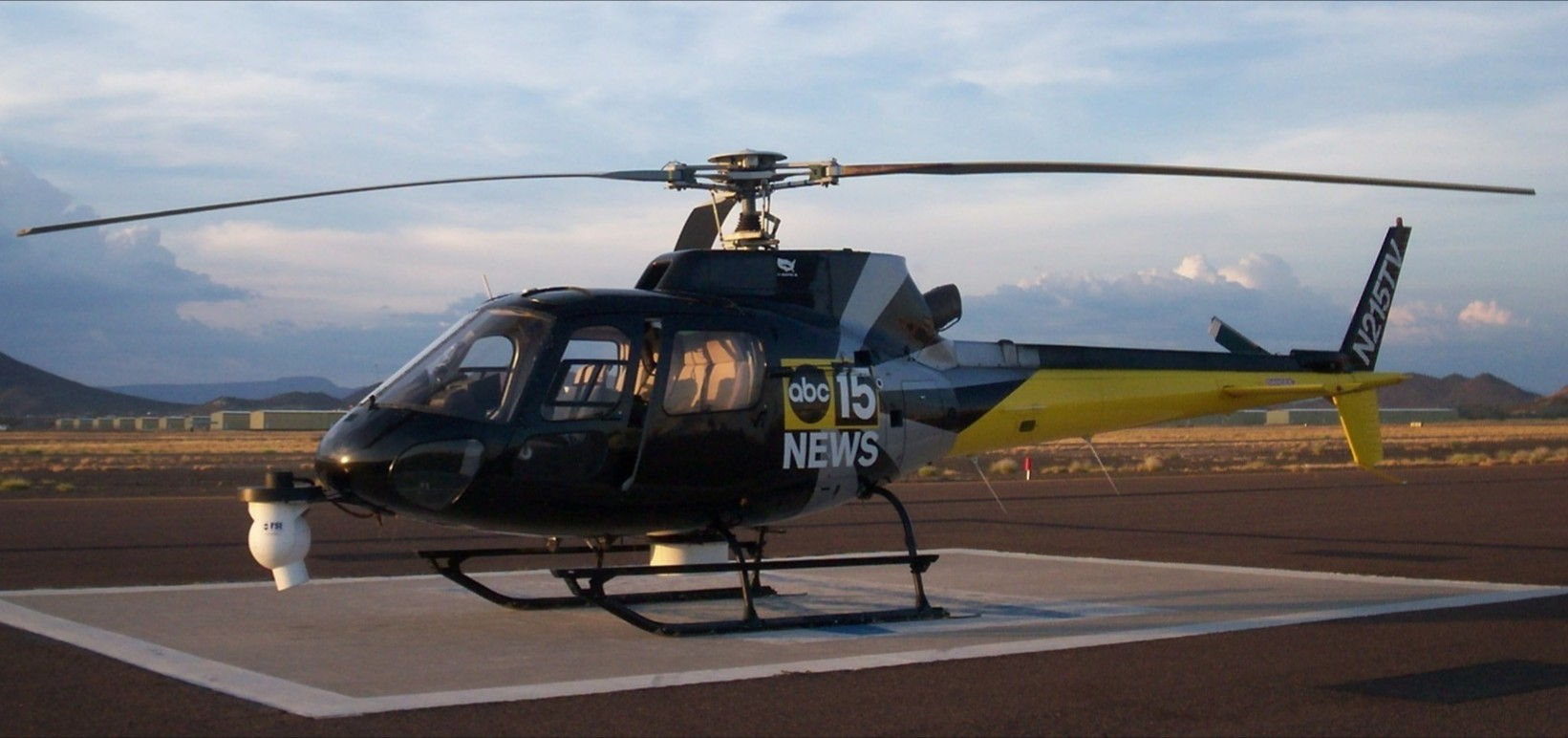
- N215TV, the Eurocopter AS-350 B2 involved in the accident, in May 2005
- Type: Eurocopter AS-350 B2
- Name: Chopper15
- Operator: KNXV-TV
- Registration: N215TV
- Occupants: 2
- Passengers: 1
- Crew: 1
- Fatalities: 2
- Survivors: 0

Second aircraft
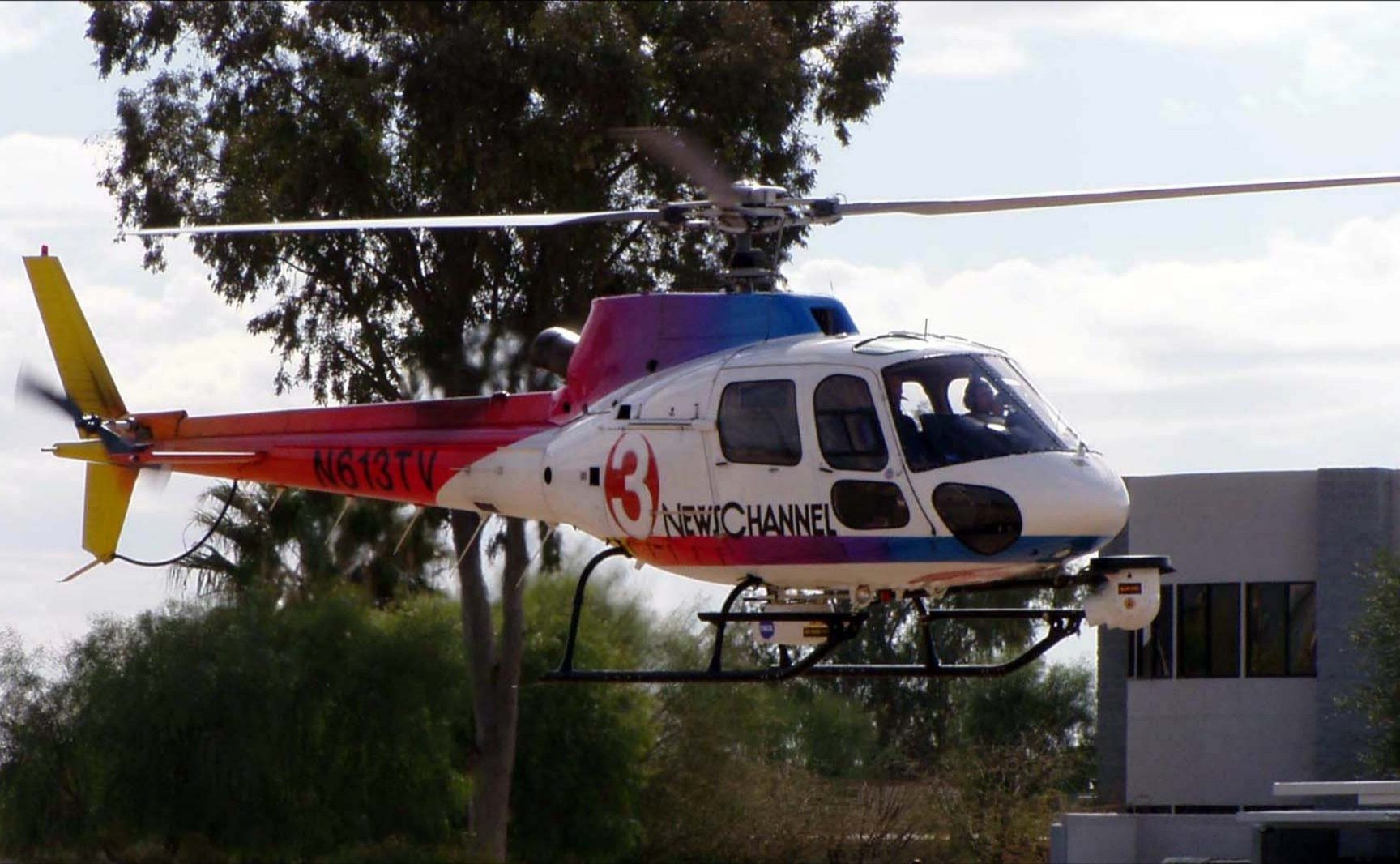
- N613TV, the Eurocopter AS-350 involved in the accident, in February 2007
- Type: Eurocopter AS-350
- Name: Newschopper3
- Operator: KTVK
- Registration: N613TV
- Occupants: 2
- Passengers: 1
- Crew: 1
- Fatalities: 2
- Survivors: 0

On July 27, 2007, two AS-350 AStar helicopters from television stations KNXV-TV and KTVK collided in mid-air over Phoenix, Arizona, United States, while covering a police pursuit. On board the two aircraft were four people, all of whom were killed: pilot Craig Smith and photographer Rick Krolak from KNXV, and pilot Scott Bowerbank and photographer Jim Cox from KTVK. No casualties were reported on the ground.

== Accident ==
KNXV-TV was the ABC affiliate for Phoenix, Arizona, and its surrounding area, while KTVK was an independent news station. The two helicopters were broadcasting a police pursuit on live television when the collision occurred at 12:46:18 p.m. MST. Both aircraft came down in the Steele Indian School Park in central Phoenix.

Three news helicopters from the city's other stations KSAZ, KPNX, and KPHO were in the area and within seconds began reporting on the crash. A photograph, taken moments after the collision and showing both helicopters plunging towards the ground, was circulated by the Associated Press.

== Aftermath and investigation ==
External videos
- Speculative Computer simulation of the crash

The collision was investigated by the National Transportation Safety Board (NTSB), which concluded that "...the probable cause of this accident was both pilots' failure to see and avoid the other helicopter. Contributing to this failure was the pilots' responsibility to perform reporting and visual tracking duties to support their station's electronic news gathering (ENG) operation. Contributing to the accident was the lack of formal procedures for Phoenix-area ENG pilots to follow regarding the conduct of these operations."

The day of the accident, Phoenix Police Chief Jack Harris brought up the possibility that the suspect in the chase the two helicopters were covering could "be held responsible for any of the deaths from this tragedy". However, in 2010, when the suspect pleaded guilty to 35 crimes stemming from the 2007 police chase, he was not charged with the deaths of the helicopter occupants.

Two years after the accident, the families of pilot Scott Bowerbank and photographer Jim Cox announced that a settlement for an undisclosed amount was agreed to with US Helicopters, the owners of the KNXV helicopter. Both legal teams released a video reconstructing details of the accident. The computer-generated footage simulates the KTVK helicopter being struck from behind by the KNXV helicopter.

== Legacy ==
At the time of the accident, five news helicopters were covering the police incident, and specific protocols (called Sharp Echo) for radio communications between news helicopters and Phoenix control tower were already in force in an attempt to coordinate their activity.

As of 2017, the five English-language commercial television stations in Phoenix share two helicopters, and policy is to separate aircraft by 500–1000 feet of altitude. The pilot no longer undertakes reporting duties; their sole responsibility is to fly the aircraft. Additionally, technological improvements such as long-range camera lenses allow helicopters to stay farther back from news stories.

== See also ==
- List of news aircraft accidents and incidents
- Nagano News Helicopter Collision
- 2026 Chatsworth Eurocopter AS350 crash
