= Banryū =

Jōdo-shū Buddhist monk

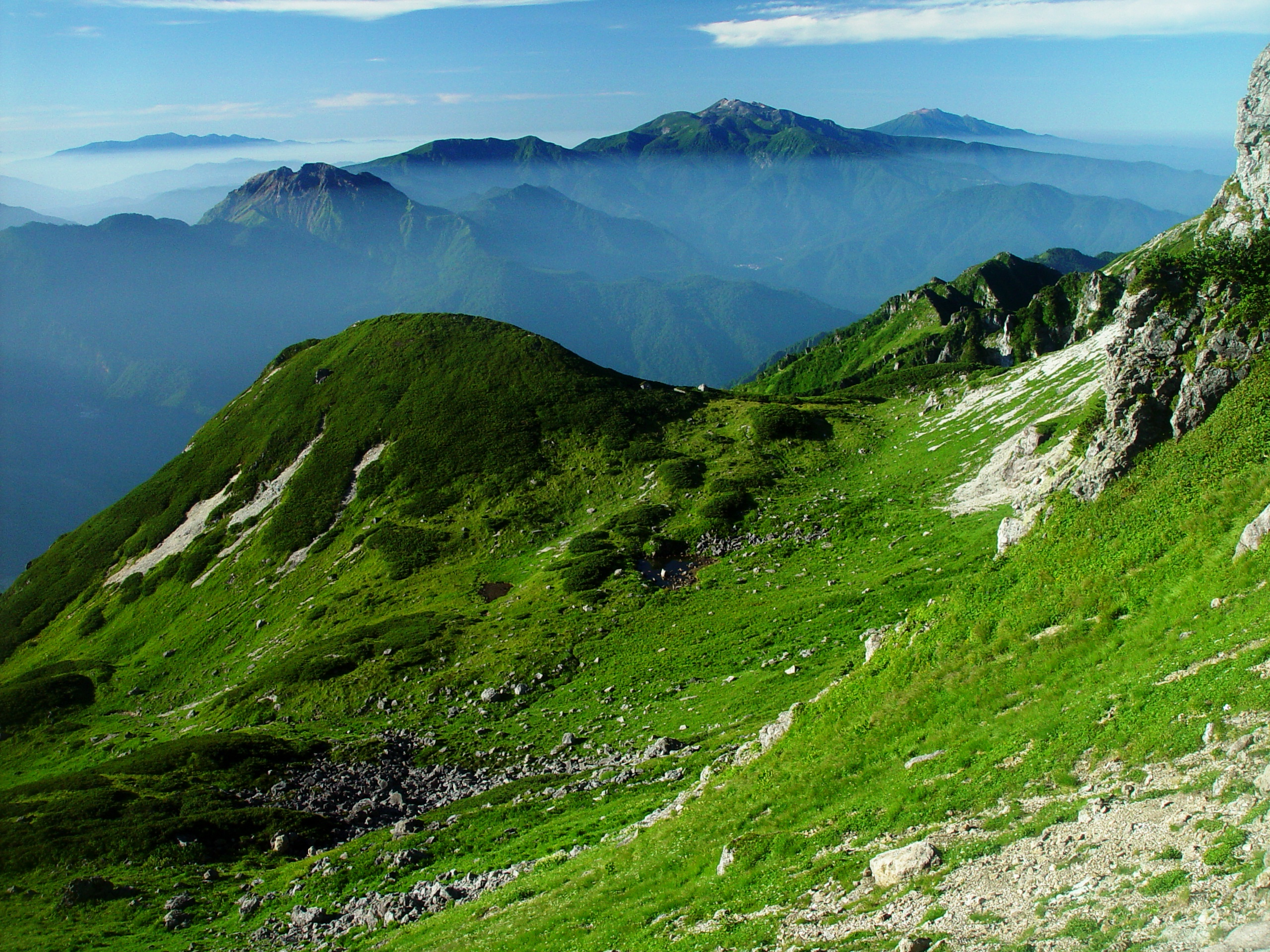
The eastern side of Mt. Kasa is named Banryu-daira after Banryū.

Banryū (播隆) (1786 - November 14, 1840) was a Jōdo-shū Buddhist monk and mountaineer in the latter half of the Edo period. He was respectfully referred to as Banryu Shonin (播隆上人) by his followers.

He is known for having practiced asceticism in places such as Mount Yari, Mount Katachi, Mount Igi, Mount Asama, and Metoba Falls.

== Biography ==
In 1786 he was born in Kawachi Village, Shinkawa County, Etchu Province (present-day Toyama Prefecture, Toyama City) to a family of Ikko-shu followers.

In 1804, at the age of 19, he became a monk and trained in Kyoto and Osaka.

In 1823, he climbed Mt. Kasa with his followers from Hida.

In 1824, he climbed Mt. Kasa for the fourth time and placed a bronze Buddha statue on the peak. He decided to climb Mt. Yari, which faces the mountain.

In 1826, through the mediation of the priest at Genkō-ji Temple in Shinano, he came to Ogura Village, Azumi County (present-day Misato District, Azumino City) and stayed at the home of village official Nakata Kuzaemon, where he told him of his intention to climb Mount Yari. He received approval, and was guided by Kuzaemon's son-in-law, Nakata Matajiro, who was knowledgeable about mountaineering. He entered Kamikochi via Mount Otaki and Mount Chō, and went up the Azusa River, climbing to the shoulder of Mount Yari using the cave in Yarisawa as a base. This time it ended as a reconnaissance, but he traveled around the country for two years afterwards collecting donations.

July 20, 1828: Banryū became the first person to successfully ascend Mount Yari. A shrine was erected and a triad of statues of Amida Nyorai, Kannon Bodhisattva, and Manjusri Bodhisattva was enshrined.

Not content with reaching the summit himself, he climbed Mt. Yari many times after that, so that many people could reach the peak, and he worked hard to attach a rope to the difficult part of the tip of the mountain and to attach a stronger iron chain. When he planned to attach the iron chain, the Tenpo famine happened to occur, and some villagers blamed his plan and forbade the plan from being carried out, but after that, a good harvest year came and the plan was resumed.

In his later years, he lived at a temple and engaged in missionary activities and climbed Mount Yari again, but fell ill on his fifth attempt.

In 1840, he died at Ichizaemon Hayashi's house in the side main camp in Ota-juku, Mino (now Minokamo City, Gifu Prefecture). His tomb and a monument to his poem, “The tip of the spear that the world fears will soon rise, I have begun to climb it."
