= 5-Thioasymbescaline =

Clinical data
- Other names: 5-TASB; 3,4-Diethoxy-5-methylthiophenethylamine; 3-Ethoxy-4-ethoxy-5-methylthiophenethylamine; 3-EtO-4-EtO-5-MeS-PEA
- Routes of administration: Oral
- Drug class: Serotonergic psychedelic; Hallucinogen
- ATC code: None

Pharmacokinetic data
- Duration of action: ~8 hours

Identifiers
- IUPAC name: 2-(3,4-diethoxy-5-methylsulfanylphenyl)ethanamine
- CAS Number: 90132-47-1
- PubChem CID: 44349932
- ChemSpider: 23206360
- UNII: QZ7W4UH6FS
- ChEMBL: ChEMBL126583
- CompTox Dashboard (EPA): DTXSID60658369

Chemical and physical data
- Formula: C_{13}H_{21}NO_{2}S
- Molar mass: 255.38 g·mol^{−1}
- 3D model (JSmol): Interactive image
- SMILES: CCOC1=C(C(=CC(=C1)CCN)SC)OCC
- InChI: InChI=1S/C13H21NO2S/c1-4-15-11-8-10(6-7-14)9-12(17-3)13(11)16-5-2/h8-9H,4-7,14H2,1-3H3; Key:WEGXTQPSIDDJRM-UHFFFAOYSA-N

5-Thioasymbescaline (5-TASB), also known as 3,4-diethoxy-5-methylthiophenethylamine, is a psychedelic drug of the phenethylamine and scaline families related to mescaline. It is the analogue of asymbescaline in which the methoxy group at the 5 position has been replaced with a methylthio group. The drug is one of three possible thioasymbescaline (TASB) positional isomers, the others being 3-thioasymbescaline (3-TASB) and 4-thioasymbescaline (4-TASB).

In his book PiHKAL (Phenethylamines I Have Known and Loved) and other publications, Alexander Shulgin lists 5-TASB's dose as approximately 160 mg orally and its duration as about 8 hours. The drug has been variously described as having lower potency than mescaline to having twice the potency of mescaline.

The effects of 5-TASB have been reported to include hints of strangeness, neurological hyperactivity, slight physical effects, extremities feeling warm, slight lightheadedness, slight hyperreflexia, slight diarrhea, and extended physical malaise. It was said that there was more physical than mental and that it was not all entirely nice. In addition, it was said that the effects are real, but the person didn't want to go any higher. It was concluded that the drug's somatic effects overshadowed the psychological effects. Besides hints of strangeness, no hallucinogenic or other perceptual effects were described.

The chemical synthesis of 5-TASB has been described.

5-TASB was first described in the scientific literature by Shulgin and Peyton Jacob III in 1984. Subsequently, it was described in greater detail by Shulgin in PiHKAL in 1991.

== See also ==
- Scaline
- 3-Thioasymbescaline
- 4-Thioasymbescaline
