= Tiprenolol =

Names
- IUPAC name 1-(2-Methylsulfanylphenoxy)-3-(propan-2-ylamino)propan-2-ol

Identifiers
CAS Number	26481-51-6
3D model (JSmol)	Interactive image
ChEMBL	ChEMBL2111163
ChemSpider	35152
PubChem CID	38353
UNII	R86K1U4O7J
CompTox Dashboard (EPA)	DTXSID60928271
- InChI: InChI=1S/C13H21NO2S/c1-10(2)14-8-11(15)9-16-12-6-4-5-7-13(12)17-3/h4-7,10-11,14-15H,8-9H2,1-3H3 Key: CSUNLSYSEQIDMO-UHFFFAOYSA-N
- SMILES: CC(C)NCC(COC1=CC=CC=C1SC)O

Properties
Chemical formula	C_{13}H_{21}NO_{2}S
Molar mass	255.38 g·mol^{−1}
- Except where otherwise noted, data are given for materials in their standard state (at 25 °C [77 °F], 100 kPa). Infobox references

Tiprenolol is a beta adrenergic receptor antagonist.
