= Thioasymbescaline =

Thioasymbescaline (TASB) may refer to the following:

- 3-Thioasymbescaline (3-TASB)
- 4-Thioasymbescaline (4-TASB)
- 5-Thioasymbescaline (5-TASB)

== See also ==
- Scaline
- Thiomescaline
- Thioescaline
- Thiometaescaline
- Thiosymbescaline
