= 3-Thioasymbescaline =

Clinical data
- Other names: 3-TASB; 3-Ethylthio-4-ethoxy-5-methoxyphenethylamine; 4-Ethoxy-3-ethylthio-5-methoxyphenethylamine; 3-EtS-4-EtO-5-MeO-PEA
- Routes of administration: Oral
- Drug class: Serotonergic psychedelic; Hallucinogen; Stimulant
- ATC code: None

Pharmacokinetic data
- Onset of action: 2–3 hours
- Duration of action: 10–18 hours

Identifiers
- IUPAC name: 2-(4-ethoxy-3-ethylsulfanyl-5-methoxyphenyl)ethanamine
- CAS Number: 90132-49-3
- PubChem CID: 44349933
- ChemSpider: 23206361
- UNII: Y3XGG4LY3K
- ChEMBL: ChEMBL126586

Chemical and physical data
- Formula: C_{13}H_{21}NO_{2}S
- Molar mass: 255.38 g·mol^{−1}
- 3D model (JSmol): Interactive image
- SMILES: CCOC1=C(C=C(C=C1SCC)CCN)OC
- InChI: InChI=1S/C13H21NO2S/c1-4-16-13-11(15-3)8-10(6-7-14)9-12(13)17-5-2/h8-9H,4-7,14H2,1-3H3; Key:LIOWJFZFWZIZBL-UHFFFAOYSA-N

3-Thioasymbescaline (3-TASB), also known as 3-ethylthio-4-ethoxy-5-methoxyphenethylamine, is a psychedelic and stimulant drug of the phenethylamine and scaline families related to mescaline. It is the analogue of asymbescaline in which the ethoxy group at the 3 position has been replaced with an ethylthio group. The drug is one of three possible thioasymbescaline (TASB) positional isomers, the others being 4-thioasymbescaline (4-TASB) and 5-thioasymbescaline (5-TASB).

In his book PiHKAL (Phenethylamines I Have Known and Loved) and other publications, Alexander Shulgin lists 3-TASB's dose as approximately 160 mg orally and its duration as 10 to 18 hours. Its onset is approximately 2 to 3 hours. The drug has been variously described as having lower potency than mescaline to having twice the potency of mescaline.

The effects of 3-TASB have been reported to include "people's faces looking like marvelous parodies of themselves", considerable time slowing, extensive stimulant effects like feeling active, alertness, and excitement, appetite loss, nausea, occasional diarrhea, other physical symptoms, and insomnia. It was described as having a "lot of adrenergic push" and a "strong adrenergic component". The drug was also described as possibly being representative of a "shift [among psychedelic phenethylamines] from sensory effects over to out-and-out stimulation" and as possibly having amphetamine-like actions. The somatic effects were said to overshadow its psychological effects.

The chemical synthesis of 3-TASB has been described.

3-TASB was first described in the scientific literature by Shulgin and Peyton Jacob III in 1984. Subsequently, it was described in greater detail by Shulgin in PiHKAL in 1991.

== See also ==
- Scaline
- 4-Thioasymbescaline
- 5-Thioasymbescaline
