= Mount Tsubakuro =

Mountain in Azumino, Nagano Prefecture, Japan

- 燕岳
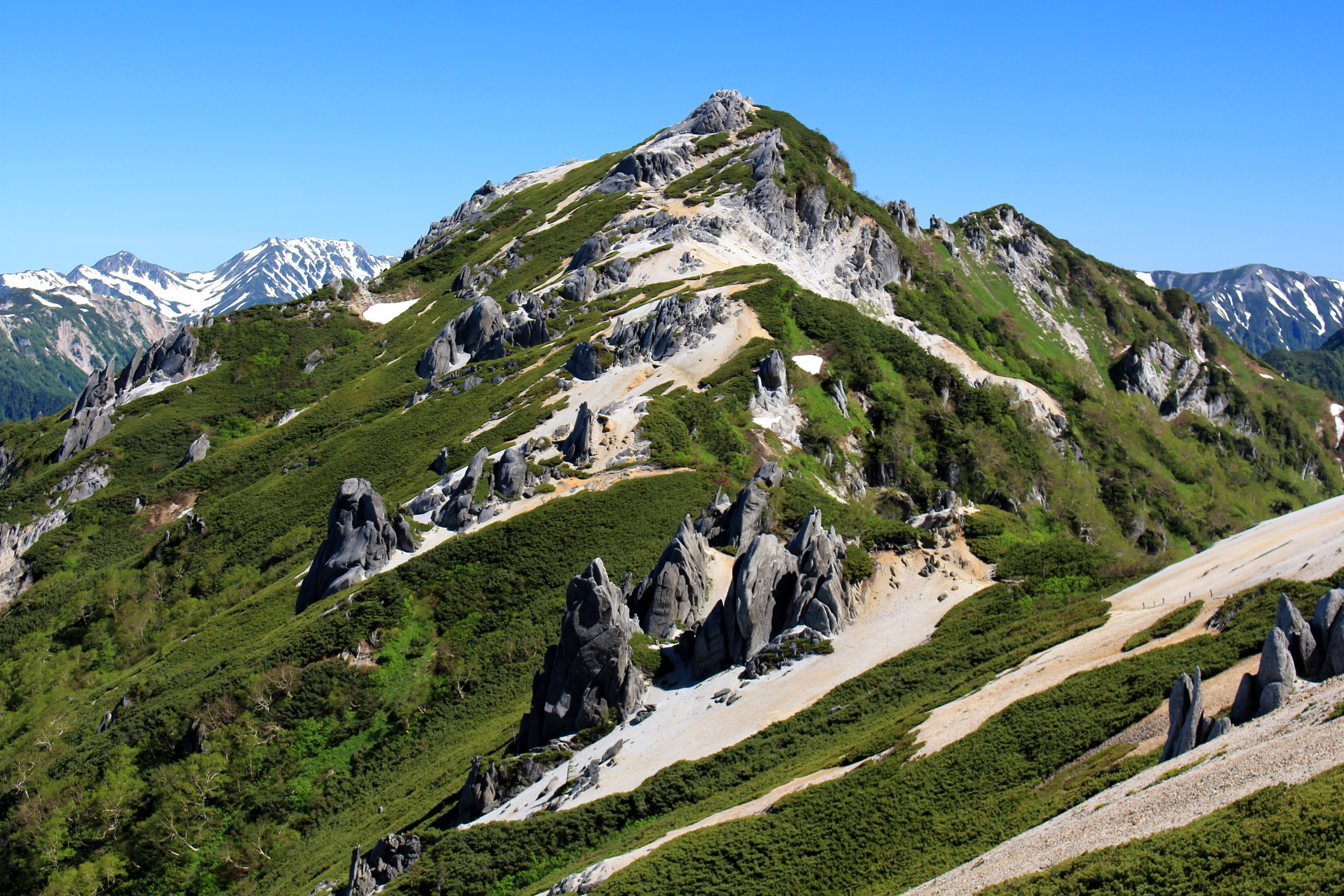
- Mount Tsubakuro (June 2015)

Highest point
- Elevation: 2,762.85 m (9,064.5 ft)
- Listing: List of mountains in Japan
- Coordinates: 36°24′25″N 137°42′46″E

Naming
- Language of name: Japanese
- Pronunciation: [tsɯbakɯɾodake]

Geography
- Location within Japan
- Location: Ōmachi, Nagano Prefecture; Azumino, Nagano Prefecture, Japan
- Parent range: Hida Mountains
- Topo map(s): Geospatial Information Authority 25000:1 槍ヶ岳; 50000:1 槍ヶ岳

Climbing
- Easiest route: Hike

Mount Tsubakuro (燕岳, Tsubakuro-dake) is a 2,763-metre-high (9,065 ft) mountain in Azumino, Nagano Prefecture, Japan. It is situated in Japan's Hida Mountains in Nagano Prefecture.

It was specified for Chūbu-Sangaku National Park on December 4, 1934. Granite forms the unique body with white sands and sharp rocks exposed at the top. Kassen One (ridge) is a steep trail challenging to climbers ascending from Nakabusa Hot Springs.

== Mountain hut ==
The mountain climbing trail between Mount Tsubakuro and Mount Yari is called Main Street (表銀座, Omote-Ginza) owing to its extensive use over time. It has two mountain huts along the way. Tsubakuro mountain cottage (燕山荘, Enzansō) is near the summit and is one of the oldest mountain huts in Japan, completed in 1921.

Enzanso (Tsubakuro mt. cottage)	Kassen-goya (Kassen hut)	Trail as seen from Mt. Ohensho

== Geography ==
=== Nearby mountains ===
The following are the main mountains in the surrounding area:

Image	Mountain	Elevation	Distance from the Top	Note
	Mt. Gaki 餓鬼岳	2,647.19 m (8,685 ft)	5.0 km (3.1 mi)	200 Famous Japanese Mountains
	Mt. Tsubakuro 燕岳	2,839.58 m (9,316 ft)	0 km (0.0 mi)	200 Famous Japanese Mountains
	Mt. Otensho 大天井岳	2,921.91 m (9,586 ft)	4.7 km (2.9 mi)	200 Famous Japanese Mountains
	Mt. Jōnen 常念岳	2,857 m (9,373 ft)	9.1 km (5.7 mi)	100 Famous Japanese Mountains
	Mt. Yari 槍ヶ岳	3,180 m (10,433 ft)	9.3 km (5.8 mi)	100 Famous Japanese Mountains

=== Rivers ===
The rivers flowing on the slopes of Mount Tsubakuro are mountain streams flowing towards the Shinano River basin. The Nakabusa River rises on the eastern side and tributaries of the upper stream of the Takase River rise on the western slopes.

== Gallery ==
=== View from Mount Tsubakuro ===
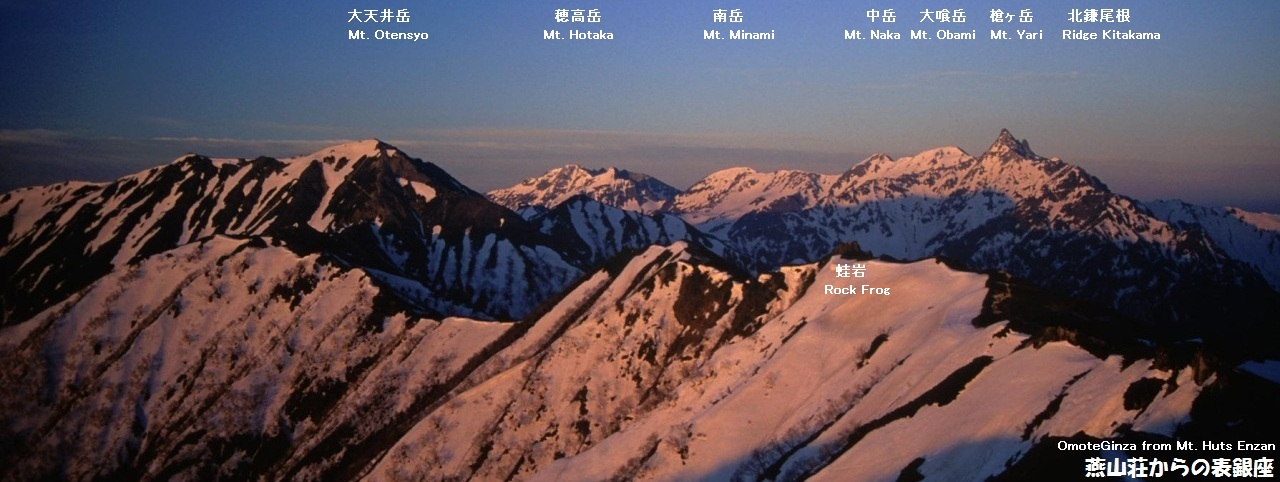
Mount Otensho and Mount Yari, seen from Enzansō

=== Scenery of Mount Tsubakuro ===
Top	in Spring	Mt. Tubakuro & Hut	in Autumn

== See also ==
- Chūbu-Sangaku National Park
- Hida Mountains
- List of mountains in Japan
