= 3-Thiosymbescaline =

Clinical data
- Other names: 3-TSB; 3-Ethylthio-4-methoxy-5-ethoxyphenethylamine; 3-EtS-4-MeO-5-EtO-PEA
- Routes of administration: Oral
- ATC code: None

Pharmacokinetic data
- Duration of action: Unknown

Identifiers
- IUPAC name: 2-(3-ethoxy-5-ethylsulfanyl-4-methoxyphenyl)ethanamine
- CAS Number: 90132-51-7
- PubChem CID: 44374939
- ChemSpider: 21106412
- UNII: 28S8H9WR9W
- ChEMBL: ChEMBL349363

Chemical and physical data
- Formula: C_{13}H_{21}NO_{2}S
- Molar mass: 255.38 g·mol^{−1}
- 3D model (JSmol): Interactive image
- SMILES: CCOC1=C(C(=CC(=C1)CCN)SCC)OC
- InChI: InChI=1S/C13H21NO2S/c1-4-16-11-8-10(6-7-14)9-12(17-5-2)13(11)15-3/h8-9H,4-7,14H2,1-3H3; Key:BTJFGKUKBHSKHI-UHFFFAOYSA-N

3-Thiosymbescaline (3-TSB), also known as 3-ethylthio-4-methoxy-5-ethoxyphenethylamine, is a chemical compound of the phenethylamine and scaline families related to mescaline. It is the analogue of symbescaline in which the ethoxy group at the 3 position has been replaced with an ethylthio group. The compound is one of two possible thiosymbescaline (TSB) positional isomers, the other being 4-thiosymbescaline (4-TSB).

In his book PiHKAL (Phenethylamines I Have Known and Loved) and other publications, Alexander Shulgin lists 3-TSB's dose as greater than 200 mg orally and its duration as unknown. The compound produced no effects whatsoever at a dose of up to 200 mg orally.

The chemical synthesis of 3-TSB has been described.

3-TSB was first described in the scientific literature by Shulgin and Peyton Jacob III in 1984. Subsequently, it was described in greater detail by Shulgin in PiHKAL in 1991.

== See also ==
- Scaline
- 4-Thiosymbescaline
