= 4-Thioasymbescaline =

Clinical data
- Other names: 4-TASB; 3-Ethoxy-4-ethylthio-5-methoxyphenethylamine; 3-EtO-4-EtS-5-MeO-PEA
- Routes of administration: Oral
- Drug class: Serotonergic psychedelic; Hallucinogen
- ATC code: None

Pharmacokinetic data
- Duration of action: 10–15 hours

Identifiers
- IUPAC name: 2-(3-ethoxy-4-ethylsulfanyl-5-methoxyphenyl)ethanamine
- CAS Number: 90109-51-6
- PubChem CID: 44349945
- ChemSpider: 23206368
- UNII: ZAD5HH55KJ
- ChEMBL: ChEMBL126860

Chemical and physical data
- Formula: C_{13}H_{21}NO_{2}S
- Molar mass: 255.38 g·mol^{−1}
- 3D model (JSmol): Interactive image
- SMILES: CCOC1=CC(=CC(=C1SCC)OC)CCN
- InChI: InChI=1S/C13H21NO2S/c1-4-16-12-9-10(6-7-14)8-11(15-3)13(12)17-5-2/h8-9H,4-7,14H2,1-3H3; Key:IUZSEPUWBBUJME-UHFFFAOYSA-N

4-Thioasymbescaline (4-TASB), also known as 3-ethoxy-4-ethylthio-5-methoxyphenethylamine, is a psychedelic drug of the phenethylamine and scaline families related to mescaline. It is the analogue of asymbescaline in which the ethoxy group at the 4 position has been replaced with an ethylthio group. The drug is one of three possible thioasymbescaline (TASB) positional isomers, the others being 3-thioasymbescaline (3-TASB) and 5-thioasymbescaline (5-TASB).

In his book PiHKAL (Phenethylamines I Have Known and Loved) and other publications, Alexander Shulgin lists 4-TASB's dose as 60 to 100 mg orally and its duration as 10 to 15 hours. The drug is said to have approximately 4 times the potency of mescaline.

The effects of 4-TASB have been reported to include "fantasy stuff to music", "some jumpy stuff to music", music being "lovely", "pictures not particularly exciting", extremely negative eyes-closed fantasies while trying to sleep, irritability, agitation, twitchiness, uncomfortableness, feeling disturbed, feeling that nerve endings are raw and active, possible neurological hyperreflexia, feeling continuous electrical impulses traveling between nerve endings, continuous erotic arousability seemingly related to the nervous system oversensitivity, "heartbeat wrongness", "respiration wrongness", water retention, diarrhea, and other physical symptoms. It was described as very intense, as a very threatening material, and one person remarked "DO NOT REPEAT". It was concluded that although 4-TASB had "quite a bit of life", it had more overshadowing physical problems than psychic virtue.

The chemical synthesis of 4-TASB has been described.

4-TASB was first described in the scientific literature by Shulgin and Peyton Jacob III in 1984. Subsequently, it was described in greater detail by Shulgin in PiHKAL in 1991.

== See also ==
- Scaline
- 3-Thioasymbescaline
- 5-Thioasymbescaline
