= 4-Thiosymbescaline =

Clinical data
- Other names: 4-TSB; 3,5-Diethoxy-4-methylthiophenethylamine; 3-EtO-4-MeS-5-EtO-PEA
- Routes of administration: Oral
- ATC code: None

Pharmacokinetic data
- Duration of action: Unknown

Identifiers
- IUPAC name: 2-(3,5-diethoxy-4-methylsulfanylphenyl)ethanamine
- CAS Number: 90109-45-8
- PubChem CID: 44375085
- ChemSpider: 21106394
- UNII: K4Z3LUQ768
- ChEMBL: ChEMBL160066
- CompTox Dashboard (EPA): DTXSID50658555

Chemical and physical data
- Formula: C_{13}H_{21}NO_{2}S
- Molar mass: 255.38 g·mol^{−1}
- 3D model (JSmol): Interactive image
- SMILES: CCOC1=CC(=CC(=C1SC)OCC)CCN
- InChI: InChI=1S/C13H21NO2S/c1-4-15-11-8-10(6-7-14)9-12(16-5-2)13(11)17-3/h8-9H,4-7,14H2,1-3H3; Key:OMJVPFLTCMALSV-UHFFFAOYSA-N

4-Thiosymbescaline (4-TSB), also known as 3,5-diethoxy-4-methylthiophenethylamine, is a chemical compound of the phenethylamine and scaline families related to mescaline. It is the analogue of symbescaline in which the methoxy group at the 4 position has been replaced with a methylthio group. The compound is one of two possible thiosymbescaline (TSB) positional isomers, the other being 3-thiosymbescaline (3-TSB).

In his book PiHKAL (Phenethylamines I Have Known and Loved) and other publications, Alexander Shulgin lists 4-TSB's dose as greater than 240 mg orally and its duration as unknown. The effects of 4-TSB have been reported to include a "real effect" and a little spaciness at 80 mg orally, twinges at 160 mg orally, and "no effects at all" at 240 mg orally. It was concluded that the compound is probably inactive.

The chemical synthesis of 4-TSB has been described.

4-TSB was first described in the scientific literature by Shulgin and Peyton Jacob III in 1984. Subsequently, it was described in greater detail by Shulgin in PiHKAL in 1991.

== See also ==
- Scaline
- 3-Thiosymbescaline
