= 1977 Encino helicopter crash =

Helicopter crash killing Francis Gary Powers

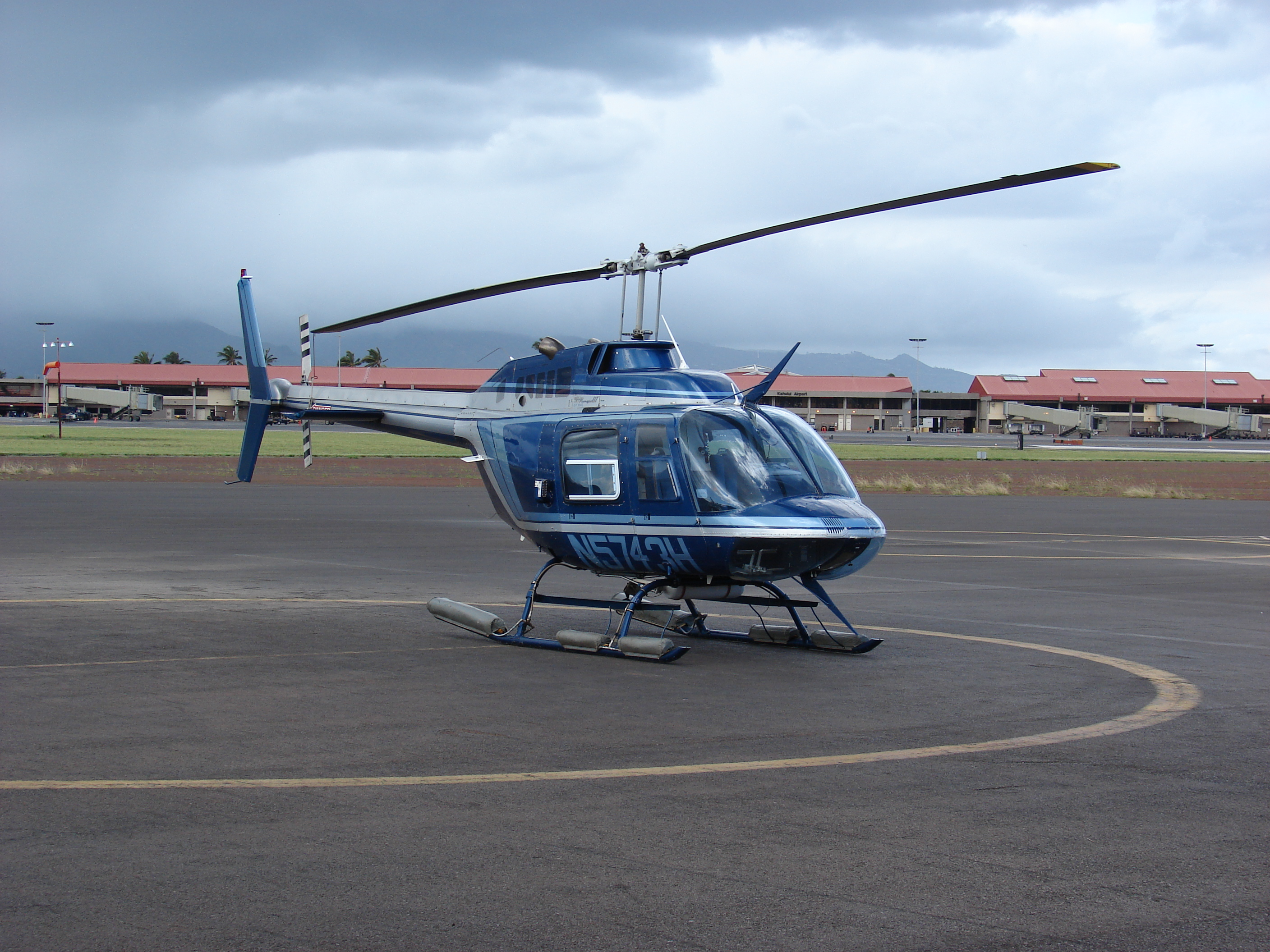
- A Bell 206B similar to the accident aircraft

Accident
- Date: August 1, 1977
- Summary: Pilot error
- Site: Encino, Los Angeles, United States; 34°10′01″N 118°29′00″W

Aircraft
- Aircraft type: Bell 206
- Operator: NBC INC
- Registration: N4TV
- Flight origin: Burbank, California
- Passengers: 1
- Crew: 1
- Fatalities: 2
- Survivors: 0

On August 1, 1977, a Bell 206 news helicopter piloted by Francis Gary Powers ran out of fuel and crashed into a field near Encino, Los Angeles, California, killing Powers and the aircraft's only passenger, cameraman George Spears.

== Accident ==
The Bell 206 JetRanger was operating under Federal Aviation Regulation Part 91 on a noncommercial flight and departed Hollywood Burbank Airport in Burbank on the morning of August 1, 1977, to provide aerial coverage and record video after a wildfire in Santa Barbara, 86 nautical miles (160 km; 100 mi) to the west. At approximately 12:25 pm PDT, Powers contacted KNBC and stated he had completed gathering footage, was returning to Burbank, and believed he had enough fuel for the return trip. A few minutes later, Powers radioed the control tower at Van Nuys Airport requesting clearance to land there due to low fuel; permission was granted, but the aircraft failed to arrive.

The helicopter was now at 800 feet (240 m) above ground level (AGL) and almost out of fuel. Realizing he would not make the airport, Powers began searching for a spot to land in the heavily built-up area. At 12:35 pm, Powers pointed the aircraft towards the Sepulveda Dam Recreational Area and prepared to auto-rotate down to an open area. The Bell 206 has superior autorotation characteristics, but as he descended, it is surmised that Powers saw a group of teenagers playing on a baseball diamond and made an abrupt maneuver to avoid them. Powers' last radio transmission was "TV four just lost –". At approximately 50 feet (15 m) AGL, the tail rotor fell off and Powers was ejected from the helicopter. At 12:36 pm, the aircraft hit the ground about 50 yards (45 m) from where the boys were playing, gouged a trench twenty feet (6 m) long in the earth, and flipped upside-down. Powers and Spears were both killed, but nobody on the ground was injured.

== Aircraft ==
The helicopter involved in the accident was a Bell 206B JetRanger serial number 433 built in 1969.

It was powered by a single Allison model 250-C20B turboshaft engine, rated at 420 shaft horsepower. The aircraft Certificate Issue Date was September 19, 1974, and it had been modified with the addition of an externally mounted 360-degree video camera and video recording equipment. Registered as N4TV, it was commonly referred to as the "Telecopter."

== Crew ==
The helicopter pilot was 47-year-old Francis Gary Powers, who began flying the JetRanger when he joined KNBC in November 1976. Best known for piloting an unsuccessful reconnaissance mission over the Soviet Union in 1960, Powers held a valid commercial pilot's license and was instrument rated with 7,193 total flight hours, including 381 in the Bell 206.

== Aftermath and investigation ==
The helicopter was completely destroyed during the crash. When firefighters arrived, they removed the helicopter's smoking battery from the fuselage for safety. The wreckage was moved to the Wayne Airframe Aviation Company in Van Nuys. A video recorder and four video cassettes were found inside the helicopter. The investigators hoped the tapes might have clues to the reason for the crash but apparently the recorder had not been operating at the time of the incident. The aircraft had not been equipped with a flight data recorder (FDR) or a cockpit voice recorder (CVR).

During the National Transportation Safety Board (NTSB) investigation, no evidence of failure or malfunction of the aircraft or any of its systems prior to the crash was found. Further examination of the engine found approximately five fluid ounces of jet fuel in the entire fuel system and that the engine had flamed out due to fuel starvation. The final report from the NTSB lists the probable causes as improper in-flight decisions and mismanagement of fuel by the pilot in command which led to fuel exhaustion. Also listed was improper operation of flight controls during the power-off autorotation.

According to one report, Powers had reported that the helicopter's fuel gauge was faulty. The improperly operating fuel gauge would indicate empty when the fuel tank contained enough fuel for 30 minutes flying time. It has been alleged the gauge was repaired to function correctly without Powers being notified. This is a possible explanation why an experienced pilot such as Powers could have run out of fuel.

== See also ==
- Bill Graham helicopter crash
- Death of Stevie Ray Vaughan
- 2026 Chatsworth helicopter crash
