= Nagano Broadcasting Systems =

JOLH-DTV
- Logo used since 1993

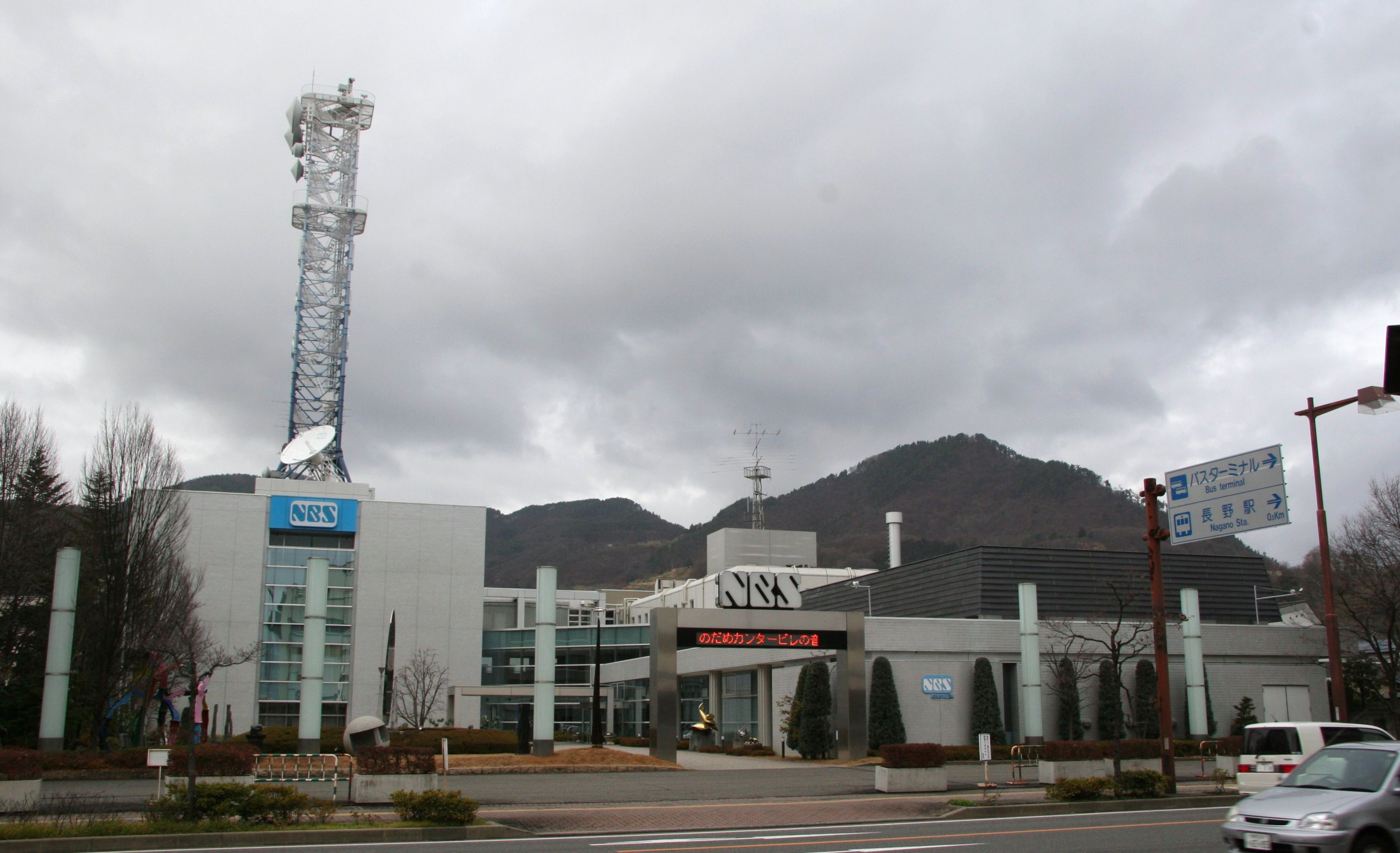
- Headquarters in Nakagosho, Nagano
- Nagano Prefecture; Japan
- City: Nagano City
- Channels: Digital: 15 (UHF); Virtual: 8
- Branding: Nagano Broadcasting; NBS

Programming
- Language: Japanese
- Affiliations: Fuji News Network and Fuji Network System

Ownership
- Owner: Nagano Broadcasting Systems, Inc.

History
- First air date: 1 April 1969
- Former call signs: JOLH-TV (1969–2011)
- Former channel numbers: Analog: 38 (UHF, 1969–2011)

Technical information
- Licensing authority: MIC

Links
- Website: www.nbs-tv.co.jp/

Nagano Broadcasting Systems Inc. (株式会社長野放送, Kabushiki-gaisha Nagano Hoso), also known as NBS, is a Japanese broadcast network affiliated with the Fuji News Network and Fuji Network System. Their headquarters are located in Nagano Prefecture.

== History ==
The first private TV station in Nagano Prefecture was the television division of Shin-etsu Broadcasting, which was launched in October 1958. It was also the first private TV station outside Japan's metropolitan areas. In 1965, the television penetration rate in Nagano Prefecture reached 89.2%, higher than the Japanese average of 82.3%. This also promoted the movement to apply for the establishment of a second private TV station in Nagano Prefecture. From 1962 to 1969, eight companies in Nagano Prefecture applied for television licenses. After the Ministry of Posts and Telecommunications announced its intention to release part of the UHF frequency band for television broadcasting in 1967, the idea of opening a second private TV station in Nagano Prefecture became viable. In September of the same year, the then Governor of Nagano Prefecture, Gonichiro Nishizawa, came forward to ask various companies to consolidate their applications, and received approval. 75% of the capital of the newly established company will be funded by applicants within Nagano Prefecture (Nagano Television and TV Nagano each hold 30%, and Nagano Broadcasting 15%), and 25% will be funded by companies outside Nagano Prefecture (Yomiuri TV Nagano, Nagano Mainichi Broadcasting, Nagano Chuni Broadcasting, Nagano Sankei TV, and Nagano Asahi Broadcasting each contribute 5%). On 21 October 1967, "Nagano Broadcasting Systems, Inc.", which was formed by the integration of various companies, officially submitted an application for television manufacturing and obtained a preliminary license on November 1. On 22 December of the same year, Nagano Broadcasting held a promoters' association. On 18 March 1968, Nagano Broadcasting held a founding association, and the company was officially registered on March 22. On 20 December 1968, Nagano Broadcasting began trial broadcasting. After the completion of the headquarters building, Nagano Broadcasting officially launched on 1 April 1969. The Nagano Broadcasting Headquarters is located in Okada Town, Nagano City, where the former prefectural sericulture test site is located. It is a two-story building with a construction area of approximately 1,988 square meters.

When Nagano Broadcasting started broadcasting, the proportion of prime-time color programs was 65.7%, and the proportion of full-time color programs was 22%. In 1970, some of Nagano Broadcasting's self-produced programs began to be broadcast in color, and became the TV station with the highest proportion of color programs in Nagano Prefecture. In 1974, Nagano Broadcasting participated in the "Japanese Documentary (International Edition)" (ドキュメント日本人 (国際編)) co-produced by members of the Fuji Television Network, which was its first overseas source. In the same year, the documentary "Poetry of Miyama" (みやまの詩) produced by Nagano Broadcasting won the Art Festival Excellence Award, which was the first art festival held by a UHF TV station. Nagano Broadcasting signed a sister station agreement with KSL-TV in the United States in 1975, becoming its first overseas sister station. In 1985, Nagano Broadcasting signed a business exchange and cooperation agreement with Beijing Television in China.

In 1977, Nagano Broadcasting began construction of its headquarters annex, which was completed in August of the following year. The annex is a three-story building with a construction area of 1,269 square meters. Nagano Broadcasting began construction of a new headquarters building in 1983 and was completed the following year. The new headquarters building has four floors (some have five floors), and the construction area has increased to 3,269 square meters. The first to second floors are the main part of news production. The main control room is located on the second floor. Nagano Broadcasting also opened the NBS Hall (NBSホール) in 1985, becoming one of the few local TV stations in Japan to have a concert hall.

- 1 October 2006: Digital terrestrial television was started (Utsukushigahara Main Station, Zenkoji-daira Station, Matsumoto Station, Okaya-Suwa Station, Ina Station and Iida Station).
- 24 July 2011: Analog broadcasts were terminated.
