= 2026 Chatsworth Eurocopter AS350 crash =

Aviation incident in California, United States

- The NTSB crew investigating the wreckage

Accident
- Date: September 15, 2026
- Summary: Under investigation
- Site: Chatsworth, Los Angeles, California, US; 34.23708°N 118.58191°W
- Total fatalities: 3 (Note: Two other people were killed in the bus crash that the helicopter was in the area for.)
- Total injuries: 2 (Note: Six other people were injured in the bus crash the helicopter was in the area for.)

Aircraft
- A Eurocopter AS350 similar to the one involved
- Aircraft type: Eurocopter AS350 B2 Écureuil
- Aircraft name: NewsChopper4
- Operator: Angel City Air (on behalf of KNBC)
- Registration: N358TV
- Occupants: 2
- Passengers: 1
- Crew: 1
- Fatalities: 2
- Survivors: 0

Ground casualties
- Ground fatalities: 1
- Ground injuries: 2

On September 15, 2026, a Eurocopter AS350 Écureuil operated by Angel City Air for television station KNBC/KVEA crashed while covering a fatal bus crash in Chatsworth, California, United States. Two people onboard were killed along with one person on the ground. The cause of the crash is under investigation.

== Background ==
KNBC is the NBC-owned-and-operated television station for Los Angeles County, along with its local Spanish-language sister station, KVEA, operated by NBC-owned Telemundo. The helicopter involved in the crash was operated by Angel City Air.

The helicopter had been covering a bus crash between a 2004 Ford Expedition SUV that had been speeding in the wrong direction, and a Los Angeles Metro bus running on line 166, in which two people were killed and six others were injured. The SUV had plowed into the driver's side of the bus near the midsection at very high speed, far above the speed limit of 40 miles per hour (64 km/h), running a red light in the process. The SUV driver was reported to have been driving under the influence when the crash occurred, and was subsequently arrested and charged with second-degree murder; bail was set at $4 million.

== Crash ==
At around 7 pm PDT, the helicopter reportedly lost contact with KNBC. An audio recording from the helicopter indicated that it had low RPM, although there was fuel onboard when it crashed. The helicopter came down at the 9100 block of North Mason Avenue, in a parking lot near a self-storage facility.

An investigation into the crash was initiated by the National Transportation Safety Board (NTSB). NTSB investigator Fabian Salazar said the broadcast audio contained sounds "consistent with the engine changing its speed"; a preliminary report was expected within 30 days.

== Victims ==
KNBC/KVEA journalist Eliana Moreno, who covered news from NewsChopper4, was a victim of the crash, alongside pilot George Marciniw. Moreno, 38 years old, had been in the air with Angel City Air since 2010 and was engaged to be married. Marciniw, a 70-year-old pilot of more than 30 years with over 14,000 flight hours, had been planning to retire. Edy Gutierrez Mejia, a 29-year-old tourist from Cuilapa, Guatemala, who had arrived in Los Angeles earlier that day, was killed on the ground.

== Aftermath ==
Los Angeles Mayor Karen Bass and Governor of California Gavin Newsom offered condolences to the families of the victims of both the bus and helicopter crashes. The Fallen Journalists Memorial Foundation said Moreno and Marciniw would be added to its planned memorial in Washington, D.C.

== See also ==
- 1977 Encino helicopter crash
- Phoenix news helicopter collision (2007)
