= Thiosymbescaline =

Thiosymbescaline (TSB) may refer to the following:

- 3-Thiosymbescaline (3-TSB)
- 4-Thiosymbescaline (4-TSB)

== See also ==
- Scaline
- Thiomescaline
- Thioescaline
- Thiometaescaline
- Thioasymbescaline
