= Mount Yari =

Mountain in Japan

- 槍ヶ岳
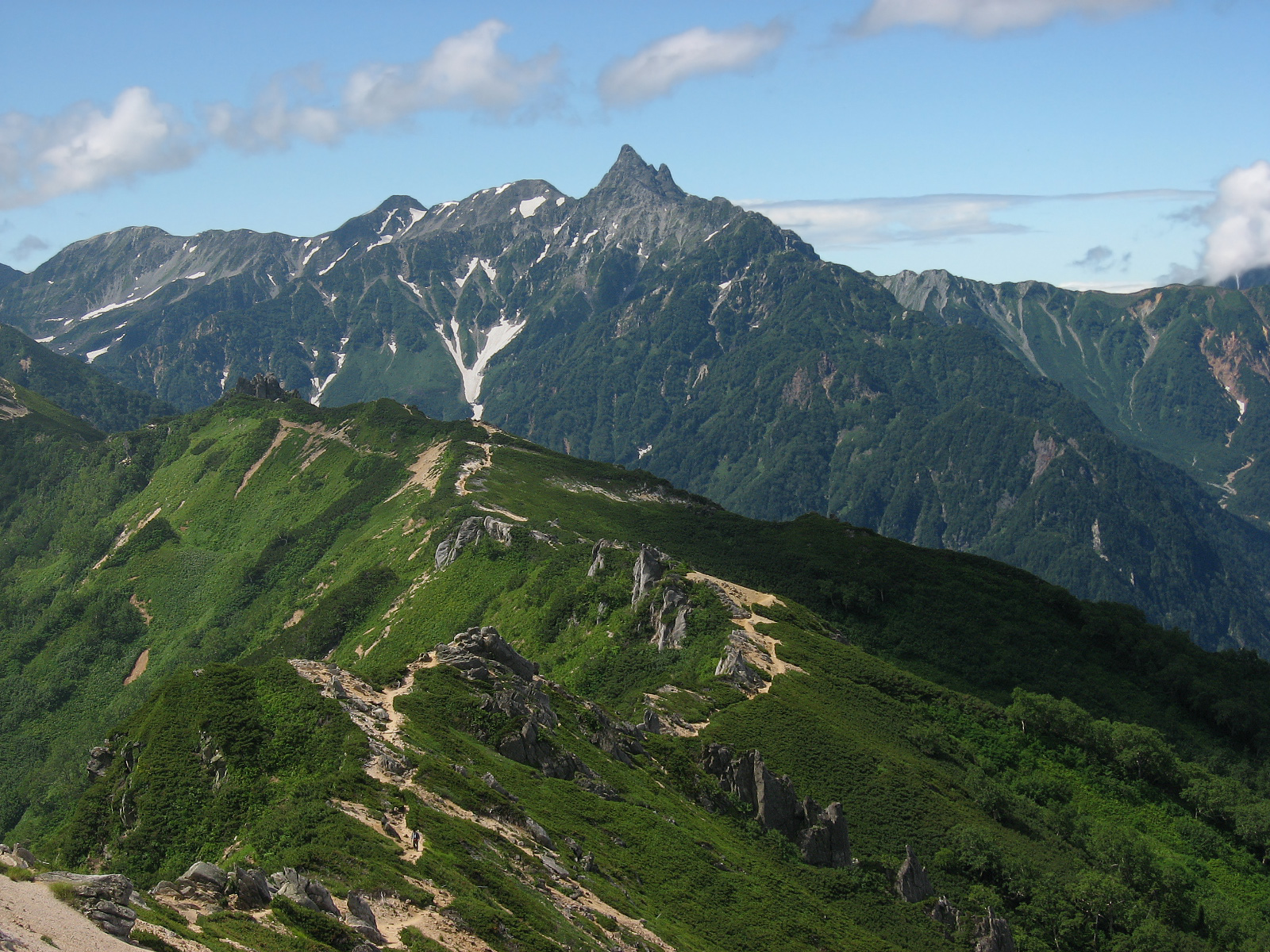
- Mount Yari in the centre of the image (A view from Enzansō).

Highest point
- Elevation: 3,180 m (10,430 ft)
- Listing: Mountains of Japan; 100 Famous Japanese Mountains; Three-thousanders in Japan
- Coordinates: 36°20′31″N 137°38′51″E

Naming
- English translation: spear
- Language of name: Japanese
- Pronunciation: Japanese: [jaɾiɡaꜜtake]

Geography
- Location within Japan
- Location: Chūbu region, Honshū, Japan
- Parent range: Hida Mountains

Climbing
- First ascent: July 28, 1828
- Easiest route: Hike

Mount Yari (槍ヶ岳, Yari-ga-take) is one of the 100 Famous Japanese Mountains. The 3,180-metre-high (10,433 ft) peak lies in the southern part of the Hida Mountains (Northern Alps) of Japan, on the border of Ōmachi and Matsumoto in Nagano Prefecture and Takayama in Gifu Prefecture. The priest Banryū (1786–1840) founded a temple there. The headwater of Japan's longest river, the Shinano River, begins here as the Azusa River.

== History ==
- July 28, 1828 - Banryū first climbed the mountain.
- 1878 - William Gowland became the first non-Japanese man to climb to the top.
- August, 1891 - Englishman Walter Weston climbed to the top.
- 1922 - Japanese mountaineer Maki Yūkō made the first winter ascent of the mountain.
- December 20, 1959 - Senshu University mountain staff is climbing Kitakama (北鎌) Ridge when an avalanche occurs, 9 people were killed.

== Outline ==
Mount Yari is located in the Chūbu-Sangaku National Park. The name derives from its shape, which resembles a spear (槍 yari) thrust into the sky. Because of its shape, it is also called the Matterhorn of Japan. Ridges and valleys reach out from this pyramid-shaped mountain in all directions. The four ridges are Higashikama (東鎌), Yarihotaka (槍穂高), Nishikama (西鎌) and Kitakama (北鎌) to the east, south, west and north, respectively. The four valleys are Yarizawa (槍沢), Hidazawa or Yaridaira (飛騨沢 or 槍平), Senjōzawa (千丈沢) and Tenjōzawa (天丈沢) to the southeast, southwest, northwest and northeast, respectively.

During the hiking season, Mount Yari is popular with mountain climbers. One of the most infamous ridges is Kitakama. It became known through its association with mountaineer Buntarō Katō (加藤 文太郎, Katō Buntarō), who was a model for the novel Kokō no Hito (孤高の人), by Jirō Nitta, and it's manga adaptation of the same name by Shinichi Sakamoto(坂本眞一 , Sakamoto Shinichi). The disaster of Akira Matsunami (松濤明, Matsunami Akira) told in Fūsetsu no Bibāku (風雪のビバーク Snowstorm Bivouac) also contributed to its fame.

Despite the existence of variation routes, climbers stand in line for the famous routes during the summer. In the autumn of 2005, a new mountain trail was constructed going up from Hidarimata Valley (左俣谷 Hidarimata-dani) to Mount Okumaru (奥丸山 Okumaru-yama). This made it possible to reach Yari-ga-take walking from Shinhodaka onsen upstream along the Hidarimata Valley following the mountain ridge of Mount Okumaru.

Two triangulation points were established at the summit. A milepost stone is fixed to the ground. As a reference point for the Geographical Survey Institute of Japan, it is of little importance and even on topographic maps, the summit of Yari-ga-take appears merely as an elevation point.

== Surroundings ==
There are several mountain huts in the vicinity of the mountain: Yari-ga-take Sansō (槍ヶ岳山荘), Sesshō Hut (殺生ヒュッテ), Hut Ōyari (ヒュッテ大槍), Yarisawa Lodge (槍沢ロッジ), Yaridaira-goya (槍平小屋) and Wasabidaira-goya (わさび平小屋). Being situated in the Japanese Alps, several prominent mountains can be reached from Mount Yari, among them: Sugoroku-dake (双六岳), Nishi-dake (西岳), Ōgui-dake (大喰岳), Naka-dake (中岳), Minami-dake (南岳), Okumaru-yama (奥丸山).

== Main ascent routes ==
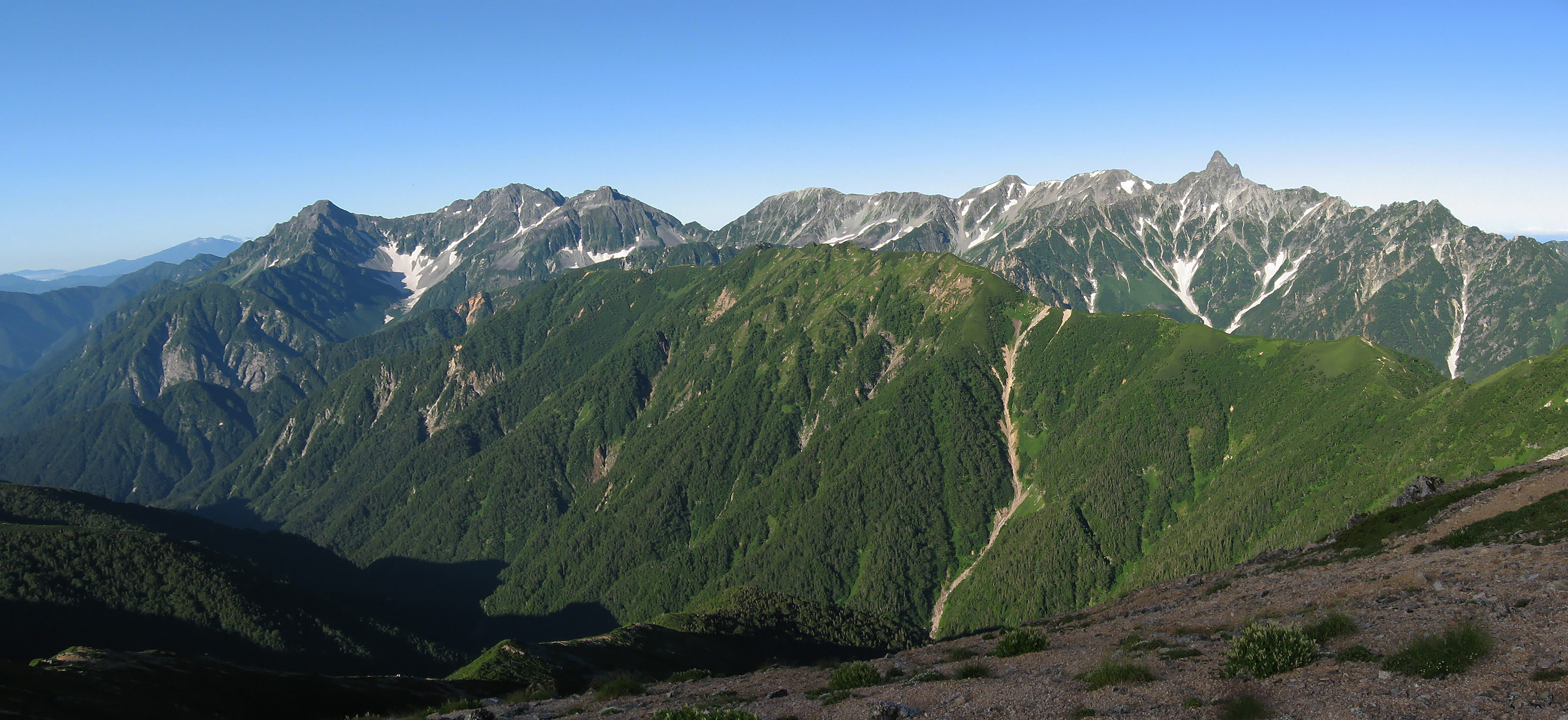
Yari-Hotaka peaks

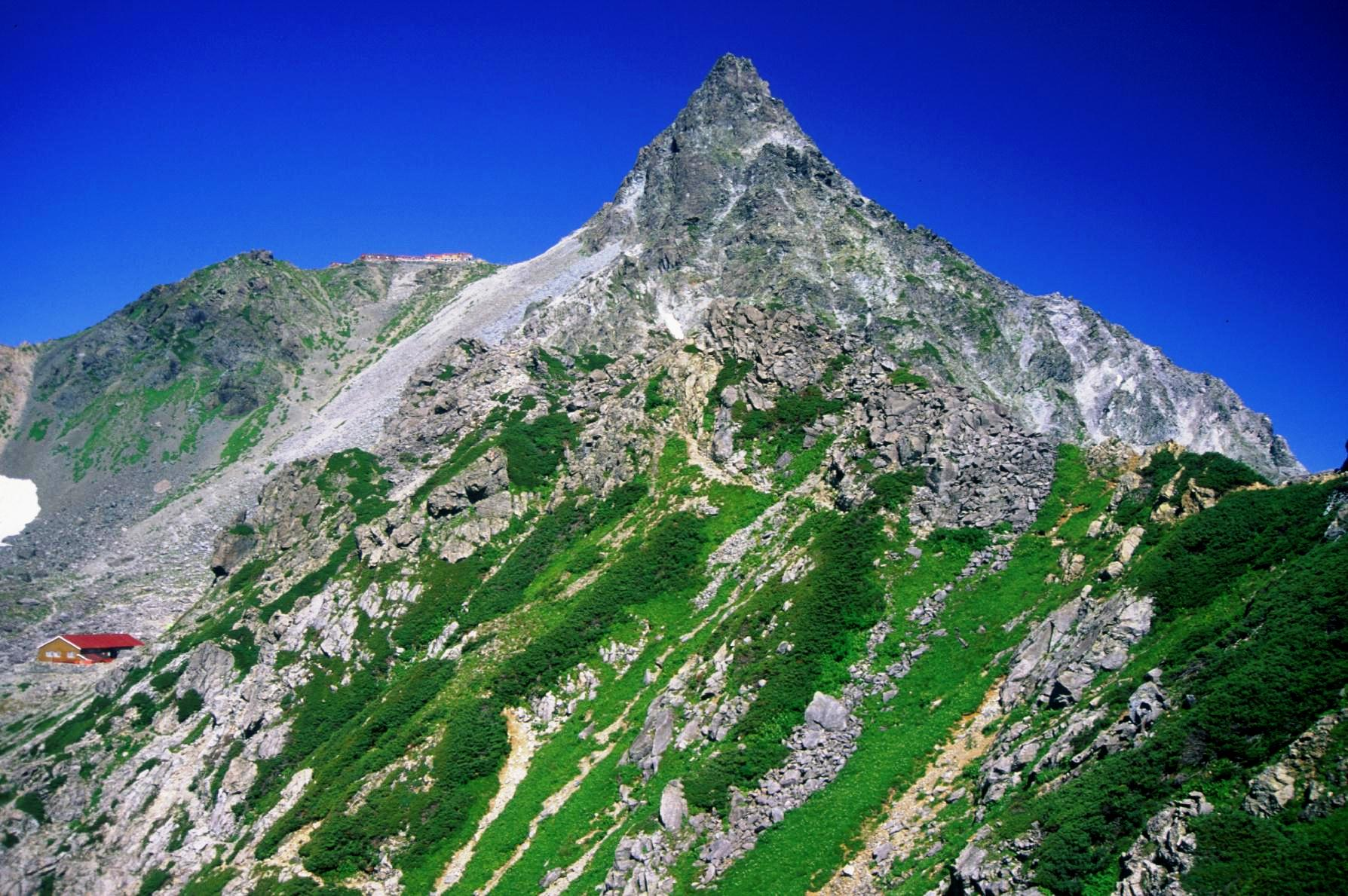
Mount Yari. Photograph taken from Higashikama ridge(eastern ridge), August, 2000.

Higashikama ridge (Omoteginza (表銀座) route)
Nakabusa Onsen (中房温泉) ― Tsubakuro-dake (燕岳) ― Otensho-dake (大天井岳) ― Higashikama ridge ― Yari-ga-take
Nishikama ridge (Uraginza (裏銀座) route)
Takase dam (高瀬ダム) ― Eboshi-dake (烏帽子岳) ― Noguchigorō-dake ― Washiba-dake (鷲羽岳) ― Sugoroku-dake (双六岳) ― もみさわだけ Momizawa-dake (樅沢岳) ― Nishikama ridge ― Yariga-take
Yarisawa (槍沢) route
Kamikōchi (上高地) ― Myōjinike (明神池) ― Tokusawa (徳沢) ― Yokoo (横尾) ― Yarisawa lodge ― Yari-ga-take
Yaridaira route
Shinhodaka Onsen ― Migimatadani (右俣谷) ― Yaridaira ― Yari-ga-take
Wasabidaira (わさび平) route
Shinhodaka Onsen ― Hidarimatadani (左俣谷) ― Wasabidaira ― Okumaru-yama ― Nakazaki ridge (中崎尾根) ― Yari-ga-take
Kitakama ridge (variation route)
Takase dam ― Yumata-onsen-seiransō (湯俣温泉晴嵐荘) ― (千天出合) ― Kitakama ridge ― Yari-ga-take
Yarihotaka traverse (槍穂高縦走) route
Kamikōchi ― Maehotaka-dake (前穂高岳) ― Okuhotaka-dake (奥穂高岳) ― Hotakadake mountain cottage (穂高岳山荘) ― Karasawa-dake (涸沢岳) ― Kitahotaka-dake (北穂高岳) ― Daikiretto (大キレット) ― Minami-dake (南岳) ― Ōbami-dake (Ōbami-dake 大喰岳) ― Yari-ga-take

== See also ==
- Media related to Mount Yari at Wikimedia Commons
- Chūbu-Sangaku National Park
