= TV Shinshu =

JONI-DTV

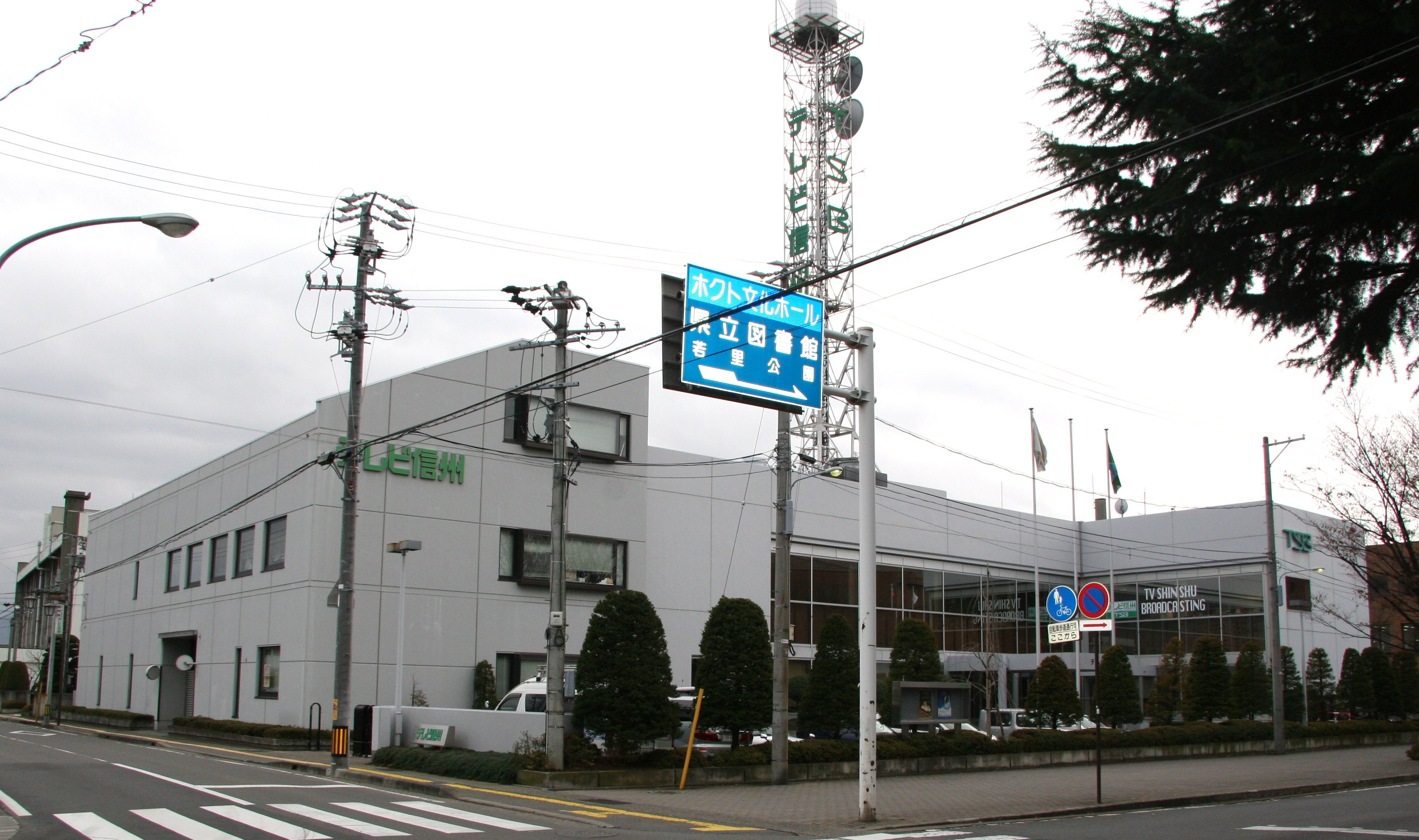
- Headquarters in Wakasato, Nagano
- Nagano Prefecture; Japan
- City: Nagano
- Channels: Digital: 14 (UHF); Virtual: 4
- Branding: TV Shinshu; TSB

Programming
- Language: Japanese
- Affiliations: Nippon News Network and Nippon Television Network System

Ownership
- Owner: TV Shinshu Broadcasting Co., Ltd.

History
- First air date: October 1, 1980
- Former call signs: JONI-TV (1980–2011)
- Former channel numbers: 30 (analog UHF, 1980–2011)
- Former affiliations: All-Nippon News Network (October 1, 1980 - March 31, 1991)
- Call sign meaning: Nagano/ShIn'etsu (prefecture/historical region)

Technical information
- Licensing authority: MIC

Corporate information
- Native name: 株式会社テレビ信州
- Romanized name: Kabushikigaisha Terebishinshū
- Type: Kabushiki gaisha
- Industry: Television broadcasting
- Founded: December 3, 1979
- Headquarters: 1-1-1 Wakasato, Nagano City, Nagano Prefecture, Japan
- Key people: Kazuyuki Fujita (President and CEO)
- Owner: Nippon Television Holdings (19.6%); The Yomiuri Shimbun Holdings (16.6%)
- Number of employees: 87 (2025)
- Footnotes; Data from its Corporate Profile

TV Shinshu Broadcasting Co., Ltd. (Japanese: 株式会社テレビ信州, Hepburn: Kabushiki-gaisha TV Shinshu; TSB), is a Japanese broadcast network affiliated with NNN and NNS. Their headquarters are located in Nagano Prefecture

== History ==
In July 1971, Kiichiro Takizawa applied for the license of the third private TV station in Nagano prefecture under the name of Shinshu TV Broadcasting, which was the first application for the third private broadcaster in Nagano Prefecture. In February 1974, there were 136 companies in Nagano Prefecture that applied to be photographed by the third private television station. In September of the same year, the number increased to 400 companies. Therefore, the Postal Ministry requested the Governor of Nagano Prefecture to mediate and integrate these companies. At that time, these applications could be roughly divided into the Yomiuri Shimbun Department and the Asahi Shimbun Department. There was serious opposition between the two, and there was no progress in mediation. In 1977, the Nagano Prefectural Government established a 10-member committee to intervene in mediation again. Yomiuri and Asahi agreed that 67.5% of the shares of the third private TV station would be held by local companies in Nagano Prefecture, half of which were pro-Yomiuri and pro-Asahi Japanese companies; however, Yomiuri and Asahi agreed that 32.5% would be held by newspapers and television stations. The shares were not compromised. A similar situation occurred in Shizuoka Prefecture at that time. In the end, the Ministry of Post and Telecommunications agreed to open a fourth TV station (i.e., Shizuoka Daiichi Television) within a short period of time, allowing Yomiuri and Asahi to compromise. However, the Postal Ministry refused to implement the same plan in Nagano Prefecture. Although the Nagano Prefectural Government proposed a compromise plan in which Yomiuri accounted for 60% and Asahi accounted for 40%, it was rejected by Asahi and Japan. In the end, the compromise was 50/50 between Yomiuri and Asahi. According to the final plan proposed on November 29, 1978, the equity distribution of the third private TV station will be 64% for the series enterprises (Yomiuri and Asahi enterprises each account for 30.92%, and other enterprises account for 2.16%), 20% for newspapers, 16% for neutral.

At the second founders' meeting held in March 1979, the third private TV station in Nagano Prefecture was officially named Shinano TV (later changed to TV Shinshu because other companies had registered and changed the name). At the same time, the regional rivalry within Nagano Prefecture (Tohoku Shin, headed by Nagano City, versus Chunan Shin, headed by Matsumoto City) is also reflected in the license application. At the firm request of the Matsumoto City financial circle, TV Shinshu was headquartered in Matsumoto, with a broadcasting center in Nagano City. On October 30, 1979, Shinshu TV obtained a preliminary license and officially established on December 3. In February 1980, Shinshu TV purchased land in Marunouchi, Matsumoto City to build its headquarters. The land for the Nagano City Broadcasting Center was chosen at the old Nagano Prefecture Agricultural Experimental Ground. The headquarters is a 4-story building with a total floor area of 1,522 square meters, and the broadcast center is a 2-story building with a total floor area of 2,232 square meters. The main signal transmitting station was built in Mihara, located in central Nagano Prefecture. In September of the same year, the TV Shinshu headquarters and broadcast center were completed. On September 24, TV Shinshu began trial broadcasts.
