= C12H19NO2S =

The molecular formula C_{12}H_{19}NO_{2}S (molar mass: 241.35 g/mol) may refer to:

- 2C-T-2
- 2CT-2-EtO
- 2CT-5-EtO
- Aleph (psychedelic)
- Meta-DOT
- Ortho-DOT
- TME (psychedelics)
  - 3-Thiometaescaline
  - 4-Thiometaescaline
  - 5-Thiometaescaline
- Thioescalines
  - 3-Thioescaline
  - 4-Thioescaline
- TOMSO
