= Methyl-TMA-2 (disambiguation) =

Methyl-TMA-2 is a methylated derivative of TMA-2 that may refer to:

- Methyl-TMA-2 (N-methyl-TMA-2; N-methyl-2,4,5-trimethoxyamphetamine)
- EMM (TMA2-2-EtO; 2-ethoxy-4,5-dimethoxyamphetamine)
- MEM (TMA2-4-EtO; 2,5-dimethoxy-4-ethoxyamphetamine)
- MME (TMA2-5-EtO; 2,4-dimethoxy-5-ethoxyamphetamine)

Other related compounds include:

- EEM (TMA2-2,4-DiEtO; 2,4-diethoxy-5-methoxyamphetamine)
- EME (TMA2-2,5-DiEtO; 2,5-diethoxy-4-methoxyamphetamine)
- MEE (TMA2-4,5-DiEtO; 2-methoxy-4,5-diethoxyamphetamine)
- EEE (TMA2-2,4,5-TriEtO; 2,4,5-triethoxyamphetamine)

== See also ==
- 2,4,5-Trimethoxyamphetamine (TMA-2)
- DOx (psychedelics)
- TWEETIO § DOx compounds
- Methyl-DOM
- Methylmescaline
