= C13H21NO2 =

The molecular formula C_{13}H_{21}NO_{2} (molar mass : 223.31 g/mol, exact mass : 223.157229) may refer to:

- Ariadne (psychedelic)
- Beatrice (psychedelic)
- β-Methyl-DOM
- 2C-P
- 2C-iP
- 2CE-5-EtO
- 2CD-2,5-DiEtO
- 2,5-Dimethoxy-4-ethylamphetamine
- Charmian (drug)
- Florence (drug)
- Ganesha (psychedelic)
- Iris (psychedelic)
- Juno (psychedelic)
- Tigloidine
- Toliprolol
