= 2CB-5-EtO =

Clinical data
- Other names: 2CB-5EtO; 2CB-5-ETO; 2CB-5ETO; 2C-B-5-EtO; 2-Methoxy-5-ethoxy-4-bromophenethylamine; 2-Methoxy-4-bromo-5-ethoxyphenethylamine
- Routes of administration: Oral
- Drug class: Psychoactive drug
- ATC code: None

Pharmacokinetic data
- Duration of action: Unknown

Identifiers
- IUPAC name: 2-(4-bromo-5-ethoxy-2-methoxyphenyl)ethan-1-amine

Chemical and physical data
- Formula: C_{11}H_{16}BrNO_{2}
- Molar mass: 274.158 g·mol^{−1}
- 3D model (JSmol): Interactive image
- SMILES: CCOC1=C(Br)C=C(OC)C(CCN)=C1
- InChI: InChI=1S/C11H16BrNO2/c1-3-15-11-6-8(4-5-13)10(14-2)7-9(11)12/h6-7H,3-5,13H2,1-2H3; Key:OOAVAHXKEKAQFF-UHFFFAOYSA-N

2CB-5-EtO, also known as 2-methoxy-5-ethoxy-4-bromophenethylamine, is a psychoactive drug of the phenethylamine, 2C, and TWEETIO families related to the psychedelic drug 2C-B. It is the derivative of 2C-B in which the methoxy group at the 5 position has been replaced with an ethoxy group.

Unlike other TWEETIOs, 2CB-5-EtO was not described by Alexander Shulgin in his 1991 book PiHKAL (Phenethylamines I Have Known and Loved) or in his 2003 book chapter on psychedelics. In PiHKAL, Shulgin states that only 2CB-2-EtO and 2CB-2,5-DiEtO are known. Similarly, in his 2011 book The Shulgin Index, Volume One: Psychedelic Phenethylamines and Related Compounds, Shulgin states that 2CB-5-EtO is not in the published scientific literature. Correspondingly, the drug is not included in Daniel Trachsel's 2013 book Phenethylamine: von der Struktur zur Funktion. However, in a 1994 literature review on psychedelics, Shulgin states that 2CB-5-EtO is, in fact, known and active, with 2-fold lower potency compared to 2C-B, whereas 2CB-2-EtO has 5-fold lower potency than 2C-B. The properties and effects of 2C-B-5-EtO were not otherwise described and remain unclear.

A derivative of 2CB-5-EtO, ASR-2001 (2CB-5-PrO), in which the 5-ethoxy group has been lengthened to a 5-propoxy group, has been developed by the Alexander Shulgin Research Institute (ASRI) and is being investigated for potential medical use as a non-hallucinogenic mild stimulant-like medication.

2CB-5-EtO was first described in the literature by Shulgin in 1994. It is likely to have been developed and tested by Darrell Lemaire, with publication via personal communication with Shulgin. The drug is a controlled substance in Canada under phenethylamine blanket-ban language.

== See also ==
- TWEETIO (psychedelics)
