= C14H23NO3 =

The molecular formula C_{14}H_{23}NO_{3} (molar mass: 253.34 g/mol) may refer to:

- Arnolol
- 3C-P
- Buscaline
- Isobuscaline
- MIPM
- EEM (psychedelic)
- EME (psychedelic)
- MEE (psychedelic)
- MPM (psychedelic)
- Trisescaline
