= 2CD-2-EtO =

Clinical data
- Other names: 2CD-2EtO; 2CD-2-ETO; 2CD-2ETO; 2C-D-2-EtO; 2-Ethoxy-5-methoxy-4-methylphenethylamine; 2-Ethoxy-4-methyl-5-methoxyphenethylamine
- Routes of administration: Oral
- Drug class: Psychoactive drug
- ATC code: None

Pharmacokinetic data
- Duration of action: ~4 hours

Identifiers
- IUPAC name: 2-(2-ethoxy-5-methoxy-4-methylphenyl)ethan-1-amine

Chemical and physical data
- Formula: C_{12}H_{19}NO_{2}
- Molar mass: 209.289 g·mol^{−1}
- 3D model (JSmol): Interactive image
- SMILES: CCC(C(OCC)=C1)=CC(OC)=C1CCN
- InChI: InChI=1S/C12H19NO2/c1-4-15-12-7-9(2)11(14-3)8-10(12)5-6-13/h7-8H,4-6,13H2,1-3H3; Key:VYXRROQVSSPCGC-UHFFFAOYSA-N

2CD-2-EtO, also known as 2-ethoxy-5-methoxy-4-methylphenethylamine, is a psychoactive drug of the phenethylamine, 2C, and TWEETIO families related to the psychedelic drug 2C-D. It is the derivative of 2C-D in which the methoxy group at the 2 position has been replaced with an ethoxy group.

According to Alexander Shulgin in his book PiHKAL (Phenethylamines I Have Known and Loved) and other publications, 2CD-2-EtO's dose is 60 mg orally and its duration is about 4 hours. The effects of 2CD-2-EtO have been reported to include feelings of closeness and intimacy between couples without an appreciable state of intoxication.

The chemical synthesis of 2CD-2-EtO has been described.

2CD-2-EtO was first described in the literature by Shulgin in PiHKAL in 1991. It was developed and tested by Darrell Lemaire, with publication via personal communication with Shulgin. The drug is a controlled substance in Canada under phenethylamine blanket-ban language.

== See also ==
- TWEETIO (psychedelics)
- Florence (DOM-2ETO)
