= 2CB-2-EtO =

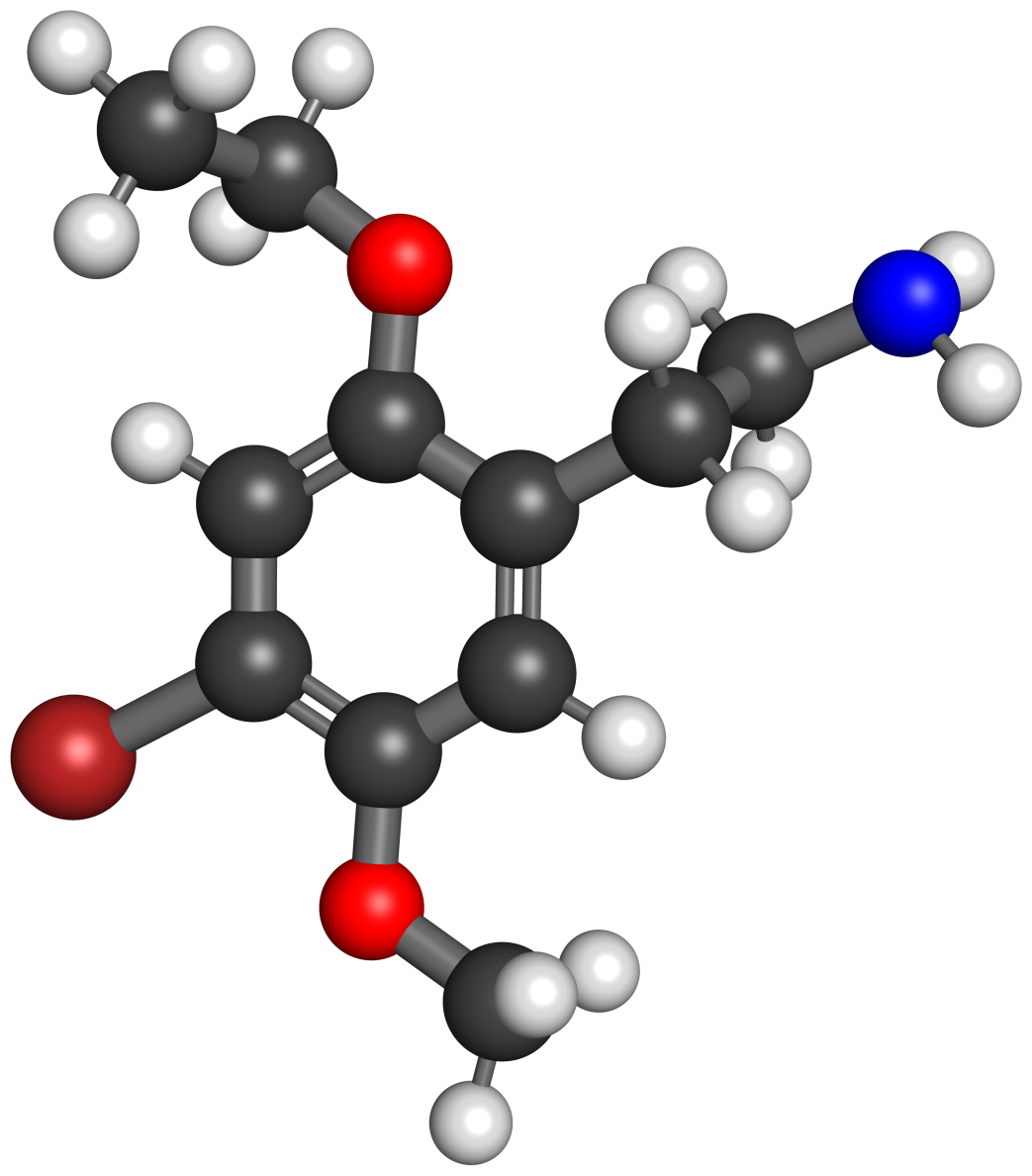

Clinical data
- Other names: 2C-B-2-ETO; 4-Bromo-5-ethoxy-2-methoxyphenethylamine; 2-Methoxy-4-bromo-5-ethoxyphenethylamine
- Routes of administration: Oral
- Drug class: Serotonergic psychedelic; Hallucinogen
- ATC code: None

Pharmacokinetic data
- Duration of action: 3–6 hours

Identifiers
- IUPAC name: 2-(4-bromo-2-ethoxy-5-methoxyphenyl)ethanamine
- PubChem CID: 86200098
- ChemSpider: 62909262

Chemical and physical data
- Formula: C_{11}H_{16}BrNO_{2}
- Molar mass: 274.158 g·mol^{−1}
- 3D model (JSmol): Interactive image
- SMILES: CCOC1=CC(=C(C=C1CCN)OC)Br
- InChI: InChI=1S/C11H16BrNO2/c1-3-15-10-7-9(12)11(14-2)6-8(10)4-5-13/h6-7H,3-5,13H2,1-2H3; Key:FLMAKYQLBBLIAH-UHFFFAOYSA-N

2CB-2-EtO, also known as 4-bromo-2-methoxy-5-ethoxyphenethylamine, is a psychedelic drug of the phenethylamine, 2C, and TWEETIO families related to 2C-B. It is the derivative of 2C-B in which the methoxy group at the 2 position has been replaced with an ethoxy group.

According to Alexander Shulgin in his book PiHKAL (Phenethylamines I Have Known and Loved) and other publications, 2CB-2-EtO produces maximal effects at a dose of about 15 mg orally. Higher doses of 30 to 50 mg orally did not increase its effects any further but only prolonged their duration, from about 3 hours to perhaps 6 hours. 2CB-2-EtO was said to have not had an intensity that resembled that of 2C-B at any dose. It was also said to be dramatically or about 5-fold less potent than 2C-B. Beyond the preceding, the specific effects of 2CB-2-EtO were not described.

The chemical synthesis of 2CB-2-EtO has been described.

2CB-2-EtO was first described in the literature by Shulgin in PiHKAL in 1991. It was developed and tested by Darrell Lemaire, with publication via personal communication with Shulgin. The drug is a controlled substance in Canada under phenethylamine blanket-ban language.

== See also ==
- TWEETIO (psychedelics)
- 2CD-5EtO
- 2CB-5PrO (ASR-2001)
