= 2CT2-5-EtO =

Clinical data
- Other names: 2CT2-5EtO; 2CT2-5-ETO; 2CT2-5ETO; 2-Methoxy-4-ethylthio-5-ethoxyphenethylamine; 4-Ethylthio-2-methoxy-5-ethoxyphenethylamine; Forever Yours
- Routes of administration: Oral
- Drug class: Psychoactive drug
- ATC code: None

Pharmacokinetic data
- Onset of action: "Slow" or "gentle"; 3–4 hours (peak)
- Duration of action: 16–24 hours

Identifiers
- IUPAC name: 2-[5-ethoxy-4-(ethylsulfanyl)-2-methoxyphenyl]ethan-1-amine

Chemical and physical data
- Formula: C_{13}H_{21}NO_{2}S
- Molar mass: 255.38 g·mol^{−1}
- 3D model (JSmol): Interactive image
- SMILES: CCSC(C(OCC)=C1)=CC(OC)=C1CCN
- InChI: InChI=1S/C13H21NO2S/c1-4-16-12-8-10(6-7-14)11(15-3)9-13(12)17-5-2/h8-9H,4-7,14H2,1-3H3; Key:KIJHHVNZZUGBIX-UHFFFAOYSA-N

2CT2-5-EtO, also known as 4-ethylthio-2-methoxy-5-ethoxyphenethylamine or as Forever Yours, is a psychoactive drug of the phenethylamine, 2C, and TWEETIO families related to the psychedelic drug 2C-T-2. It is the derivative of 2C-T-2 in which the methoxy group at the 5 position has been replaced with an ethoxy group.

According to Alexander Shulgin in his book PiHKAL (Phenethylamines I Have Known and Loved) and other publications, 2CT2-5-EtO's dose is 20 mg orally and its duration is 16 to 24 hours. Its onset is said to be "slow" and "gentle", with peak effects occurring after 3 or 4 hours, and it is said to be very long-lived. The effects of 2CT2-5-EtO have been reported to include flooding of thoughts, easy conversation, insights, and feeling drained in the following day or two. Occasionally, a sedative was given to counteract its effects at the 16-hour point and allow for sleep, but with some intoxication still present the next day. The drug's potency is similar to that of 2C-T-2, but it is much longer-lasting. Due to its long duration, 2CT2-5-EtO was given the nickname "Forever Yours".

The chemical synthesis of 2CT2-5-EtO has been described.

2CT2-5-EtO was first described in the literature by Shulgin in PiHKAL in 1991. It was developed and tested by Darrell Lemaire, with publication via personal communication with Shulgin. The drug is a controlled substance in Canada under phenethylamine blanket-ban language.

== See also ==
- TWEETIO (psychedelics)
