= 2CT2-2-EtO =

Clinical data
- Other names: 2CT2-2EtO; 2-Ethoxy-4-ethylthio-5-methoxyphenethylamine
- Routes of administration: Oral, intranasal
- Drug class: Serotonergic psychedelic; Hallucinogen
- ATC code: None

Pharmacokinetic data
- Onset of action: "Very quick"
- Duration of action: 5–9 hours

Identifiers
- IUPAC name: 2-(2-ethoxy-4-ethylsulfanyl-5-methoxyphenyl)ethanamine
- PubChem CID: 57498520

Chemical and physical data
- Formula: C_{13}H_{21}NO_{2}S
- Molar mass: 255.38 g·mol^{−1}
- 3D model (JSmol): Interactive image
- SMILES: CCOC1=CC(=C(C=C1CCN)OC)SCC
- InChI: InChI=1S/C13H21NO2S/c1-4-16-11-9-13(17-5-2)12(15-3)8-10(11)6-7-14/h8-9H,4-7,14H2,1-3H3; Key:KVHWZNAVMLBLMV-UHFFFAOYSA-N

2CT2-2-EtO, also known as 2-ethoxy-4-ethylthio-5-methoxyphenethylamine, is a psychedelic drug of the phenethylamine, 2C, and TWEETIO families related to 2C-T-2. It is the derivative of 2C-T-2 in which the methoxy group at the 2 position has been replaced with an ethoxy group.

According to Alexander Shulgin in his book PiHKAL (Phenethylamines I Have Known and Loved) and other publications, 2CT2-2-EtO has a "completely effective" dose of 50 mg orally, a typical dose of 10 mg intranasally but with considerable variation between individuals, and a duration of 5 to 6 hours or of 9 hours. Its onset is said to be "very quick". The effects of 2CT2-2-EtO have been reported to include blurred vision, intense closed-eye visuals, generation of a pleasant and contemplative mood, restless sleep, and weird dreams. Due to the large ~5-fold increase in potency when taken intranasally instead of orally, 2CT2-2-EtO may undergo substantial first-pass metabolism with oral administration.

The chemical synthesis of 2CT2-2-EtO has been described.

2CT2-2-EtO was first described in the literature by Shulgin in PiHKAL in 1991. It was developed and tested by Darrell Lemaire, with publication via personal communication with Shulgin. The drug is a controlled substance in Canada under phenethylamine blanket-ban language.

== See also ==
- TWEETIO (psychedelics)
