= 2CT2-2,5-DiEtO =

Clinical data
- Other names: 2CT2-DiEtO; 2CT2-Di-EtO; 2CT2-DIETO; 2CT2-DI-ETO; 2,5-Diethoxy-4-ethylthiophenethylamine; 4-Ethylthio-2,5-diethoxyphenethylamine
- Routes of administration: Oral
- Drug class: Psychoactive drug
- ATC code: None

Pharmacokinetic data
- Duration of action: ~9 hours

Identifiers
- IUPAC name: 2-[2,5-diethoxy-4-(ethylsulfanyl)phenyl]ethan-1-amine
- PubChem CID: 172277034

Chemical and physical data
- Formula: C_{14}H_{23}NO_{2}S
- Molar mass: 269.40 g·mol^{−1}
- 3D model (JSmol): Interactive image
- SMILES: CCOC1=CC(SCC)=C(OCC)C=C1CCN
- InChI: InChI=1S/C14H23NO2S/c1-4-16-12-10-14(18-6-3)13(17-5-2)9-11(12)7-8-15/h9-10H,4-8,15H2,1-3H3; Key:HDKGMXYAXURMGE-UHFFFAOYSA-N

2CT2-2,5-DiEtO, also known as 2,5-diethoxy-4-ethylthiophenethylamine, is a psychoactive drug of the phenethylamine, 2C, and TWEETIO families related to the psychedelic drug 2C-T-2. It is the derivative of 2C-T-2 in which the methoxy groups at the 2 and 5 positions have been replaced with ethoxy groups.

According to Alexander Shulgin in his book PiHKAL (Phenethylamines I Have Known and Loved) and other publications, 2CT2-2,5-DiEtO's dose is 10 to 50 mg orally and its duration is approximately 9 hours. The effects of 2CT2-2,5-DiEtO have been reported to include initial nervousness and edginess followed by energy and high attentiveness, few if any sensory alterations, and no next-day hangover. Higher doses across the range of 10 to 50 mg orally were not particularly different in terms of intensity, but were progressively longer in duration. At 50 mg orally, the duration was around 9 hours.

The chemical synthesis of 2CT2-2,5-DiEtO has been described.

2CT2-2,5-DiEtO was first described in the literature by Shulgin in PiHKAL in 1991. It was developed and tested by Darrell Lemaire, with publication via personal communication with Shulgin. The drug is a controlled substance in Canada under phenethylamine blanket-ban language.

== See also ==
- TWEETIO (psychedelics)
