= MME (drug) =

Clinical data
- Other names: 2,4-Dimethoxy-5-ethoxyamphetamine; TMA2-5-EtO
- Routes of administration: Oral
- Drug class: Psychoactive drug
- ATC code: None

Pharmacokinetic data
- Duration of action: "Probably 6–10 hours"

Identifiers
- IUPAC name: 1-(5-ethoxy-2,4-dimethoxyphenyl)propan-2-amine
- CAS Number: 23693-32-5
- PubChem CID: 44719602
- ChemSpider: 21106338
- UNII: 9KL74SEV4U
- ChEMBL: ChEMBL3244455
- CompTox Dashboard (EPA): DTXSID90660374

Chemical and physical data
- Formula: C_{13}H_{21}NO_{3}
- Molar mass: 239.315 g·mol^{−1}
- 3D model (JSmol): Interactive image
- SMILES: COc1cc(OC)c(cc1OCC)CC(C)N
- InChI: InChI=1S/C13H21NO3/c1-5-17-13-7-10(6-9(2)14)11(15-3)8-12(13)16-4/h7-9H,5-6,14H2,1-4H3; Key:NAMNXRTWJMASNT-UHFFFAOYSA-N

MME, also known as 2,4-dimethoxy-5-ethoxyamphetamine or as TMA2-5-EtO, is a psychoactive drug of the phenethylamine, amphetamine, and DOx families related to TMA-2. It is the analogue of TMA-2 in which the methoxy group at the 5 position has been replaced with an ethoxy group.

== Use and effects ==
In his book PiHKAL (Phenethylamines I Have Known and Loved), Alexander Shulgin lists MME's dose as 40 mg and above orally and its duration as probably 6 to 10 hours. MME received a "plus-two" rating on the Shulgin Rating Scale. However, its specific effects were not described, aside from diarrhea and beyond statements like it having "a possibly interesting collection of effects" and it being "very encouraging". Moreover, Shulgin stated that it was less active than MEM, another related TMA-2 analogue. Shulgin expressed interest in further evaluating higher doses of MME.

== Pharmacology ==
=== Pharmacodynamics ===
Alexander Shulgin describes in PiHKAL an experiment with MME, in which he administered varying amounts of the drug to mice via injections. Shulgin reports that 7 of the 9 mice injected with MME died as a result. After describing his experiment, Shulgin speculates that MME may have an LD_{50} value of around 60–80 mg/Kg in mice when injected. Shulgin describes that one of the mice began convulsing after being administered MME: "[...] the mouse went into a twitching series of convulsions (known as clonic in the trade) and in five minutes he was dead."

== Chemistry ==
=== Synthesis ===
Shulgin describes the synthesis of MME in his book PiHKAL. He starts with 4-ethoxy-3-methoxybenzaldehyde. Shulgin labels the 4-ethoxy-3-methoxybenzaldehyde as ethylvanillin, although ethylvanillin is in fact 3-ethoxy-4-hydroxybenzaldehyde. Ethylvanillin can be methylate to 4-ethoxy-3-methoxybenzladehyde. The 4-ethoxy-3-methoxybenzaldehyde is then subjected to a Baeyer–Villiger oxidation with peracetic acid and acetic acid to yield 4-ethoxy-3-methoxyphenol. The 4-ethoxy-3-methoxyphenol is methylated to yield 2,4-dimethoxy-1-ethoxybenzene. The 2,4-dimethoxy-1-ethoxybenzene is subjected to Reimer-Tiemann formylated to 2,4-dimethoxy-5-ethoxybenzaldehyde. The 2,4-dimethoxy-5-ethoxybenzaldehyde by subjecting it to a Knoevenagel condensation with acetic acid, ammonium acetate and nitroethane, and reducing the resulting 1-(2,4-dimethoxy-5-ethoxyphenyl)-2-nitropropene to MME with lithium aluminium hydride under an inert atmosphere.

=== Analogues ===
MME has several isomers. MEM is one of them along with EMM. According to Alexander Shulgin, EEM is not active. MEM is active in humans and also possesses activity at the serotonin 5-HT_{2A} receptor. Other analogues of MME include Iris (DOM-5-EtO) and metaescaline.

== History ==
MME was first described in the scientific literature by Alexander Shulgin in 1968. Subsequently, it was described in greater detail by Shulgin in his book PiHKAL (Phenethylamines I Have Known and Loved) in 1991.

== See also ==
- DOx (psychedelics)
- TWEETIO § DOx compounds
- EMM and MEM
