= ASR-2001 =

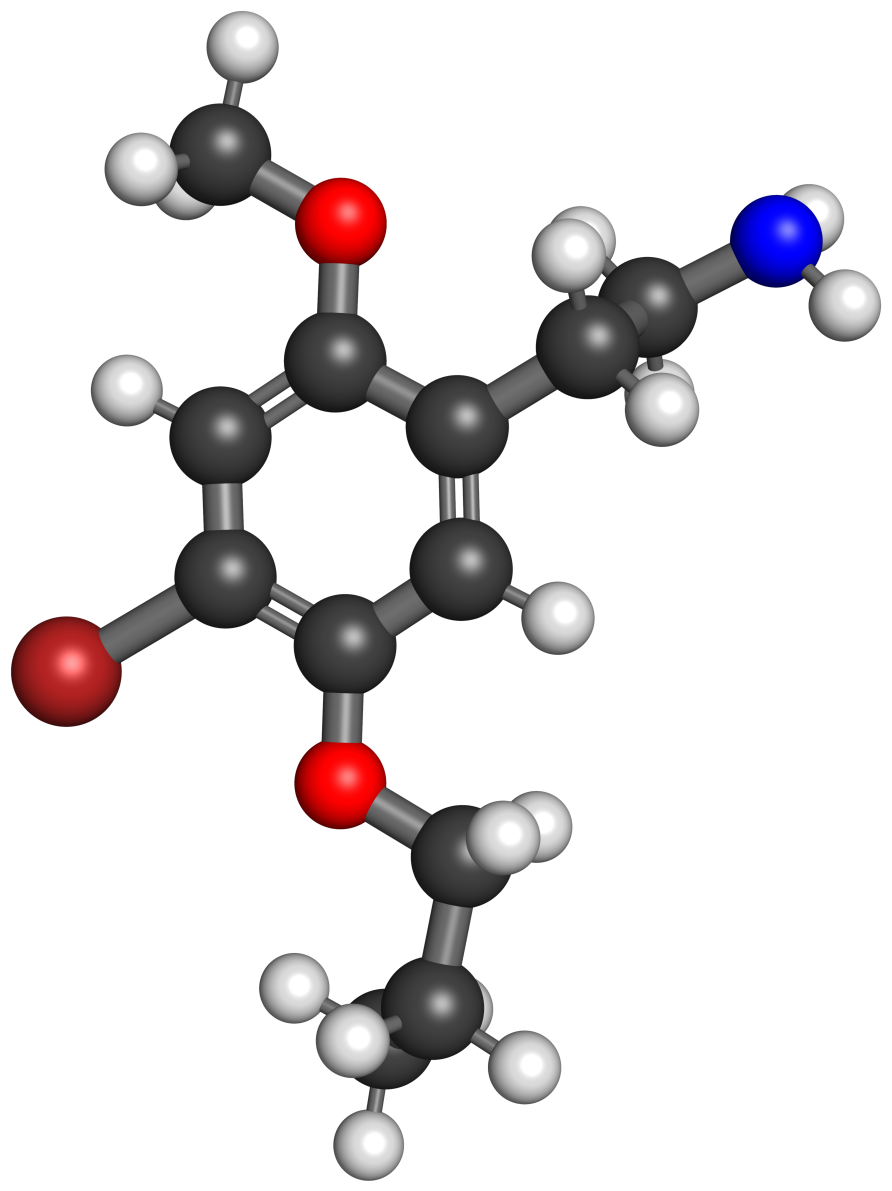

Clinical data
- Other names: ASR2001; 2CB-5PrO; 2CB-5-PrO; 5-PrO-2C-B; 4-Bromo-2-methoxy-5-propoxyphenethylamine
- Routes of administration: Oral
- Drug class: Non-hallucinogenic serotonin 5-HT_{2A} receptor and 5-HT_{1B} receptor agonist
- ATC code: None

Pharmacokinetic data
- Onset of action: 1–1.5 hours
- Duration of action: 8–10 hours

Identifiers
- IUPAC name: 2-(4-bromo-2-methoxy-5-propoxyphenyl)ethanamine
- CAS Number: 3064322-05-7
- PubChem CID: 172608920

Chemical and physical data
- Formula: C_{12}H_{18}BrNO_{2}
- Molar mass: 288.185 g·mol^{−1}
- 3D model (JSmol): Interactive image
- SMILES: CCCOC1=C(C=C(C(=C1)CCN)OC)Br
- InChI: InChI=1S/C12H18BrNO2/c1-3-6-16-12-7-9(4-5-14)11(15-2)8-10(12)13/h7-8H,3-6,14H2,1-2H3; Key:SMMQLGYZANIEMB-UHFFFAOYSA-N

ASR-2001, also known as 2CB-5PrO or as 4-bromo-2-methoxy-5-propoxyphenethylamine, is a non-hallucinogenic serotonin receptor agonist of the phenethylamine, 2C, and TWEETIO families which is under development for the treatment of psychiatric disorders. It is the TWEETIO analogue of 2C-B in which the 5-methoxy group is replaced with a 5-propoxy group. The drug is taken orally.

== Use and effects ==
According to its developers, ASR-2001 has no overt psychedelic effects, but instead produces a "focusing-type" "state of mental clarity" without the frank psychostimulant effects of drugs like amphetamine and methylphenidate. It is said to affect mood, concentration, and focus, to not disturb but to potentially facilitate detailed work, and to capture the effects that are being sought with psychedelic microdosing but with less risk. As an example of its better safety profile, there is a ceiling effect with ASR-2001 such that pushing the dose will not result in an accidental psychedelic experience. In addition, the drug has strong selectivity over the toxic serotonin 5-HT_{2B} receptor, in contrast to psychedelics like LSD and psilocybin. ASR-2001 is said to have a dose range of 10 to 40 mg, an onset of 1 to 1.5 hours, and a duration of 8 to 10 hours. Its psychoactive effects are described as "subtle".

== Pharmacology ==
=== Pharmacodynamics ===
ASR-2001 is a non-hallucinogenic serotonin 5-HT_{2A} receptor agonist and is orally active, highly potent, and has high selectivity over the serotonin 5-HT_{2B} receptor (94-fold in terms of activational potency). It is also a highly potent agonist of the serotonin 5-HT_{1B} receptor, whereas its activity at the serotonin serotonin 5-HT_{1A} receptor was very weak and its activity at the serotonin 5-HT_{2C} receptor was not described. ASR-2001 showed no significant activity at a variety of other sites, including other serotonin receptors and the monoamine transporters. The drug is said to have low efficacy in terms of serotonin 5-HT_{2A} receptor activation, and this is said to be responsible for its lack of hallucinogenic effects.

== Chemistry ==
=== Synthesis ===
The chemical synthesis of ASR-2001 has been described.

=== Analogues ===
Analogues of ASR-2001 include other 2Cs like 2C-B and 2C-D, other TWEETIOs like 2CB-2EtO, 2CB-5EtO, and 2CB-2,5-DiEtO, DOx compounds like DOB, DOM, DOET, and DOPR, and 4Cs like 4C-B and Ariadne (4C-D).

== History ==
ASR-2001 was first described in 2023. It was described by Nicholas Cozzi of the Alexander Shulgin Research Institute (ASRI) at the Psychedelic Science conference in June 2023. The drug was patented by Mark Martini, Nicholas Cozzi, Paul Daley, and Thomas Szabo in association with ASRI in 2024.

== Society and culture ==
=== Legal status ===
==== Canada ====
ASR-2001 is a controlled substance in Canada under phenethylamine blanket-ban language.

==== United States ====
ASR-2001 is not an explicitly controlled substance in the United States. However, it could be considered a controlled substance under the Federal Analogue Act if intended for human consumption.

== Research ==
ASR-2001 is under development by Nicholas V. Cozzi and Paul F. Daley and colleagues at the Alexander Shulgin Research Institute (ASRI). As of early 2025, it is in the preclinical research stage of development. Potential applications of ASR-2001 are said to include treatment of attention-deficit hyperactivity disorder (ADHD) and self-betterment in healthy individuals, depending on what regulatory agencies may allow.

== See also ==
- TWEETIO (psychedelics)
- List of investigational hallucinogens and entactogens
- Non-hallucinogenic 5-HT_{2A} receptor agonist
- Stimulant § Serotonin 5-HT_{2A} receptor agonists
- Motivation-enhancing drug § Serotonin 5-HT_{2A} receptor agonists
- ASR-3001 (5-MeO-iPALT)
- AB-300
- Thiobuscaline
