= C12H19NO2 =

The molecular formula C_{12}H_{19}NO_{2} (molar mass: 209.28 g/mol, exact mass: 209.141579) may refer to:

- Bamethan
- 2CD-5EtO
- 2CD-2EtO
- 2C-E
- 2C-G
- Crisugabalin
- Dimethoxymethamphetamine
- 2,5-Dimethoxy-4-methylamphetamine
- Methyl-DMA
- Mirogabalin
- Octyl cyanoacrylate
- 2-Octyl cyanoacrylate
- Psi-DOM
