= 2CE-5iPrO =

Chemical compound

Clinical data
- Other names: 2CE-5-iPrO; 5-iPrO-2C-E; 2-Methoxy-5-isopropoxy-4-ethylphenethylamine; 2-Methoxy-4-ethyl-5-isopropoxyphenethylamine
- Drug class: Serotonin receptor modulator

Identifiers
- IUPAC name: 1-(5-(propan-2-yloxy)-2-methoxy-4-ethylphenyl)-ethan-1-amine
- CAS Number: 2570936-85-3
- PubChem CID: 172866806
- UNII: 3LZ3SW2UGQ

Chemical and physical data
- Formula: C_{14}H_{23}NO_{2}
- Molar mass: 237.343 g·mol^{−1}
- 3D model (JSmol): Interactive image
- SMILES: COc1cc(CC)c(cc1CCN)OC(C)C
- InChI: InChI=1S/C14H23NO2/c1-5-11-8-13(16-4)12(6-7-15)9-14(11)17-10(2)3/h8-10H,5-7,15H2,1-4H3; Key:WBECSSJDHFYNMA-UHFFFAOYSA-N

2CE-5iPrO, also known as 5-iPrO-2C-E or as 2-methoxy-5-isopropoxy-4-ethylphenethylamine, is a psychedelic substituted phenethylamine derivative related to 2C-E, but with the 5-methoxy group extended to isopropoxy. Similar to related "tweetio" compounds such as 2CD-5EtO, it has a longer duration of action than 2C-E but is otherwise similar in activity, although it shows reduced anti-inflammatory actions. The drug is a controlled substance in Canada under phenethylamine blanket-ban language.

== See also ==
- TWEETIO (psychedelics)
- ASR-2001 (2CB-5PrO)
- 2C-E-FLY
