= C14H23NO2S =

The molecular formula C_{14}H_{23}NO_{2}S (molar mass: 269.40 g/mol) may refer to:

- 2C-T-9
- 2C-T-17
- 2C-T-19, or 2,5-dimethoxy-4-butylthiophenethylamine
- 2C-T-25
- 2CT7-2-EtO
- 2CT4-2-EtO
- 4C-T-2
- Thiobuscaline
- Thiotrisescaline
