= 2CE-5-EtO =

Clinical data
- Other names: 2CE-5EtO; 2CE-5-ETO; 2CE-5ETO; 2-Methoxy-4-ethyl-5-ethoxyphenethylamine; 4-Ethyl-2-methoxy-5-ethoxyphenethylamine; Eternity
- Routes of administration: Oral
- Drug class: Psychoactive drug
- ATC code: None

Pharmacokinetic data
- Onset of action: 3–4 hours (plateau)
- Duration of action: 16–24 hours

Identifiers
- IUPAC name: 2-(5-ethoxy-4-ethyl-2-methoxyphenyl)ethan-1-amine

Chemical and physical data
- Formula: C_{13}H_{21}NO_{2}
- Molar mass: 223.316 g·mol^{−1}
- 3D model (JSmol): Interactive image
- SMILES: CCC(C(OCC)=C1)=CC(OC)=C1CCN
- InChI: InChI=1S/C13H21NO2/c1-4-10-8-12(15-3)11(6-7-14)9-13(10)16-5-2/h8-9H,4-7,14H2,1-3H3; Key:DDGVPHDBSPJOPN-UHFFFAOYSA-N

2CE-5-EtO, also known as 4-ethyl-2-methoxy-5-ethoxyphenethylamine or as Eternity, is a psychoactive drug of the phenethylamine, 2C, and TWEETIO families related to the psychedelic drug 2C-E. It is the derivative of 2C-E in which the methoxy group at the 5 position has been replaced with an ethoxy group.

According to Alexander Shulgin in his book PiHKAL (Phenethylamines I Have Known and Loved) and other publications, 2CE-5-EtO's dose is 10 to 15 mg orally and its duration is 16 to 24 hours. It has a slow onset of 3 to 4 hours to reach a plateau of effects and is described as extremely long-lived, with a duration 2 to 3 times longer than that of 2C-E. The drug is said to be gentle and forgiving, but its effects were not otherwise described. Due to its very long duration, it has sometimes been counteracted with a benzodiazepine like diazepam or triazolam at the 16-hour point to allow sleep, but with effects still evident the next day. One subject gave it the nickname "Eternity".

The chemical synthesis of 2CE-5-EtO has been described.

2CE-5-EtO was first described in the literature by Shulgin in PiHKAL in 1991. It was developed and tested by Darrell Lemaire, with publication via personal communication with Shulgin. The drug is a controlled substance in Canada under phenethylamine blanket-ban language.

== See also ==
- TWEETIO (psychedelics)
