= C14H23NO2 =

The molecular formula C_{14}H_{23}NO_{2} (molar mass: 237.343 g/mol) may refer to:

- 2C-Bu
- 2CE-5iPrO
- 2C-iBu
- 2C-tBu
- 2,5-Dimethoxy-4-isopropylamphetamine
- 2,5-Dimethoxy-4-propylamphetamine
- 5C-D
- DOTMA
- DOM-2,5-DiEtO
- Dipropyldopamine
- N-Methyl-DOET
