= 2CT4-2-EtO =

Clinical data
- Other names: 2CT4-2EtO; 2CT4-2-ETO; 2CT-4-2-ETO; 2C-T-4-2-EtO; 2-Ethoxy-5-methoxy-4-isopropylthiophenethylamine; 2-Ethoxy-4-isopropylthio-5-methoxyphenethylamine; Tenderness
- Routes of administration: Oral
- Drug class: Psychoactive drug
- ATC code: None

Pharmacokinetic data
- Duration of action: ~10 hours

Identifiers
- IUPAC name: 2-[2-ethoxy-5-methoxy-4-(propan-2-ylsulfanyl)phenyl]ethan-1-amine

Chemical and physical data
- Formula: C_{14}H_{23}NO_{2}S
- Molar mass: 269.40 g·mol^{−1}
- 3D model (JSmol): Interactive image
- SMILES: CCOC1=CC(SC(C)C)=C(OC)C=C1CCN
- InChI: InChI=1S/C14H23NO2S/c1-5-17-12-9-14(18-10(2)3)13(16-4)8-11(12)6-7-15/h8-10H,5-7,15H2,1-4H3; Key:BASFTYSLRQAKTB-UHFFFAOYSA-N

2CT4-2-EtO, also known as 2-ethoxy-5-methoxy-4-isopropylthiophenethylamine or as Tenderness, is a psychoactive drug of the phenethylamine, 2C, and TWEETIO families related to the psychedelic drug 2C-T-4. It is the derivative of 2C-T-4 in which the methoxy group at the 2 position has been replaced with an ethoxy group.

According to Alexander Shulgin in his book PiHKAL (Phenethylamines I Have Known and Loved) and other publications, 2CT4-2-EtO's dose is 10 to 25 mg orally and its duration is approximately 10 hours. Doses between 10 and 25 mg with 5-mg increments resulted in virtually no differences in effects or duration, with a gentle "plus-two" on the Shulgin Rating Scale being reached independently of dose. However, in another publication, Shulgin stated that the dose affected the duration only. The effects of 2CT4-2-EtO have been reported to include "a peaceful meditative inner receptiveness and clarity" and "an honest connection felt with those who were present during the experience". This resulted in the drug being given the nickname "Tenderness". 2CT4-2-EtO also caused uncomfortable sleep.

The chemical synthesis of 2CT4-2-EtO has been described.

2CT4-2-EtO was first described in the literature by Shulgin in PiHKAL in 1991. It was developed and tested by Darrell Lemaire, with publication via personal communication with Shulgin. The drug is a controlled substance in Canada under phenethylamine blanket-ban language.

== See also ==
- TWEETIO (psychedelics)
