= 2CT-5-EtO =

Clinical data
- Other names: 2CT-5EtO; 2CT-5-ETO; 2CT-5ETO; 4-Methylthio-2-methoxy-5-ethoxyphenethylamine; 2-Methoxy-4-methylthio-5-ethoxyphenethylamine
- Routes of administration: Oral
- Drug class: Serotonergic psychedelic; Hallucinogen
- ATC code: None

Pharmacokinetic data
- Duration of action: ~15 hours

Identifiers
- IUPAC name: 2-[5-ethoxy-2-methoxy-4-(methylsulfanyl)phenyl]ethan-1-amine

Chemical and physical data
- Formula: C_{12}H_{19}NO_{2}S
- Molar mass: 241.35 g·mol^{−1}
- 3D model (JSmol): Interactive image
- SMILES: CCOC1=C(SC)C=C(OC)C(CCN)=C1
- InChI: InChI=1S/C12H19NO2S/c1-4-15-11-7-9(5-6-13)10(14-2)8-12(11)16-3/h7-8H,4-6,13H2,1-3H3; Key:CLQNKJUURRUFSX-UHFFFAOYSA-N

2CT-5-EtO, also known as 2-methoxy-4-methylthio-5-ethoxyphenethylamine, is a psychedelic drug of the phenethylamine, 2C, and TWEETIO families related to 2C-T. It is the derivative of 2C-T in which the methoxy group at the 5 position has been replaced with an ethoxy group.

According to Alexander Shulgin in his book PiHKAL (Phenethylamines I Have Known and Loved) and other publications, 2CT-5-EtO's dose is 30 mg orally and its duration is perhaps 15 hours. The effects of 2CT-5-EtO have been reported to include body awareness and modest closed-eye visuals, with the experience being described as quiet, peaceful, contemplative, and insightful. Other effects included insomnia and lots of dreams during sleep.

The chemical synthesis of 2CT-5-EtO has been described.

2CT-5-EtO was first described in the literature by Shulgin in PiHKAL in 1991. It was developed and tested by Darrell Lemaire, with publication via personal communication with Shulgin. The drug is a controlled substance in Canada under phenethylamine blanket-ban language.

== See also ==
- TWEETIO (psychedelics)
