= 2CT7-2-EtO =

Clinical data
- Other names: 2CT7-2EtO; 2CT7-2-ETO; 2CT7-2ETO; 4-Propylthio-2-ethoxy-5-methoxyphenethylamine; 2-Ethoxy-4-propylthio-5-methoxyphenethylamine
- Routes of administration: Oral
- Drug class: Serotonergic psychedelic; Hallucinogen
- ATC code: None

Pharmacokinetic data
- Onset of action: "Quick" or "fast"
- Duration of action: ~5 hours

Identifiers
- IUPAC name: 2-[2-ethoxy-5-methoxy-4-(propylsulfanyl)phenyl]ethan-1-amine

Chemical and physical data
- Formula: C_{14}H_{23}NO_{2}S
- Molar mass: 269.40 g·mol^{−1}
- 3D model (JSmol): Interactive image
- SMILES: NCCC1=C(OCC)C=C(SCCC)C(OC)=C1
- InChI: InChI=1S/C14H23NO2S/c1-4-8-18-14-10-12(17-5-2)11(6-7-15)9-13(14)16-3/h9-10H,4-8,15H2,1-3H3; Key:MSZZWXMFLAAWIT-UHFFFAOYSA-N

2CT7-2-EtO, also known as 4-propylthio-2-ethoxy-5-methoxyphenethylamine, is a psychedelic drug of the phenethylamine, 2C, and TWEETIO families related to 2C-T-7. It is the derivative of 2C-T-7 in which the methoxy group at the 2 position has been replaced with an ethoxy group.

According to Alexander Shulgin in his book PiHKAL (Phenethylamines I Have Known and Loved) and other publications, 2CT7-2-EtO's dose is 20 mg orally and its duration is about 5 hours. It was said to have a "quick" or "fast" onset and to be very short-lived. The effects of 2CT7-2-EtO have been reported to include modest but real closed-eye visuals. In addition, it was said to cause an uncomfortable headache the next day that intuitively seemed to be an after-effect of the drug.

The chemical synthesis of 2CT7-2-EtO has been described.

2CT7-2-EtO was first described in the literature by Shulgin in PiHKAL in 1991. It was developed and tested by Darrell Lemaire, with publication via personal communication with Shulgin. The drug is a controlled substance in Canada under phenethylamine blanket-ban language.

== See also ==
- TWEETIO (psychedelics)
