= 3-Thiomescaline =

Clinical data
- Other names: 3-TM; 3-Methylthio-4,5-dimethoxyphenethylamine; 3,4-Dimethoxy-5-methylthiophenethylamine; 3-MeS-4-MeO-5-MeO-PEA
- Routes of administration: Oral
- Drug class: Serotonergic psychedelic; Hallucinogen
- ATC code: None

Pharmacokinetic data
- Onset of action: ≤1 hour
- Duration of action: 8–12 hours

Identifiers
- IUPAC name: 2-(3,4-dimethoxy-5-methylsulfanylphenyl)ethanamine
- CAS Number: 78335-85-0
- PubChem CID: 44276881
- ChemSpider: 21106411
- UNII: NFD3U63KGL
- ChEMBL: ChEMBL26746

Chemical and physical data
- Formula: C_{11}H_{17}NO_{2}S
- Molar mass: 227.32 g·mol^{−1}
- 3D model (JSmol): Interactive image
- SMILES: COC1=C(C(=CC(=C1)CCN)SC)OC
- InChI: InChI=1S/C11H17NO2S/c1-13-9-6-8(4-5-12)7-10(15-3)11(9)14-2/h6-7H,4-5,12H2,1-3H3; Key:MASUNTXHOBXSNG-UHFFFAOYSA-N

3-Thiomescaline (3-TM), also known as 3-methylthio-4,5-dimethoxyphenethylamine, is a psychedelic drug of the phenethylamine and scaline families related to mescaline (3,4,5-trimethoxyphenethylamine). It is the analogue of mescaline in which the methoxy group at the 3 position has been replaced with a methylthio group. The drug is one of two possible thiomescaline (TM) positional isomers, the other being 4-thiomescaline (4-TM).

In his book PiHKAL (Phenethylamines I Have Known and Loved) and other publications, Alexander Shulgin lists 3-TM's dose as 60 to 100 mg orally and its duration as 8 to 12 hours. Its onset is within 1 hour. The drug has about 4 to 6 times the potency of mescaline. The effects of 3-TM have been reported to include color enhancement, closed-eye imagery and fantasy, no open-eye visuals, auditory–visual synaesthesia with music, intoxication, relaxation, feelings of sublimity and peacefulness, conflicting energy, tension, paranoia, irritability, and guardedness.

The chemical synthesis of 3-TM has been described.

3-TM was first described in the literature by Shulgin and colleagues by 1981. Subsequently, it was described in greater detail by Shulgin in PiHKAL in 1991.

== See also ==
- Scaline
- 4-Thiomescaline
