= DOM-2,5-DiEtO =

Chemical compound

Clinical data
- Other names: DOM-DiEtO; DOM-Di-EtO; DOM-DIETO; DOM-DI-ETO; 2,5-Diethoxy-4-methylamphetamine; 4-Methyl-2,5-diethoxyamphetamine
- Routes of administration: Unknown
- Drug class: Possible stimulant
- ATC code: None

Pharmacokinetic data
- Duration of action: Unknown

Identifiers
- IUPAC name: 1-(2,5-diethoxy-4-methylphenyl)propan-2-amine

Chemical and physical data
- 3D model (JSmol): Interactive image
- SMILES: CCOC1=CC(CC(N)C)=C(OCC)C=C1C
- InChI: InChI=1S/C14H23NO2/c1-5-16-13-9-12(8-11(4)15)14(17-6-2)7-10(13)3/h7,9,11H,5-6,8,15H2,1-4H3; Key:IFOVMAYZCWAFKA-UHFFFAOYSA-N

DOM-2,5-DiEtO, also known as 2,5-diethoxy-4-methylamphetamine, is a drug of the phenethylamine, amphetamine, and DOx families related to the psychedelic drug DOM. It is the derivative of DOM in which the methoxy groups at the 2 and 5 positions have been replaced with ethoxy groups. The properties and effects of DOM-2,5-DiEtO in humans do not appear to be known. Similarly to DOM and DOET however, DOM-2,5-DiEtO has been reported to produce stimulant-like effects in rabbits. The drug was patented by Alexander Shulgin as a potential "CNS stimulant" in 1970. The chemical synthesis of DOM-2,5-DiEtO has been described. Close analogues of DOM-2,5-DiEtO, besides DOM, include Florence (DOM-2-EtO) and Iris (DOM-5-EtO), as well as 2CD-2,5-DiEtO.

== See also ==
- DOx (psychedelics)
- TWEETIO § DOx compounds
