= 2CB-2,5-DiEtO =

Clinical data
- Other names: 2CB-DiEtO; 2CB-Di-EtO; 2CB-DIETO; 2CB-DI-ETO; 2,5-Diethoxy-4-bromophenethylamine; 4-Bromo-2,5-diethoxyphenethylamine
- Routes of administration: Oral
- Drug class: Psychoactive drug
- ATC code: None

Pharmacokinetic data
- Duration of action: Unknown

Identifiers
- IUPAC name: 2-(4-bromo-2,5-diethoxyphenyl)ethan-1-amine

Chemical and physical data
- Formula: C_{12}H_{18}BrNO_{2}
- Molar mass: 288.185 g·mol^{−1}
- 3D model (JSmol): Interactive image
- SMILES: CCOC1=CC(Br)=C(OCC)C=C1CCN
- InChI: InChI=1S/C12H18BrNO2/c1-3-15-11-8-10(13)12(16-4-2)7-9(11)5-6-14/h7-8H,3-6,14H2,1-2H3; Key:KTLSBPPFTWDOMA-UHFFFAOYSA-N

2CB-2,5-DiEtO, also known as 2,5-diethoxy-4-bromophenethylamine, is a psychoactive drug of the phenethylamine, 2C, and TWEETIO families related to the psychedelic drug 2C-B. It is the derivative of 2C-B in which the methoxy groups at the 2 and 5 positions have been replaced with ethoxy groups.

According to Alexander Shulgin in his book PiHKAL (Phenethylamines I Have Known and Loved) and other publications, 2CB-2,5-DiEtO's dose is greater than 55 mg orally and its duration is unknown. The effects of 2CB-2,5-DiEtO have been reported to include only restless sleep and strange dreams. Per Shulgin, no clear active dose level of 2CB-2,5-DiEtO has yet been found.

The chemical synthesis of 2CB-2,5-DiEtO has been described.

2CB-2,5-DiEtO was first described in the literature by Shulgin in PiHKAL in 1991. It was developed and tested by Darrell Lemaire, with publication via personal communication with Shulgin. The drug is a controlled substance in Canada under phenethylamine blanket-ban language.

== See also ==
- TWEETIO (psychedelics)
