= Thiometaescaline =

Thiometaescaline (TME) may refer to the following:

- 3-Thiometaescaline (3-TME)
- 4-Thiometaescaline (4-TME)
- 5-Thiometaescaline (5-TME)

== See also ==
- Scaline
- Thiomescaline
- Thioescaline
