= EEE (drug) =

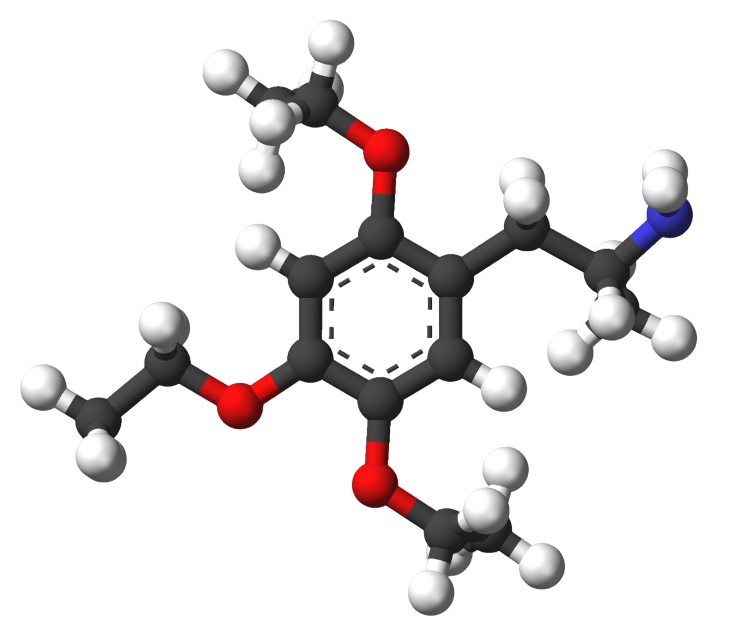

Clinical data
- Other names: 2,4,5-Triethoxyamphetamine; TMA2-2,4,5-TriEtO; TMA2-TriEtO
- Routes of administration: Unknown
- ATC code: None

Pharmacokinetic data
- Duration of action: Unknown

Identifiers
- IUPAC name: 1-(2,4,5-triethoxyphenyl)propan-2-amine
- CAS Number: 23693-42-7
- PubChem CID: 44719557
- ChemSpider: 21106296
- UNII: DY8NEE4XXW
- CompTox Dashboard (EPA): DTXSID60660361

Chemical and physical data
- Formula: C_{15}H_{25}NO_{3}
- Molar mass: 267.369 g·mol^{−1}
- 3D model (JSmol): Interactive image
- SMILES: CCOc1cc(OCC)c(cc1OCC)CC(C)N
- InChI: InChI=1S/C15H25NO3/c1-5-17-13-10-15(19-7-3)14(18-6-2)9-12(13)8-11(4)16/h9-11H,5-8,16H2,1-4H3; Key:PVOHHXSVHWUAMS-UHFFFAOYSA-N

EEE, also known as 2,4,5-triethoxyamphetamine or as TMA2-2,4,5-TriEtO, is a chemical compound of the phenethylamine, amphetamine, and DOx families. It is the analogue of TMA-2 in which the three methoxy groups on the phenyl ring have been replaced with ethoxy groups. In his book PiHKAL (Phenethylamines I Have Known and Loved), Alexander Shulgin lists EEE's dose and duration as unknown. Shulgin stated that EEE has never been tested in humans. The chemical synthesis of EEE has been described. EEE was first described in the scientific literature by Shulgin in 1968. Subsequently, it was described in greater detail by Shulgin in PiHKAL in 1991.

== See also ==
- DOx (psychedelics)
- TWEETIO § DOx compounds
- EEM, EME, and MEE
