= Tenderly (disambiguation) =

"Tenderly" is a popular song written by Walter Gross and Jack Lawrence in 1946.

Tenderly may also refer to:

- Tenderly (film), a 1968 Italian comedy film
- Tenderly (George Benson album), 1989
- Tenderly (Joe Maneri album), 1999
- Tenderly: An Informal Session, an album by Bill Evans, 2001
- Tenderly (Pat Boone album), 1959
- "Tenderly" / "Flow", a single by Disclosure, 2012
- "Tenderly", a song by Emeli Sandé from Long Live the Angels, 2016

== Other uses ==
- Tender (disambiguation)
