= EMM (drug) =

Clinical data
- Other names: 2-Ethoxy-4,5-dimethoxyamphetamine; TMA2-2-EtO
- Routes of administration: Oral
- ATC code: None

Pharmacokinetic data
- Duration of action: Unknown

Identifiers
- IUPAC name: 1-(2,4,5-trimethoxyphenyl)propan-2-amine
- CAS Number: 23693-30-3
- PubChem CID: 44719565
- ChemSpider: 21106299
- UNII: 8S8UH2M5JV
- CompTox Dashboard (EPA): DTXSID40660364

Chemical and physical data
- Formula: C_{13}H_{21}NO_{3}
- Molar mass: 239.315 g·mol^{−1}
- 3D model (JSmol): Interactive image
- SMILES: C1(=CC(=C(C=C1CC(C)N)OC)OC)OCC
- InChI: InChI=1S/C13H21NO3/c1-5-17-11-8-13(16-4)12(15-3)7-10(11)6-9(2)14/h7-9H,5-6,14H2,1-4H3; Key:SKRNTJDDBVAEGB-UHFFFAOYSA-N

EMM, also known as 2-ethoxy-4,5-dimethoxyamphetamine or as TMA2-2-EtO, is a chemical compound of the phenethylamine, amphetamine, and DOx families related to the psychedelic drug TMA-2. It is the analogue of TMA-2 in which the methoxy group at the 2 position has been replaced with an ethoxy group. In his book PiHKAL (Phenethylamines I Have Known and Loved) and other publications, Alexander Shulgin lists EMM's dose as greater than 50 mg orally and its duration as unknown. The drug produced no effects at doses of up to 50 mg. Higher doses were not tested. The chemical synthesis of EMM has been described. EMM was first described in the scientific literature by Shulgin in 1968. Subsequently, it was described in greater detail by Shulgin in PiHKAL in 1991.

== See also ==
- DOx (psychedelics)
- TWEETIO § DOx compounds
- MEM and MME
