= 4-Thiomescaline =

Clinical data
- Other names: 4-TM; Thiomescaline; 3,5-Dimethoxy-4-methylthiophenethylamine; 4-Methylthio-3,5-dimethoxyphenethylamine; 3-MeO-4-MeS-5-MeO-PEA
- Routes of administration: Oral
- Drug class: Serotonergic psychedelic; Hallucinogen
- ATC code: None

Pharmacokinetic data
- Onset of action: 30–60 minutes
- Duration of action: 10–15 hours

Identifiers
- IUPAC name: 2-(3,5-dimethoxy-4-methylsulfanylphenyl)ethanamine
- CAS Number: 71539-35-0
- PubChem CID: 44276771
- ChemSpider: 21106392
- UNII: XK4EK4XXP6
- ChEMBL: ChEMBL27464
- CompTox Dashboard (EPA): DTXSID90658130

Chemical and physical data
- Formula: C_{11}H_{17}NO_{2}S
- Molar mass: 227.32 g·mol^{−1}
- 3D model (JSmol): Interactive image
- SMILES: COC1=CC(=CC(=C1SC)OC)CCN
- InChI: InChI=1S/C11H17NO2S/c1-13-9-6-8(4-5-12)7-10(14-2)11(9)15-3/h6-7H,4-5,12H2,1-3H3; Key:FYTOAZIRBXNPKZ-UHFFFAOYSA-N

4-Thiomescaline (4-TM), or simply thiomescaline, also known as 3,5-dimethoxy-4-methylthiophenethylamine, is a psychedelic drug of the phenethylamine and scaline families related to mescaline (3,4,5-trimethoxyphenethylamine). It is the analogue of mescaline in which the methoxy group at the 4 position has been replaced with a methylthio group. The drug is one of two possible thiomescaline (TM) positional isomers, the other being 3-thiomescaline (3-TM).

In his book PiHKAL (Phenethylamines I Have Known and Loved) and other publications, Alexander Shulgin lists 4-TM's dose as 20 to 40 mg orally and its duration as 10 to 15 hours. Its onset is 30 to 60 minutes. The drug has about 10 times the potency of mescaline. The effects of 4-TM have been reported to include slight color enhancement, closed-eye imagery, fantasy, feeling strange, feelings of unreality, visions of Möbius strips, introspection, insights, lightheadedness, physical uneasiness, tremor, abdominal cramps, walking difficulty, appetite loss, and parasthesia. Shulgin described it as a "mixed bag of responses". It was described as being more similar in its effects to LSD than to mescaline and as being similar in effects to the Aleph series.

The chemical synthesis of 4-TM has been described.

4-TM was first synthesized and tested in 1977 and was described in the literature by Shulgin and colleagues in 1978. Subsequently, it was described in greater detail by Shulgin in PiHKAL in 1991.

== See also ==
- Scaline
- 3-Thiomescaline
