= Methylmescaline =

Methylmescaline is a methylated derivative of mescaline that may refer to:

- N-Methylmescaline
- 3,4,5-Trimethoxyamphetamine (TMA; α-methylmescaline)
- 2-Methylmescaline
- Escaline (M-4-EtO)
- Metaescaline (M-3-EtO)

== See also ==
- Dimethylmescaline
- TWEETIO § Scalines
- Methyl-DOM
- Methyl-TMA-2
