= C11H16INO2 =

The molecular formula C_{11}H_{16}INO_{2} may refer to:

- 2CI-2-EtO
- 2,5-Dimethoxy-4-iodoamphetamine
- N-Methyl-2C-I
