= Tenderness =

Tenderness may refer to:

== Film ==
- Tenderness (1930 film), a French drama film
- Tenderness (2009 film), an American crime film
- Tenderness (2017 film), an Italian drama film

== Medicine ==
- Tenderness (medicine), pain or discomfort when an affected area is touched
- Rebound tenderness, a clinical sign that a doctor may detect in physical examination of a patient's abdomen

== Music ==
=== Albums ===
- Tenderness (Al Jarreau album), 1994
- Tenderness (Blue Hawaii album) or the title song, 2017
- Tenderness (Duff McKagan album) or the title song, 2019
- Tenderness (JD Souther album), 2015
- Tenderness (Kip Hanrahan album), 1990
- Tenderness (Walt Dickerson and Richard Davis album) or the title song, 1985
- Tenderness, by the Ohio Players, 1981

=== Songs ===
- "Tenderness" (General Public song), 1984
- "Tenderness" (Soviet song), 1965
- "Tenderness", by Diana Ross from Diana, 1980
- "Tenderness", by Janis Ian from Revenge, 1995
- "Tenderness", by Laura Branigan from Hold Me, 1985
- "Tenderness", by Parquet Courts from Wide Awake!, 2018
- "Tenderness", by Paul Simon from There Goes Rhymin' Simon, 1973
- "Tenderness", by Steppenwolf from For Ladies Only, 1971

== Other uses ==
- Tenderness (drug), a nickname of the psychedelic-related drug 2CT4-2-EtO
- Tenderness (novel), a 1997 novel by Robert Cormier
- Tenderness (sculpture), a marble sculpture by Paul Lancz, in Montreal, Quebec, Canada
- Hardiness (plants) (in)ability to withstand freezing temperatures
- Meat tenderness, a gauge of meat palatability

== See also ==
- Tender (disambiguation)
- Term of endearment
- Affection
- Care (disambiguation)
- Kindness
- Love
