= Iris (drug) =

IRIS

Clinical data
- Other names: IRIS; 2-Methoxy-5-ethoxy-4-methylamphetamine; DOM-5ETO; DOM-5EtO
- Routes of administration: Oral
- ATC code: None

Pharmacokinetic data
- Duration of action: Unknown

Identifiers
- IUPAC name: 1-(5-ethoxy-2-methoxy-4-methylphenyl)propan-2-amine
- CAS Number: 952016-59-0
- PubChem CID: 44719575
- ChemSpider: 21106327
- UNII: V3WW7XL92Q
- CompTox Dashboard (EPA): DTXSID20660367

Chemical and physical data
- Formula: C_{13}H_{21}NO_{2}
- Molar mass: 223.316 g·mol^{−1}
- 3D model (JSmol): Interactive image
- SMILES: COc1cc(C)c(cc1CC(C)N)OCC
- InChI: InChI=1S/C13H21NO2/c1-5-16-12-8-11(7-10(3)14)13(15-4)6-9(12)2/h6,8,10H,5,7,14H2,1-4H3; Key:IPJRCKIREPMKNE-UHFFFAOYSA-N

Iris, also known as 2-methoxy-5-ethoxy-4-methylamphetamine or as DOM-5ETO, is a chemical compound of the phenethylamine, amphetamine, and DOx families related to DOM. It is derivative of DOM in which the methoxy group at the 5 position has been replaced with an ethoxy group.

In his book PiHKAL (Phenethylamines I Have Known and Loved), Alexander Shulgin lists Iris's dose as greater than 9 mg orally and its duration as unknown. The effects of Iris at tested doses included possible threshold effects and lightheadedness. No clear hallucinogenic or other effects were described and higher doses were not tested. The drug is one of Shulgin's "ten classic ladies", a series of methylated DOM derivatives.

The chemical synthesis of Iris has been described.

Iris was first described in the literature in a patent by Shulgin in 1970. Subsequently, it was described in greater detail by Shulgin PiHKAL in 1991. It is not an explicitly controlled substance in the United States, but may be considered scheduled as an isomer of DOET. Iris is a controlled substance in Canada due to phenethylamine blanket-ban language.

== See also ==
- DOx (psychedelics)
- TWEETIO § DOx compounds
- 2CD-5EtO
- Beatrice (N-methyl-DOM)
- Florence (DOM-2ETO)
- DOM-2,5-DiEtO
- MME (TMA2-5-EtO)
