= Tender (surname) =

Tender is a surname. Notable people with the surname include:

- Manuela Tender (born 1971), Portuguese teacher, politician and former member of the Assembly of the Republic
- Ovidiu Tender (born 1956), Romanian businessman
- Priit Tender (born 1971), Estonian animator and animated film director

== See also ==
- Tender (disambiguation)
