= 4-Thioescaline =

Clinical data
- Other names: 4-TE; Thioescaline; 3,5-Dimethoxy-4-ethylthiophenethylamine; 4-Ethylthio-3,5-dimethoxyphenethylamine
- Routes of administration: Oral
- Drug class: Serotonergic psychedelic; Hallucinogen
- ATC code: None

Pharmacokinetic data
- Onset of action: 40 minutes Peak: 2 hours
- Duration of action: 9–12 hours (but up to 15 hours)

Identifiers
- IUPAC name: 2-(4-ethylsulfanyl-3,5-dimethoxyphenyl)ethanamine
- CAS Number: 90109-49-2
- PubChem CID: 44349999
- ChemSpider: 21106391
- UNII: 7YBD9MZP7J
- ChEMBL: ChEMBL340722
- CompTox Dashboard (EPA): DTXSID301336273

Chemical and physical data
- Formula: C_{12}H_{19}NO_{2}S
- Molar mass: 241.35 g·mol^{−1}
- 3D model (JSmol): Interactive image
- SMILES: CCSC1=C(C=C(C=C1OC)CCN)OC
- InChI: InChI=1S/C12H19NO2S/c1-4-16-12-10(14-2)7-9(5-6-13)8-11(12)15-3/h7-8H,4-6,13H2,1-3H3; Key:JUZZKKJLOWQNPC-UHFFFAOYSA-N

4-Thioescaline (4-TE), or thioescaline, also known as 3,5-dimethoxy-4-ethylthiophenethylamine, is a psychedelic drug of the phenethylamine and scaline families related to mescaline. It is the analogue of escaline in which the methoxy group at the 4 position has been replaced with a methylthio group. The drug is one of two possible thioescaline (TE) positional isomers, the other being 3-thioescaline (3-TE).

In his book PiHKAL (Phenethylamines I Have Known and Loved) and other publications, Alexander Shulgin lists 4-thioescaline's dose as 20 to 30 mg orally and its duration as 9 to 12 hours (but up to 15 hours). Its onset is 40 minutes and time to peak is 2 hours. The drug has approximately 10 to 20 times the potency of mescaline and is among the most potent thioscalines.

The effects of 4-thioescaline have been reported to include closed-eye imagery and fantasy, open-eye visuals, sensuousness, feelings of energy, clean experience, clear-headedness and clarity of thought, introspection and insights, easy talking and communication, cloudiness, feeling disconnected, feelings of complex depth without definition, feeling depleted, body awareness, body tingling, heavy body load, feeling jangly, body heaviness, pupil dilation, flushing, nausea, and lasting afterglow. One person remarked that it was marvelous, very beautiful, joyous, and sensuous, while another said that there was not enough mental to balance the physical. According to Shulgin, 4-thioescaline produces a state of perceptual distortion, tactile responsiveness, and mood enhancement like euphoria and easy humor that closely resembles that of mescaline.

The chemical synthesis of 4-thioescaline has been described.

4-Thioescaline was first described in the scientific literature by Alexander Shulgin and Peyton Jacob III in 1984. Subsequently, it was described in greater detail by Shulgin in PiHKAL in 1991.

== See also ==
- Scaline
- 3-Thioescaline
