= TWEETIO =

Group of psychedelic drugs

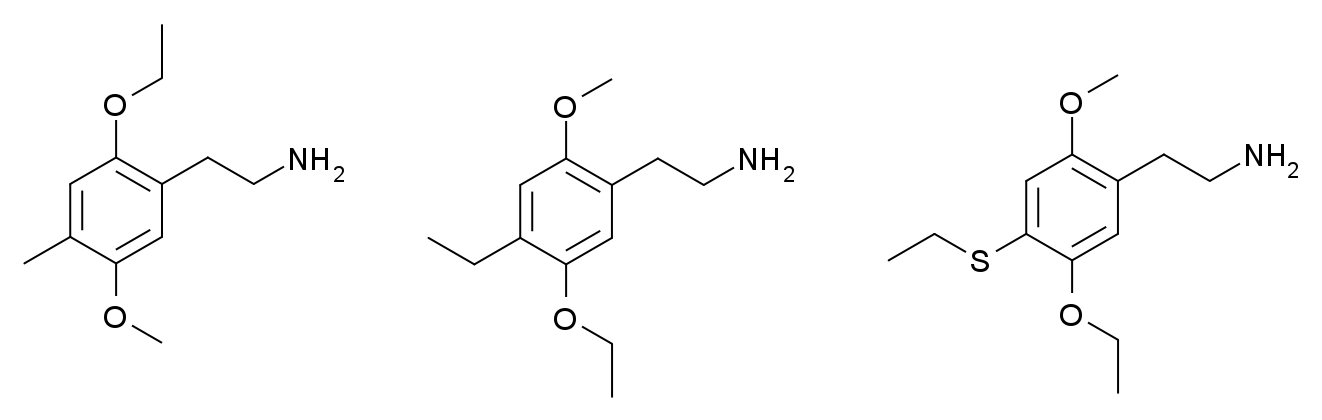
Examples of TWEETIO drugs. These are 2CD-2-EtO (left), 2CE-5-EtO (center), and 2CT2-5-EtO (right).

TWEETIO is a family of phenethylamine psychedelic drugs. They are analogues of the 2C drugs (4-substituted 2,5-dimethoxyphenethylamines) in which one or both of the methoxy groups at positions 2 and 5 of the phenyl ring have been lengthened to ethoxy groups. Examples include 2CD-2-EtO (a TWEETIO of 2C-D), 2CE-5-EtO (a TWEETIO of 2C-E), and 2CT2-5-EtO (a TWEETIO of 2C-T-2), among many others.

The TWEETIO drugs are said to have been named in a humorous way by pronouncing the simplest structural form of "2-EtO-X". Limited human data are available on the TWEETIO compounds. In any case, some generalizations have been made, including that the 2-EtO compounds tend to have a shorter duration and decreased potency, the 5-EtO drugs tend to have enhanced potency and remarkably increased durations, and the 2,5-DiEtO drugs tend to be inactive.

The TWEETIO compounds were developed by Darrell Lemaire as potential "smart drugs" in the 1970s or 1980s. The compounds were described in the scientific literature by Alexander Shulgin via personal communication with Lemaire in the 1990s and 2000s. It was said by Shulgin in 2003 that the propoxy analogues had not yet been synthesized. In 2023, the propoxy derivative ASR-2001 (2CB-5PrO) was reported by Nick Cozzi and Paul F. Daley of the Alexander Shulgin Research Institute. It is under development for potential medical use.

== List and properties of TWEETIO drugs ==
TWEETIO analogues of selected 2C drugs
R_{4}	Parent	Parent dose	R_{2}	R_{5}	Code name	Trial dose	Comments of trial
Br-	2C-B	12–24 mg	Et-	Me-	2CB-2-EtO	15 mg	"30–50 [mg] prolongs action"
Br-	2C-B	12–24 mg	Et-	Et-	2CB-DiEtO	>55 mg	"restless sleep, only"
Me-	2C-D	20–60 mg	Et-	Me-	2CD-2-EtO	60 mg	"intimate, no intox, 4 hrs"
Me-	2C-D	20–60 mg	Me-	Et-	2CD-5-EtO	50 mg	"12 hour duration"
Me-	2C-D	20–60 mg	Et-	Et-	2CD-DiEtO	>55 mg	"mild, 4 hr duration"
Et-	2C-E	10–15 mg	Me-	Et-	2CE-5-EtO	15 mg	"16–24 hr duration"
I-	2C-I	14–22 mg	Et-	Me-	2CI-2-EtO	5 mg	"50 mg longer duration only"
MeS-	2C-T	60–100 mg	Et-	Me-	2CT-2-EtO	50 mg	"mild, 4 hr duration"
MeS-	2C-T	60–100 mg	Me-	Et-	2CT-5-EtO	30 mg	"15 hr duration"
EtS-	2C-T-2	12–25 mg	Et-	Me-	2CT2-2-EtO	50 mg	"9 hr duration"
EtS-	2C-T-2	12–25 mg	Me-	Et-	2CT2-5-EtO	20 mg	"16 hr duration"
EtS-	2C-T-2	12–25 mg	Et-	Et-	2CT2-DiEtO	50 mg	"only longer with higher dose"
iPrS-	2C-T-4	8–20 mg	Et-	Me-	2CT4-2-EtO	25 mg	"dosage affects duration only"
PrS-	2C-T-7	10–30 mg	Et-	Me-	2CT7-2-EtO	20 mg	"fast, out at 5 hrs"

Alexander Shulgin also described some of these compounds in additional detail in his book PiHKAL (Phenethylamines I Have Known and Loved).

According to Shulgin in 2011, 2CB-5-EtO is not in the published scientific literature. In a 1994 literature review however, Shulgin described 2CB-5-EtO as being active but 2-fold less potent than 2C-B.

ASR-2001 (2CB-5PrO), a non-hallucinogenic TWEETIO analogue of 2C-B with a 5-propoxy group, is under development by the Alexander Shulgin Research Institute for use as a mild stimulant-like medication for the treatment of psychiatric disorders.

Another known TWEETIO-related drug, a 2C-E analogue with a 5-isopropoxy group, is 2CE-5-iPrO.

== Related compounds ==
=== DOx compounds ===
Various DOx compounds featured extended methoxy groups at the 2, 4, and/or 5 positions. These include the DOM derivatives Florence (DOM-2-EtO), Iris (DOM-5-EtO), and DOM-2,5-DiEtO and the TMA-2 (DOMeO) derivatives EMM (TMA2-2-EtO), MEM (TMA2-4-EtO), MME (TMA2-5-EtO), EEM (TMA2-2,4-DiEtO), EME (TMA2-2,5-DiEtO), MEE (TMA2-4,5-DiEtO), EEE (TMA2-2,4,5-TriEtO), and MPM (TMA2-4-PrO), among others.

=== Scalines ===
Various scalines, or mescaline analogues, featured extended methoxy groups. These include asymbescaline, escaline, metaescaline, metaproscaline, proscaline, symbescaline, and trisescaline (trescaline), among others.

=== MDxx compounds ===
EMDA-2 (2-ethoxy-4,5-methylenedioxyamphetamine) has been described by Alexander Shulgin as the "TWEETIO" analogue of MMDA-2. It is active as a psychedelic, producing closed-eye visuals and other effects, with a potency of about one-third that of MMDA-2 and a duration of 10 to 12 hours.

== See also ==
- 2C (psychedelics)
- Substituted methoxyphenethylamine
