= 3-Thiometaescaline =

Clinical data
- Other names: 3-TME; 3-Ethylthio-4,5-dimethoxyphenethylamine; 4,5-Dimethoxy-3-ethylthiophenethylamine; 3-EtS-4-MeO-5-MeO-PEA
- Routes of administration: Oral
- Drug class: Serotonergic psychedelic; Hallucinogen
- ATC code: None

Pharmacokinetic data
- Onset of action: "Quite early"
- Duration of action: 10–15 hours

Identifiers
- IUPAC name: 2-(3-ethylsulfanyl-4,5-dimethoxyphenyl)ethanamine
- CAS Number: 90132-35-7
- PubChem CID: 44350009
- ChemSpider: 21106407
- UNII: L3BC6MZN9Y
- ChEMBL: ChEMBL126264
- CompTox Dashboard (EPA): DTXSID501336229

Chemical and physical data
- Formula: C_{12}H_{19}NO_{2}S
- Molar mass: 241.35 g·mol^{−1}
- 3D model (JSmol): Interactive image
- SMILES: CCSC1=CC(=CC(=C1OC)OC)CCN
- InChI: InChI=1S/C12H19NO2S/c1-4-16-11-8-9(5-6-13)7-10(14-2)12(11)15-3/h7-8H,4-6,13H2,1-3H3; Key:WHUXWWJFRBXUOQ-UHFFFAOYSA-N

3-Thiometaescaline (3-TME), also known as 3-ethylthio-4,5-dimethoxyphenethylamine, is a psychedelic drug of the phenethylamine and scaline families related to mescaline. It is the analogue of metaescaline in which the ethoxy group at the 3 position has been replaced with an ethylthio group. The drug is one of three possible positional isomers of thiometaescaline (TME), the others being 4-thiometaescaline (4-TME) and 5-thiometaescaline (5-TME).

In his book PiHKAL (Phenethylamines I Have Known and Loved) and other publications, Alexander Shulgin lists 3-TME's dose as 60 to 100 mg orally and its duration as 10 to 15 hours. Its onset is "quite early" and substantial effects occur by 1.5 hours. The drug is approximately 4 to 6 times as potent as mescaline. The effects of 3-TME have been reported to include introspection and insights, disinhibition, easy humor, sleep disturbances, and increased psychological strength after the experience. One person reported it as producing a "remarkable state" and another remarked that it was a kind of experience that should be had once a year if not more often. No visual or other perceptual effects were mentioned.

The chemical synthesis of 3-TME has been described.

3-TME was first described in the scientific literature by Alexander Shulgin and Peyton Jacob III in 1984. Subsequently, it was described in greater detail by Shulgin in PiHKAL in 1991.

== See also ==
- Scaline
- 4-Thiometaescaline
- 5-Thiometaescaline
