= Dimethylmescaline =

Dimethylmescaline is a derivative of mescaline that may refer to:

- Trichocereine (N,N-dimethylmescaline)
- Methyl-TMA (α,N-dimethylmescaline)
- 2,6-Dimethylmescaline (DMe-M)
- Asymbescaline (M-3,4-DiEtO)
- Symbescaline (M-3,5-DiEtO)

== See also ==
- Methylmescaline
