= 4-Thiometaescaline =

Clinical data
- Other names: 4-TME; 3-Ethoxy-4-methylthio-5-methoxyphenethylamine; 3-Ethoxy-5-methoxy-4-methylthiophenethylamine
- Routes of administration: Oral
- Drug class: Psychoactive drug
- ATC code: None

Pharmacokinetic data
- Duration of action: 10–15 hours

Identifiers
- IUPAC name: 2-(3-ethoxy-5-methoxy-4-methylsulfanylphenyl)ethanamine
- CAS Number: 90109-47-0
- PubChem CID: 44350008
- ChemSpider: 21106406
- UNII: V9WQU6U4MA
- ChEMBL: ChEMBL421670
- CompTox Dashboard (EPA): DTXSID30658371

Chemical and physical data
- Formula: C_{12}H_{19}NO_{2}S
- Molar mass: 241.35 g·mol^{−1}
- 3D model (JSmol): Interactive image
- SMILES: CCOC1=CC(=CC(=C1SC)OC)CCN
- InChI: InChI=1S/C12H19NO2S/c1-4-15-11-8-9(5-6-13)7-10(14-2)12(11)16-3/h7-8H,4-6,13H2,1-3H3; Key:ACLYMWAQSAEILP-UHFFFAOYSA-N

4-Thiometaescaline (4-TME), also known as 3-ethoxy-4-methylthio-5-methoxyphenethylamine, is a psychoactive drug of the phenethylamine and scaline families related to mescaline. It is the analogue of metaescaline in which the methoxy group at the 4 position has been replaced with a methylthio group. The drug is one of three possible positional isomers of thiometaescaline (TME), the others being 3-thiometaescaline (3-TME) and 5-thiometaescaline (5-TME).

In his book PiHKAL (Phenethylamines I Have Known and Loved) and other publications, Alexander Shulgin lists 4-TME's dose as 60 to 100 mg orally and its duration as 10 to 15 hours. The drug has approximately 4 times the potency of mescaline, though its effects are very different. The effects of 4-TME have been reported to include mild mental changes that were neither visual nor particularly interesting, a strange off-baseness, feeling sad and morbid, mild gastrointestinal disturbances, sleep disturbances, and subsequent-day negative effects like lethargy and emotional disconnection. It was described as being more toxic than joyous. No clear hallucinogenic or perceptual effects were described.

The chemical synthesis of 4-TME has been described. It is said to have a very small yield.

4-TME was first described in the scientific literature by Alexander Shulgin and Peyton Jacob III in 1984. Subsequently, it was described in greater detail by Shulgin in PiHKAL in 1991.

== See also ==
- Scaline
- 3-Thiometaescaline
- 5-Thiometaescaline
