= 3-Thioescaline =

Clinical data
- Other names: 3-TE; 3-Methoxy-4-ethoxy-5-methylthiophenethylamine; 4-Ethoxy-3-methoxy-5-methylthiophenethylamine; 4-Ethoxy-5-methoxy-3-methylthiophenethylamine
- Routes of administration: Oral
- Drug class: Serotonergic psychedelic; Hallucinogen
- ATC code: None

Pharmacokinetic data
- Duration of action: 8–12 hours

Identifiers
- IUPAC name: 2-(4-ethoxy-3-methoxy-5-methylsulfanylphenyl)ethanamine
- CAS Number: 90132-37-9
- PubChem CID: 44350018
- ChemSpider: 21106410
- UNII: HS9Q2YB7D3
- ChEMBL: ChEMBL330874
- CompTox Dashboard (EPA): DTXSID50658373

Chemical and physical data
- Formula: C_{12}H_{19}NO_{2}S
- Molar mass: 241.35 g·mol^{−1}
- 3D model (JSmol): Interactive image
- SMILES: CCOC1=C(C=C(C=C1SC)CCN)OC
- InChI: InChI=1S/C12H19NO2S/c1-4-15-12-10(14-2)7-9(5-6-13)8-11(12)16-3/h7-8H,4-6,13H2,1-3H3; Key:LRYPRFGBZRIFIX-UHFFFAOYSA-N

3-Thioescaline (3-TE), also known as 3-methoxy-4-ethoxy-5-methylthiophenethylamine, is a psychedelic drug of the phenethylamine and scaline families related to mescaline. It is the analogue of escaline in which the methoxy group at the 3 position has been replaced with a methylthio group. The drug is one of two possible thioescaline (TE) positional isomers, the other being 4-thioescaline (4-TE).

In his book PiHKAL (Phenethylamines I Have Known and Loved) and other publications, Alexander Shulgin lists 3-thioescaline's dose as 60 to 80 mg orally and its duration as 8 to 12 hours. The drug has approximately 5 or 6 times the potency of mescaline. The effects of 3-thioescaline have been reported to include closed-eye imagery and fantasy, sounds having a deeper pitch, introspection, enhanced appreciation of art and music, time dilation, body load, and sleep disturbances. It was said to be psychedelic rather than just intoxicating. The desired psychoactive effects were said to outweigh its physical side effects.

The chemical synthesis of 3-thioescaline has been described.

3-Thioescaline was first described in the scientific literature by Alexander Shulgin and Peyton Jacob III in 1984. Subsequently, it was described in greater detail by Shulgin in PiHKAL in 1991.

== See also ==
- Scaline
- 4-Thioescaline
