= 5-Thiometaescaline =

Clinical data
- Other names: 5-TME; 3-Ethoxy-4-methoxy-5-methylthiophenethylamine; 3-EtO-4-MeO-5-MeS-PEA
- Routes of administration: Oral
- ATC code: None

Pharmacokinetic data
- Duration of action: Unknown

Identifiers
- IUPAC name: 2-(3-ethoxy-4-methoxy-5-methylsulfanylphenyl)ethanamine
- CAS Number: 90132-39-1
- PubChem CID: 44374913
- ChemSpider: 21106385
- UNII: FSA7T3D9DJ
- ChEMBL: ChEMBL160106

Chemical and physical data
- Formula: C_{12}H_{19}NO_{2}S
- Molar mass: 241.35 g·mol^{−1}
- 3D model (JSmol): Interactive image
- SMILES: CCOC1=C(C(=CC(=C1)CCN)SC)OC
- InChI: InChI=1S/C12H19NO2S/c1-4-15-10-7-9(5-6-13)8-11(16-3)12(10)14-2/h7-8H,4-6,13H2,1-3H3; Key:BRABKKMYSDDDCR-UHFFFAOYSA-N

5-Thiometaescaline (5-TME), also known as 3-ethoxy-4-methoxy-5-methylthiophenethylamine, is a psychoactive drug of the phenethylamine and scaline families related to mescaline. It is the analogue of metaescaline in which the methoxy group at the 5 position has been replaced with a methylthio group. The drug is one of three possible positional isomers of thiometaescaline (TME), the others being 3-thiometaescaline (3-TME) and 4-thiometaescaline (4-TME).

In his book PiHKAL (Phenethylamines I Have Known and Loved) and other publications, Alexander Shulgin lists 5-TME's dose as greater than 200 mg orally and its duration as unknown. The effects of 5-TME have been reported to include possible tinnitus, a possible brush of lightheadedness, and nothing else, but these changes could not be clearly ascribed to the drug.

The chemical synthesis of 5-TME has been described.

5-TME was first described in the scientific literature by Alexander Shulgin and Peyton Jacob III in 1984. Subsequently, it was described in greater detail by Shulgin in PiHKAL in 1991.

== See also ==
- Scaline
- 3-Thiometaescaline
- 4-Thiometaescaline
