= Florence (drug) =

Clinical data
- Other names: FLORENCE; DOM-2ETO; 2-Ethoxy-5-methoxy-4-methylamphetamine; 2-Ethoxy-4-methyl-5-methoxyamphetamine
- Routes of administration: Unknown
- ATC code: None

Pharmacokinetic data
- Duration of action: Unknown

Identifiers
- IUPAC name: 1-(2-ethoxy-5-methoxy-4-methylphenyl)propan-2-amine

Chemical and physical data
- Formula: C_{13}H_{21}NO_{2}
- Molar mass: 223.316 g·mol^{−1}
- 3D model (JSmol): Interactive image
- SMILES: CCOc1cc(C)c(cc1CC(N)C)OC
- InChI: InChI=1S/C13H21NO2/c1-5-16-13-6-9(2)12(15-4)8-11(13)7-10(3)14/h6,8,10H,5,7,14H2,1-4H3; Key:JGTKJASRYQAIDY-UHFFFAOYSA-N

Florence, also known as 2-ethoxy-5-methoxy-4-methylamphetamine or as DOM-2ETO, is a chemical compound of the phenethylamine, amphetamine, and DOx families related to DOM. It is the derivative of DOM in which the methoxy group at the 2 position has been replaced with an ethoxy group analogously to in the TWEETIO series. According to Alexander Shulgin in his book PiHKAL (Phenethylamines I Have Known and Loved), Florence may have been synthesized but is not known to have been tested. Along with its positional isomer Iris (DOM-5ETO), the compound is one of Shulgin's "ten classic ladies", a series of methylated DOM derivatives. Florence was first described in the literature by at least 1970. The drug is not an explicitly controlled substance in the United States, but may be considered scheduled as an isomer of DOET. It is a controlled substance in Canada due to phenethylamine blanket-ban language.

== See also ==
- DOx (psychedelics)
- TWEETIO § DOx compounds
- Iris (DOM-5ETO)
- DOM-2,5-DiEtO
