= EEM (drug) =

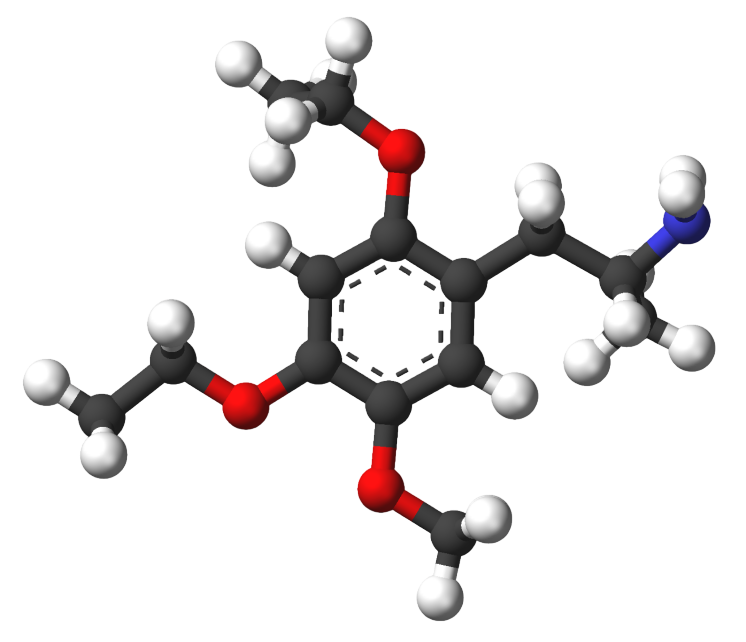

Clinical data
- Other names: 2,4-Diethoxy-5-methoxyamphetamine; TMA2-2,4-DiEtO
- Routes of administration: Oral
- ATC code: None

Pharmacokinetic data
- Duration of action: Unknown

Identifiers
- IUPAC name: 1-(2,4-diethoxy-5-methoxyphenyl)propan-2-amine
- CAS Number: 23693-33-6
- PubChem CID: 44719558
- ChemSpider: 21106297
- UNII: EYL9ME7KPM
- CompTox Dashboard (EPA): DTXSID20660362

Chemical and physical data
- Formula: C_{14}H_{23}NO_{3}
- Molar mass: 253.342 g·mol^{−1}
- 3D model (JSmol): Interactive image
- SMILES: CCOc1cc(OCC)c(cc1OC)CC(C)N
- InChI: InChI=1S/C14H23NO3/c1-5-17-12-9-14(18-6-2)13(16-4)8-11(12)7-10(3)15/h8-10H,5-7,15H2,1-4H3; Key:SAFDWWQYGOOGMX-UHFFFAOYSA-N

EEM, also known as 2,4-diethoxy-5-methoxyamphetamine or as TMA2-2,4-DiEtO, is a chemical compound of the phenethylamine, amphetamine, and DOx families related to the psychedelic drug TMA-2. It is the analogue of TMA-2 in which the methoxy groups at the 2 and 4 positions have been replaced with ethoxy groups. In his book PiHKAL (Phenethylamines I Have Known and Loved), Alexander Shulgin lists EEM's dose and duration as unknown. Shulgin stated that EEM has never been tested in humans. The chemical synthesis of EEM has been described. EEM was first described in the scientific literature by Shulgin in 1968. Subsequently, it was described in greater detail by Shulgin in PiHKAL in 1991.

== See also ==
- DOx (psychedelics)
- TWEETIO § DOx compounds
- EME, MEE, and EEE
