= Thiomescaline =

Thiomescaline (TM) may refer to the following:

- 3-Thiomescaline (3-TM)
- 4-Thiomescaline (4-TM; thiomescaline)

== See also ==
- Scaline
- Thioescaline
- Thioproscaline
- Thiobuscaline
