= 2CD-5EtO =

Chemical compound

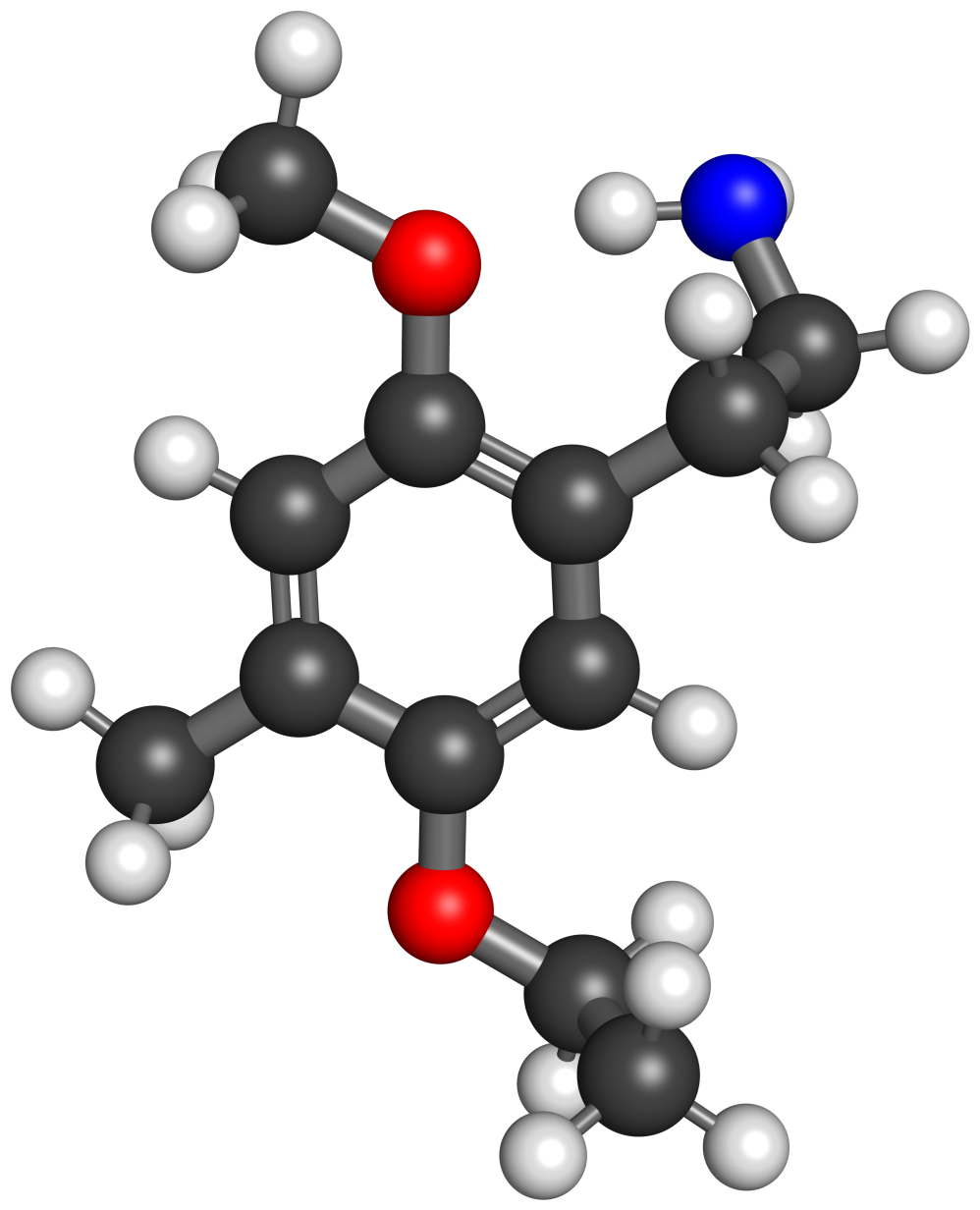

Clinical data
- Other names: 2C-D-5-EtO; 2CD-5-EtO; 5-Ethoxy-2-methoxy-4-methylphenethylamine; 2-Methoxy-5-ethoxy-4-methylphenethylamine; 4-Methyl-2-methoxy-5-ethoxyphenethylamine; 2-Methoxy-4-methyl-5-ethoxyphenethylamine
- Routes of administration: Oral
- Drug class: Psychoactive drug

Pharmacokinetic data
- Onset of action: ~2 hours (peak)
- Duration of action: 12 hours

Identifiers
- IUPAC name: 1-(5-ethoxy-2-methoxy-4-methylphenyl)-ethan-1-amine
- CAS Number: 1354634-32-4
- PubChem CID: 57458864
- ChemSpider: 26234937
- UNII: 8HT47SKY9C
- CompTox Dashboard (EPA): DTXSID701029521

Chemical and physical data
- Formula: C_{12}H_{19}NO_{2}
- Molar mass: 209.289 g·mol^{−1}
- 3D model (JSmol): Interactive image
- SMILES: CCOC1=CC(=C(C=C1C)OC)CCN
- InChI: InChI=1S/C12H19NO2/c1-4-15-11-8-10(5-6-13)12(14-3)7-9(11)2/h7-8H,4-6,13H2,1-3H3; Key:ZMQDQUPRBYFPSO-UHFFFAOYSA-N

2CD-5EtO, also known as 5-ethoxy-2-methoxy-4-methylphenethylamine, is a psychoactive drug of the phenethylamine, 2C, and TWEETIO families related to 2C-D. It is the analogue of 2C-D in which the methoxy group at the 5 position has been extended to an ethoxy group.

In his book PiHKAL (Phenethylamines I Have Known and Loved) and other publications, Alexander Shulgin lists 2CD-5EtO's dose as 40 to 50 mg orally, its onset as slow and gradual, its time to peak or full effects as about 2 hours, and its duration as 12 hours. The effects of 2CD-5EtO were said to include being "largely free from excitement", having "a friendly openness and outgoingness that allowed easy talk, interaction, humor", and allowing for healthy appetite.

The chemical synthesis of 2CD-5EtO has been described.

2CD-5EtO was first described in the literature by Alexander Shulgin in his book PiHKAL (Phenethylamines I Have Known and Loved) in 1991. It was developed and tested by Darrell Lemaire, with publication via personal communication with Shulgin. 2CD-5EtO is a controlled substance in Canada under phenethylamine blanket-ban language.

== See also ==
- TWEETIO (psychedelics)
- Iris (DOM-5ETO)
