= Tender =

Tender may refer to:

- Tender (surname), surname

== Entertainment ==
- Tender (film), a 2020 short film by Felicia Pride
- Tender (Wishbone Ash album), 2008
- Tender (Lady Maisery album), 2022, or its title track
- "Tender" (song), by Blur
- Tender (band), a British music duo formed in 2015
- "Tender" (Feeder song), a 2005 song
- "Tender", a song by Monaco from their 1997 album Music for Pleasure
- "Tender", a song by Tesseract from their 2023 album War of Being
- "Tender", an unreleased song by SZA

== Transportation ==
- Tender (rail), a type of railroad car
- Ship's tender
- Cannery tender
- Destroyer tender
- Submarine tender, a naval support vessel
- Lighthouse tender
- Mail tender
- Motor torpedo boat tender
- Seaplane tender
- Water tender, fire truck tanker
- Yacht tender
- A term for a light truck, e.g. the 1910s Crossley tender

== Other uses ==
- Legal tender, a form of money with a specific legal status
- Invitation to tender, a structured invitation to vendors for the supply of goods or services
- Procurement, a process of finding and agreeing to terms, and acquiring goods, services, or works from an external source, often via a tendering or competitive bidding process
- Tender offer, used to propose a buyout of a public company
- Tender (charity), London-based charity that works to prevent domestic and sexual violence
- Chicken tenders, a type of chicken dish
- Tender-mindedness, a personality trait related to agreeability

== See also ==
- Tenderness (disambiguation)
