= Arnolol =

Chemical compound

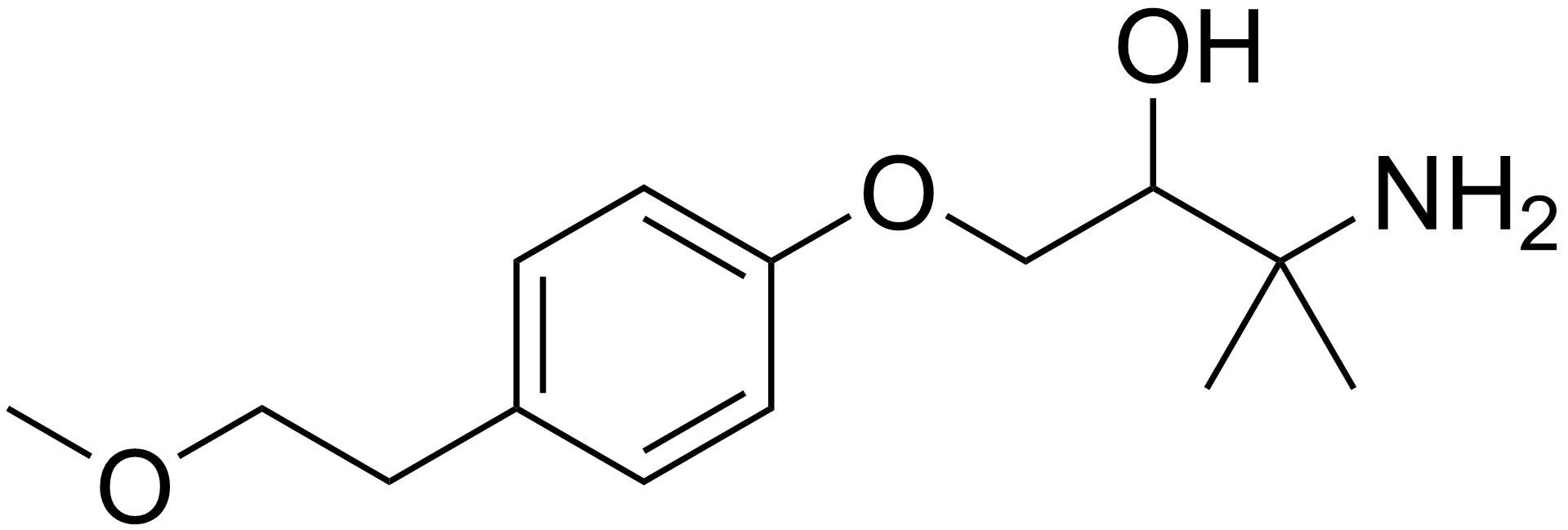

Clinical data
- ATC code: none

Identifiers
- IUPAC name: 3-amino-1-[4-(2-methoxyethyl)phenoxy]-3-methyl-butan-2-ol
- CAS Number: 87129-71-3
- PubChem CID: 65653
- ChemSpider: 59090
- UNII: 98HS077RUP
- ChEMBL: ChEMBL1742421
- CompTox Dashboard (EPA): DTXSID80868963

Chemical and physical data
- Formula: C_{14}H_{23}NO_{3}
- Molar mass: 253.342 g·mol^{−1}
- 3D model (JSmol): Interactive image
- SMILES: O(c1ccc(cc1)CCOC)CC(O)C(N)(C)C
- InChI: InChI=1S/C14H23NO3/c1-14(2,15)13(16)10-18-12-6-4-11(5-7-12)8-9-17-3/h4-7,13,16H,8-10,15H2,1-3H3; Key:LAWLHMWODZUZJH-UHFFFAOYSA-N

Arnolol is a beta blocker.
