= Hanscarl Leuner =

German psychiatrist (1919–1996)

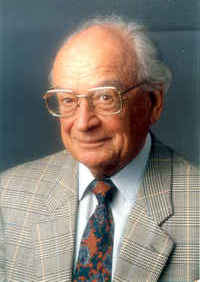
- Born: 8 January 1919; Bautzen, Germany
- Died: 22 June 1996 (aged 77); Göttingen, Germany
- Known for: Work on psychedelic-assisted therapy

Hanscarl Leuner (born 8 January 1919, Bautzen – 22 June 1996, Göttingen) was a German psychiatrist, psychotherapist, and researcher.

He is the founder of "Psycholytic Therapy" also known as Guided Affective Imagery ("Katathym-Imaginativen Psychotherapie" in German) and is recognised in Germany as a pioneer in the scientific, research and psychotherapeutic application of psychoactive substances in therapy, with the intent of analyzing the subconscious mind.

== Life ==
Leuner expressed interest in the profession of psychotherapy soon after graduating from high school in 1939. He pursued a medical degree between 1939 and 1946 in Frankfurt, Würzburg and Marburg Universities, with an interruption due to a period of military service during World War II. Following his studies, Leuner undertook a training analysis with Gustav Schmaltz in Frankfurt, and worked in the psychiatric clinic in Marburg from 1947.

At the request of Klaus Conrad, he moved to Göttingen in 1959. He obtained a Habilitation (post-doctoral qualification) there, with a thesis on model psychoses that he had completed in Marburg. Leuner then set up his own "Psychosomatics and Psychotherapy" department within the Psychiatric Clinic in Göttingen. In 1975, this entity became an independent department entitled "Department for Psychosomatic Medicine and Psychotherapy", Leuner remained head of this department until his retirement in 1985.

Despite suffering a heart attack in February 1996, he remained active until his death a few months later.

== Therapy Practices ==
During his time in Marburg in the late 1940s, Leuner began exploring the therapeutic potential of imagination inspired by Ernst Kretschmer's work. This approach was initially referred to as "Katathymes Bilderleben", and is now known as Katathym-Imaginative Psychotherapy. It involves utilizing the power of imagination to facilitate therapeutic processes with patients.

During the mid-1950s, Leuner started incorporating the use of hallucinogens to support his therapy. This method, known as psycholytic psychotherapy, involves the controlled and medical administration of psychoactive and psychedelic substances to enhance the psychotherapeutic process.

In 1960, Leuner organized the "First European Symposium for Psychotherapy under LSD 25" at the University of Göttingen. This event led to the establishment of the European Medical Society for Psycholytic Therapy (EPT) in 1964. However, due to increasing societal and political criticism of drug use, especially without proper medical oversight, many professionals withdrew from this research by the late 1960s. As a result, the EPT was dissolved after its fifth symposium in 1971.

In response, Leuner founded the Working Group for Catathymic Imagery and Imaginative Processes in Psychotherapy (AGKB) in 1974. In 1985, he established the European Collegium for Consciousness Studies (ECBS), and served as its president. The ECBS has organized multiple symposiums and three congresses titled "Worlds of Consciousness." The second congress in 1996, held in Heidelberg, was organized by Leuner himself.

== Bibliography (selected works) ==
- Die experimentelle Psychose. Ihre Psychopharmakologie, Phänomenologie und Dynamik in Beziehung zur Person. (Eng: The Experimental Psychoses: The psychopharmacology, phenomenology and dynamic in relation to the individual.) Springer, Berlin 1962, ISBN 978-3-540-02883-3. Reprint 1997: Berlin VWB.
- Katathymes Bilderleben: Unterstufe. Einführung in die Psychotherapie mit der Tagtraumtechnik. Ein Seminar. Thieme, Stuttgart 1970; 5. Auflage: Katathym-imaginative Psychotherapie (K.I.P.): „Katathymes Bilderleben“. Einführung in die Psychotherapie mit der Tagtraumtechnik. Ein Seminar. Thieme, Stuttgart 1994.
- Halluzinogene: Psychische Grenzzustände in Forschung und Psychotherapie. (Eng: "Hallucinogens: Psychiatric Limitations on Research and Psychotherapy") Huber, Bern 1981, ISBN 3-456-80933-6.
- Lehrbuch des Katathymen Bilderlebens. Huber, Bern 1985; 3. Auflage: Lehrbuch der Katathym-imaginativen Psychotherapie. Huber, Bern 1994, ISBN 3-456-82430-0.
- Ce qu’on n’a pas expliqué en France, Planète, n°33, mars-avril 1967, pp. 92–101
