= 2C-D =

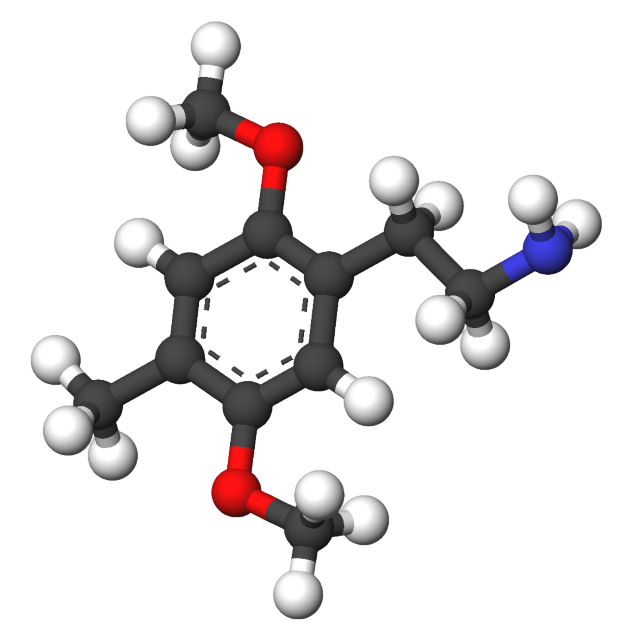

Clinical data
- Other names: 4-Methyl-2,5-dimethoxyphenethylamine; 2,5-Dimethoxy-4-methyl-phenethylamine; 2C-M; 2C-DOM; LE-25; LE25; DMMPEA; DMM-PEA
- Routes of administration: Oral
- Drug class: Serotonin 5-HT_{2} receptor agonist; Serotonin 5-HT_{2A} receptor agonist; Serotonergic psychedelic; Hallucinogen; Stimulant; Cognitive enhancer

Legal status
- Legal status: BR: Class F2 (Prohibited psychotropics); CA: Schedule III; DE: Anlage I (Authorized scientific use only); US: Schedule I

Pharmacokinetic data
- Onset of action: 20–30 minutes
- Duration of action: 4–6 hours

Identifiers
- IUPAC name: 2-(2,5-dimethoxy-4-methylphenyl)ethan-1-amine
- CAS Number: 24333-19-5
- PubChem CID: 135740
- ChemSpider: 119559
- UNII: 7J43GY6ONS
- ChEMBL: ChEMBL124049
- CompTox Dashboard (EPA): DTXSID10179074

Chemical and physical data
- Formula: C_{11}H_{17}NO_{2}
- Molar mass: 195.262 g·mol^{−1}
- 3D model (JSmol): Interactive image
- Melting point: 213 to 214 °C (415 to 417 °F) (hydrochloride)
- SMILES: O(c1cc(c(OC)cc1CCN)C)C
- InChI: InChI=1S/C11H17NO2/c1-8-6-11(14-3)9(4-5-12)7-10(8)13-2/h6-7H,4-5,12H2,1-3H3; Key:UNQQFDCVEMVQHM-UHFFFAOYSA-N

2C-D, also known as 4-methyl-2,5-dimethoxyphenethylamine, is a psychedelic drug of the phenethylamine and 2C families. It has an unusually wide and gradual dose range and at low doses produces claimed cognitive enhancer-like effects, mild stimulant effects, and mild perceptual effects, whereas at high doses, it produces robust psychedelic effects. The drug is taken orally.

It acts as an agonist of the serotonin 5-HT_{2} receptors, including of the serotonin 5-HT_{2A} receptor. The drug is structurally related to other psychedelic and related phenethylamines such as its higher homologues DOM and Ariadne (4C-D) and other 2C psychedelics like 2C-B and 2C-E.

2C-D was first described in the literature by Beng T. Ho and colleagues in 1970. Its properties and effects in humans were described by Alexander Shulgin and colleagues in 1975. The drug was extensively studied by Hanscarl Leuner under the names DMM-PEA and LE-25 in psychedelic-assisted psychotherapy in Germany in the 1970s and 1980s. It was also informally studied by Darrell Lemaire as a potential "smart drug" in the 1970s and 1980s. 2C-D was first encountered as a novel designer drug by 2005. It became a controlled substance in the United States in 2012.

== Use and effects ==
In his book PiHKAL (Phenethylamines I Have Known and Loved) and other publications, Alexander Shulgin lists 2C-D's dose range as 20 to 60 mg orally and its duration as 4 to 6 hours. He describes threshold effects as occurring at a dose of 6 mg orally and full intoxication occurring at doses of 10 to 15 mg orally. Higher doses of 75 to 200 mg orally have also been described and were well-tolerated. In addition, a wider recreational dose range of 3 to 100 mg or more has been described. The onset is said to be 20 to 30 minutes and peak effects occur after 1.5 to 2 hours. Casey Hardison has described 2C-D as having a very gentle dose–response curve with an unusually wide dose range.

The effects of 2C-D have been described. At low doses, it produces perceived cognitive enhancement, mild stimulant-like effects, emotional integration, euphoria, and mild psychedelic effects such as perceptual enhancement that are much lighter than those of conventional psychedelics. At high doses, it produces robust psychedelic effects. Shulgin referred to 2C-D as a "pharmacological tofu" because it didn't have especially pronounced effects on its own until very high doses were reached but could be combined with and extend or potentiate the effects of other psychedelics without coloring their experiences.

Hanscarl Leuner, working in Germany, explored the use of 2C-D under the code name LE-25 in psychedelic-assisted psychotherapy at doses of up to 150 to 200 mg orally. Low doses of 2C-D in the range of 5 to 10 mg orally have been explored as a "smart drug" by Darrell Lemaire.

== Interactions ==
2C-D is metabolized by the monoamine oxidase (MAO) enzymes MAO-A and MAO-B. Monoamine oxidase inhibitors (MAOIs) such as phenelzine, tranylcypromine, moclobemide, and selegiline may potentiate the effects of 2C-D. This may result in overdose and serious toxicity.

== Pharmacology ==
=== Pharmacodynamics ===
2C-D activities
Target	Affinity (K_{i}, nM)
5-HT_{1A}	440–1,630 (K_{i}) >10,000 (EC_{50}) <25% (E_{max})
5-HT_{1B}	ND
5-HT_{1D}	ND
5-HT_{1E}	ND
5-HT_{1F}	ND
5-HT_{2A}	23.9–32.4 (K_{i}); 16.4–8,130 (EC_{50}); 6–121% (E_{max})
5-HT_{2B}	ND (K_{i}); 230 (EC_{50}); 77% (E_{max})
5-HT_{2C}	12.7–150 (K_{i}); 71.1–18,600 (EC_{50}); 48–100% (E_{max})
5-HT_{3}	ND
5-HT_{4}	ND
5-HT_{5A}	ND
5-HT_{6}	ND
5-HT_{7}	ND
α_{1A}	12,000
α_{1B}, α_{1D}	ND
α_{2A}	290
α_{2B}, α_{2C}	ND
β_{1}–β_{3}	ND
D_{1}	24,000
D_{2}	7,100
D_{3}	>17,000
D_{4}	ND
D_{5}	ND
H_{1}	>25,000
H_{2}–H_{4}	ND
M_{1}–M_{5}	ND
I_{1}	ND
σ_{1}, σ_{2}	ND
TAAR1	3,500 (K_{i}) (mouse); 150 (K_{i}) (rat); 2,000 (EC_{50}) (mouse); 490 (EC_{50}) (rat) >10,000 (EC_{50}) (human); 61% (E_{max}) (mouse); 55% (E_{max}) (rat)
SERT	31,000 (K_{i}); 77,000 (IC_{50}); IA (EC_{50})
NET	>30,000 (K_{i}); 45,000 (IC_{50}); IA (EC_{50})
DAT	>30,000 (K_{i}); 626,000 (IC_{50}); IA (EC_{50})
MAO-A	ND (IC_{50})
MAO-B	24,000 (IC_{50})
Notes: The smaller the value, the more avidly the drug binds to the site. All proteins are human unless otherwise specified. Refs:

2C-D acts as a partial agonist of the serotonin 5-HT_{2A}, 5-HT_{2B}, and 5-HT_{2C} receptors.

== Chemistry ==
=== Synthesis ===
The chemical synthesis of 2C-D has been described.

=== Analogues ===
Analogues of 2C-D include 2C-B, 2C-E, 2C-P, other 2Cs, DOM (α-methyl-2C-D), Ariadne (4C-D; α-ethyl-2C-D), 5C-D (α-propyl-2C-D), and TWEETIOs like 2CD-5-ETO, among others. Other notable derivatives of 2C-D include 2C-G (3-methyl-2C-D) and other compounds of the 2C-G series like 2C-G-3 and 2C-G-5.

== History ==
2C-D was first described in the scientific literature by Beng T. Ho and colleagues at the Texas Research Institute of Mental Sciences in 1970. They described its synthesis and pharmacological effects in animals. The properties and effects of 2C-D in humans, along with those of 2C-B, were described by Alexander Shulgin and Michael Carter in 1975. Shulgin had first tested 2C-D at sub-threshold doses in 1964 and 1965. Subsequently, he tested it at higher doses in 1974 and 1975 and discovered its psychoactive effects.

Hanscarl Leuner and his student Michael Schlichting extensively studied 2C-D at high doses in psychedelic-assisted psychotherapy in Germany in the 1970s and 1980s. Darrell Lemaire, under the pseudonyms Hosteen Nez and/or Lazar, studied 2C-D at low doses as a potential "smart drug" in the 1970s and 1980s.

2C-D was encountered as a novel recreational designer drug in the United States by 2005. It was not a controlled substance in the United States or most other countries at this time, in contrast to more popular 2Cs like 2C-B and 2C-T-7. The drug became a Schedule I controlled substance in the United States in 2012.

== Society and culture ==
=== Legal status ===
==== Canada ====
As of October 31, 2016; 2C-D is a controlled substance (Schedule III) in Canada.

==== China ====
As of October 2015 2C-D is a controlled substance in China.

==== Denmark ====
2C-D is added to the list of Schedule B controlled substances.

==== Finland ====
Listed in the government decree on psychoactive substances banned from the consumer market.

==== Germany ====
2C-D is an Anlage I controlled drug.

==== Sweden ====
Sveriges riksdags health ministry Statens folkhälsoinstitut classified 2C-D as "health hazard" under the act Lagen om förbud mot vissa hälsofarliga varor (Act on the Prohibition of Certain Goods Dangerous to Health) as of Mar 1, 2005, in their regulation SFS 2005:26 listed as "2,5-dimetoxi-4-metylfenetylamin (2C-D)", making it illegal to sell or possess.

==== United States ====
2C-D became a Schedule I Controlled Substance in the United States as of July 9, 2012, with the signing of Food and Drug Administration Safety and Innovation Act. On a state level, both Oklahoma and Pennsylvania list 2C-D under schedule I.

== See also ==
- 2C (psychedelics)
- ASR-2001 (2CB-5PrO)
