= Toliprolol =

Names
- Preferred IUPAC name 1-(3-Methylphenoxy)-3-[(propan-2-yl)amino]propan-2-ol

Identifiers
CAS Number	2933-94-0
3D model (JSmol)	Interactive image
ChemSpider	17050
ECHA InfoCard	100.019.005
PubChem CID	18047
UNII	DCP58J201D
CompTox Dashboard (EPA)	DTXSID50863061
- InChI: InChI=1S/C13H21NO2/c1-10(2)14-8-12(15)9-16-13-6-4-5-11(3)7-13/h4-7,10,12,14-15H,8-9H2,1-3H3 Key: NXQMNKUGGYNLBY-UHFFFAOYSA-N
- SMILES: CC1=CC(=CC=C1)OCC(CNC(C)C)O

Properties
Chemical formula	C_{13}H_{21}NO_{2}
Molar mass	223.316 g·mol^{−1}
- Except where otherwise noted, data are given for materials in their standard state (at 25 °C [77 °F], 100 kPa). Infobox references

Toliprolol is a beta adrenergic receptor antagonist.
