= Thioescaline =

Thioescaline (TE) may refer to the following:

- 3-Thioescaline (3-TE)
- 4-Thioescaline (4-TE; thioescaline)

== See also ==
- Scaline
- Thiomescaline
- Thioproscaline
- Thiobuscaline
