= Shulgin Rating Scale =

Scale for reporting subjective effects of psychoactive substances

The Shulgin Rating Scale (or "quantitative potency scale") is a simple scale for reporting the subjective effect of psychoactive substances at a given dosage, and at a given time. The system was developed for research purposes by the American biochemist Alexander Shulgin, and published with co-authors Ann Shulgin and Peyton Jacob III, in a 1986 issue of the journal Methods and Findings in Experimental and Clinical Pharmacology. It was later described in the Shulgins' popular 1991 book PIHKAL: A Chemical Love Story.

== PIHKAL Glossary excerpts ==
- MINUS, n. (−) On the quantitative potency scale (−, ±, +, ++, +++), there were no effects observed.
- PLUS/MINUS, n. (±) The level of effectiveness of a drug that indicates a threshold action. If a higher dosage produces a greater response, then the plus/minus (±) was valid. If a higher dosage produces nothing, then this was a false positive.
- PLUS ONE, n. (+) The drug is quite certainly active. The chronology can be determined with some accuracy, but the nature of the drug's effects are not yet apparent.
- PLUS TWO, n. (++) Both the chronology and the nature of the action of a drug are unmistakably apparent. But you still have some choice as to whether you will accept the adventure, or rather just continue with your ordinary day's plans (if you are an experienced researcher, that is). The effects can be allowed a predominant role, or they may be repressible and made secondary to other chosen activities.
- PLUS THREE, n. (+++) Not only are the chronology and the nature of a drug's action quite clear, but ignoring its action is no longer an option. The subject is totally engaged in the experience, for better or worse.
- PLUS FOUR, n. (++++) A rare and precious transcendental state, which has been called a "peak experience," a "religious experience," "divine transformation," a "state of Samadhi" and many other names in other cultures. It is not connected to the +1, +2, and +3 of the measuring of a drug's intensity. It is a state of bliss, a participation mystique, a connectedness with both the interior and exterior universes, which has come about after the ingestion of a psychedelic drug, but which is not necessarily repeatable with a subsequent ingestion of that same drug. If a drug (or technique or process) were ever to be discovered which would consistently produce a plus four experience in all human beings, it is conceivable that it would signal the ultimate evolution, and perhaps the end, of the human experiment.

— Alexander Shulgin, PIHKAL, pages 963–965

== Usage ==
Shulgin Ratings typically include three components. An identification of the chemical being ingested, a dosage, and a descriptive narrative including the ratings themselves used to describe various moments in time. The chemical itself must be clearly identified, preferably using chemical nomenclature, as opposed to popular or "street" names. The dosage must be known and communicated, as substances may result in wildly different ratings at different doses. The rating itself gives a comparable value relating to the subjective intensity of the experience, including auditory, visual, emotional, mental, physical and other sensory effects. The narrative may include various Shulgin ratings, noting the time to achieve various levels, for instance:

(with 22 mg) A slow onset. It took an hour for a plus one, and almost another two hours to get to a +++. Very vivid fantasy images, eyes closed, but no blurring of lines between "reality" and fantasy. Some yellow-grey patterns à la psilocybin. Acute diarrhea at about the fourth hour but no other obvious physical problems. Erotic lovely. Good material for unknown number of possible uses. Can explore for a long time. Better try 20 milligrams next time.

— PIHKAL, page 560, in regards to the substance 2C-T-2

== Potential PLUS FOUR, n. (++++) candidate substance ==
5-MeO-DMT is a candidate entheogen substance for consistent plus four experience as it is known to bring one of— if not the highest— mystical subjective experience, comparable to the description of Samadhi.

== See also ==
- List of hallucinogen scales
