= Darrell Lemaire =

American researcher (1926-2019)

- A photo of Lemaire in 2015
- Born: August 28, 1926; Reno, Nevada
- Died: January 2019 (aged 92)
- Other names: Lazar; Hosteen Nez
- Occupation: Mining engineer
- Known for: Psychedelic drug research, development and research on 2C-D and TWEETIOs as "smart drugs"

Darrell Lemaire (August 28, 1926 – January 2019) was an American mining engineer and psychedelic drug chemist.

== Life and work ==
Lemaire was born in Reno, Nevada on August 28, 1926. He spent two years in the U.S. Navy (1944–46). He then earned a BSc in chemistry from the University of Nevada in 1953, followed by his master's in metallurgical engineering from Mackay School of Mines (1954).

While working at a Uranium processing plant in Arizona, working closely with Navajo natives, Lemaire discovered peyote, and became intensely interested in manufacturing and testing a variety of psychoactive substances. Lemaire used pseudonyms "Hosteen Nez" and "Lazar" in order to publish a pamphlet, ''Certain Exotic Transmitters as SMART PILLS'', on some of his findings regarding 2C-D. Lemaire also developed the TWEETIO series of psychedelics, including compounds such as 2CD-5EtO. Lemaire was the mentor of the psychedelic clandestine chemist Casey Hardison. Lemaire's work in the area of psychedelics was covered in the episode 'The Lazy Lizard School of Hedonism' by Hamilton Morris in his documentary TV series Hamilton's Pharmacopeia in 2016.

Lemaire has also done work involving the use of gumweed as a potential biofuel in conjunction with individuals at the University of Nevada.

He died from cancer in January 2019, at the age of 92.

== Publications ==
- Lemaire D, Jacob P, Shulgin AT (August 1985). "Ring-substituted beta-methoxyphenethylamines: a new class of psychotomimetic agents active in man". J Pharm Pharmacol. 37 (8): 575–577. doi:10.1111/j.2042-7158.1985.tb03072.x. PMID 2864422.
- Lazar (Darrell Lemaire); Hosteen Nez (1990), Certain Exotic Transmitters as Smart Pills or Compounds that Increase the Capacity for Mental Work in Humans: A Story About LAZAR as Told by Hosteen Nez (2 ed.), archived from the original (PDF) on 9 July 2001
- Hosteen Nez (Darrell Lemaire) (2010). "Notes About Psychoactive Compounds" (PDF). In Targ, Russell; Radin, Dean (eds.). Radiant Minds: Scientists Explore the Dimensions of Consciousness. Millay. pp. 201–207. ISBN 978-0-615-29633-3.
- Synthetic Methods Index (1986), a paper on the creation of novel psychedelic substances.
- Lazar (2001). "Short-Acting". The Entheogen Review. 10 (1): 20–23. ISSN 1066-1913. Archived from the original on 31 January 2001.
- Lazar (2002). "Some "High" Desert Plants". The Entheogen Review. 11 (1): 6–8. ISSN 1066-1913.

== See also ==
- List of psychedelic chemists
- 2C-D and TWEETIO (psychedelics)
