= Alkoxy group =

Chemical group (R–O)

Alkoxy groups

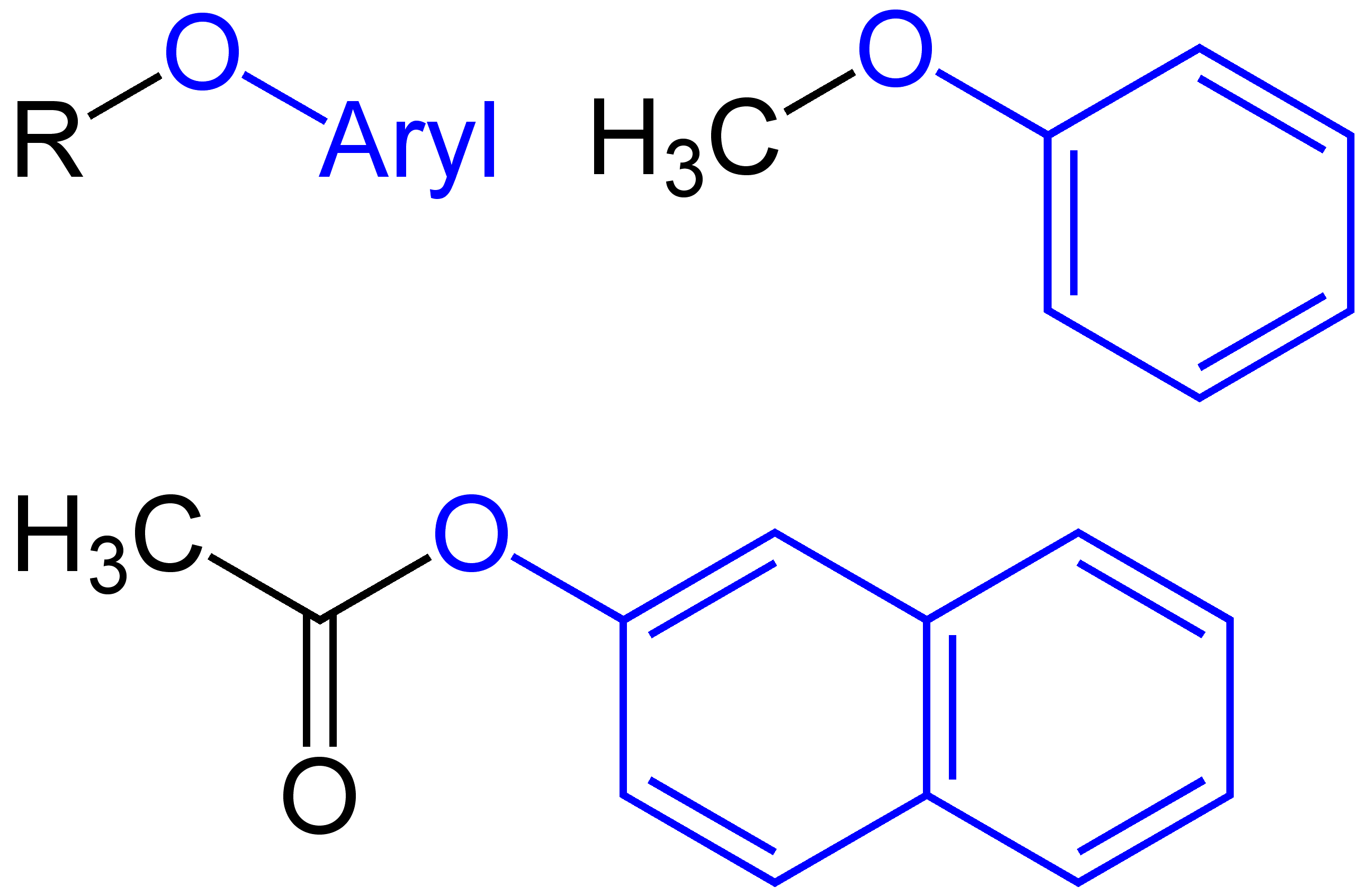
Aryloxy groups

In chemistry, the alkoxy group is an alkyl group which is singularly bonded to oxygen; thus R−O. Denoted usually with apostrophe ('). The range of alkoxy groups is vast, the simplest being methoxy (CH_{3}O−). An ethoxy group (CH_{3}CH_{2}O−) is found in the organic compound ethyl phenyl ether (C_{6}H_{5}OCH_{2}CH_{3}, also known as ethoxybenzene).

Related to alkoxy groups are aryloxy groups, which have an aryl group singularly bonded to oxygen such as the phenoxy group (C_{6}H_{5}O−).

An alkoxy or aryloxy group bonded to an alkyl or aryl (R−O−R') is an ether. If bonded to H it is an alcohol.

The term alkoxide refers to the anionic conjugate bases of alcohols (RO^{−}) or to ionic compounds containing such an anion. Alkoxide compounds are derivatives of alcohols where the hydrogen of the –OH group is replaced by a metal; for example, the sodium salt of ethanol (CH_{3}CH_{2}OH) is sodium ethoxide, containing ethoxide anions CH_{3}CH_{2}O^{−} and sodium cations Na^{+}. Alkoxides are strong bases and nucleophiles. For example, the pK_{a} of ethanol is 15.9. Certain alkoxy groups may be made less basic by factors like resonance stabilization or the presence of electron-withdrawing groups: for example, the pK_{a} of 4-nitrophenol is 7.15.
