= Methoxy group =

Chemical group (–OCH3)

The structure of a typical methoxy group

In organic chemistry, a methoxy group is the functional group consisting of a methyl group bound to oxygen. This alkoxy group has the formula R−O−CH_{3}.

On a benzene ring, the Hammett equation classifies a methoxy substituent at the para position as an electron-donating group, but as an electron-withdrawing group if at the meta position. At the ortho position, steric effects are likely to cause a significant alteration in the Hammett equation prediction, which otherwise follows the same trend as that of the para position.

== Occurrence ==
The simplest of methoxy compounds are methanol and dimethyl ether. Other methoxy ethers include anisole and vanillin. Many metal alkoxides contain methoxy groups, such as tetramethyl orthosilicate and titanium methoxide. Esters with a methoxy group can be referred to as methyl esters, and the —COOCH_{3} substituent is called a methoxycarbonyl.

=== Biosynthesis ===
In nature, methoxy groups are found on nucleosides subjected to 2′-O-methylation, for example, in variations of the 5′-cap structure known as cap-1 and cap-2. They are also common substituents in O-methylated flavonoids, whose formation is catalyzed by O-methyltransferases that act on phenols, such as catechol-O-methyl transferase (COMT). Many natural products in plants, such as lignins, are generated via catalysis by caffeoyl-CoA O-methyltransferase.

=== Methoxylation ===
Organic methoxides are often produced by methylation of alkoxides. Some aryl methoxides can be synthesized by metal-catalyzed methylation of phenols, or by methoxylation of aryl halides.
