= C15H25NO2 =

The molecular formula C_{15}H_{25}NO_{2} may refer to:

- Dihydroalprenolol
- 2,5-Dimethoxy-4-butylamphetamine
- 2,5-Dimethoxy-4-isobutylamphetamine
- 2,5-Dimethoxy-4-sec-butylamphetamine
- 2,5-Dimethoxy-4-tert-butylamphetamine
- Methylenedioxyphenylpropylaminopentane
- Nupharamine, an alkaloid found in Nuphar japonica
- Xibenolol
- 4C-P
