= 2,5-Dimethoxy-4-sec-butylamphetamine =

DOSB

Clinical data
- Other names: 2,5-Dimethoxy-4-sec-butylamphetamine; 4-sec-Butyl-2,5-dimethoxyamphetamine; DOSB; DOSBu; 2,5-Dimethoxy-4-(2-butyl)amphetamine; 1-(2,5-dimethoxy-4-(2-butyl)phenyl)-2-aminopropane; 1-DBPAP
- Routes of administration: Oral
- Drug class: Serotonin receptor agonist; Serotonergic psychedelic; Hallucinogen
- ATC code: None

Identifiers
- IUPAC name: 1-(4-butan-2-yl-2,5-dimethoxyphenyl)propan-2-amine
- CAS Number: 89556-71-8
- PubChem CID: 146057
- ChemSpider: 128843
- ChEMBL: ChEMBL332535
- CompTox Dashboard (EPA): DTXSID101008866

Chemical and physical data
- Formula: C_{15}H_{25}NO_{2}
- Molar mass: 251.370 g·mol^{−1}
- 3D model (JSmol): Interactive image
- SMILES: CCC(C)C1=C(C=C(C(=C1)OC)CC(C)N)OC
- InChI: InChI=1S/C15H25NO2/c1-6-10(2)13-9-14(17-4)12(7-11(3)16)8-15(13)18-5/h8-11H,6-7,16H2,1-5H3; Key:VEQUTPSVRQTUHR-UHFFFAOYSA-N

2,5-Dimethoxy-4-sec-butylamphetamine (DOSB or DOSBu), also known as 1-(2,5-dimethoxy-4-(2-butyl)phenyl)-2-aminopropane (1-DBPAP), is a serotonin receptor modulator of the phenethylamine, amphetamine, and DOx families.

== Use and effects ==
In humans, DOSB is active at doses of 25 to 30 mg orally. Similarly to DOBU, it is said that there is a "strong stimulation factor, with real and long-lasting sleep disturbance". In a subsequent publication however, Alexander Shulgin stated that DOSB was inactive at 25 mg orally. David E. Nichols also said that DOSB was inactive at up to 10 mg orally.

== Pharmacology ==
=== Pharmacodynamics ===
The affinity of DOSB for the rat serotonin 5-HT_{2} receptor was about 7.8 nM. For comparison, the affinities of LSD and DOM in the same study were 6.31 nM and 18.6 nM, respectively. DOSB substitutes for LSD in rodent drug discrimination tests, albeit much less potently than DOM (ED_{50} = 1.80 mg/kg versus 0.148 mg/kg, respectively; ~12-fold difference) and with only partial generalization (70% versus 99%, respectively). However, in a subsequent study, full generalization was obtained.

== Chemistry ==
=== Synthesis ===
The chemical synthesis of DOSB has been described.

=== Analogues ===
DOSB is part of the series of straight-chain and branched-chain 4-alkylated DOx drugs that also includes DOM, DOET, DOPR, DOBU, DOAM, and DOHx, among others.

Some other notable analogues of DOSB include DOBU (n-butyl), DOIB (iso-butyl), and DOTB (sec-butyl).

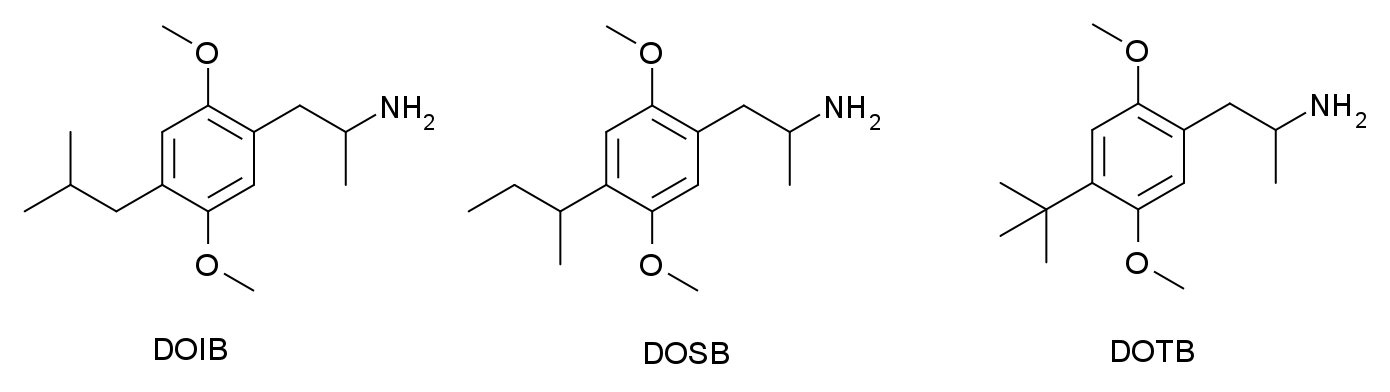
DOIB, DOSB, and DOTB.

== History ==
DOSB was first described in the scientific literature by David E. Nichols and colleagues by 1984.

== Society and culture ==
=== Legal status ===
==== Canada ====
DOSB is a controlled substance in Canada under phenethylamine blanket-ban language.

== See also ==
- DOx (psychedelics)
