= 2,5-Dimethoxy-4-isobutylamphetamine =

DOIB

Clinical data
- Other names: 2,5-Dimethoxy-4-isobutylamphetamine; 4-Isobutyl-2,5-dimethoxyamphetamine; DOIB; DOiBu; 2,5-Dimethoxy-4-(2-methylpropyl)amphetamine
- Routes of administration: Oral
- Drug class: Serotonin 5-HT_{2A} receptor agonist; Serotonergic psychedelic; Hallucinogen; Anti-inflammatory drug
- ATC code: None

Identifiers
- IUPAC name: 1-[2,5-dimethoxy-4-(2-methylpropyl)phenyl]propan-2-amine
- CAS Number: 89556-64-9
- PubChem CID: 44374984
- ChemSpider: 23231800
- ChEMBL: ChEMBL161299

Chemical and physical data
- Formula: C_{15}H_{25}NO_{2}
- Molar mass: 251.370 g·mol^{−1}
- 3D model (JSmol): Interactive image
- SMILES: CC(C)CC1=CC(=C(C=C1OC)CC(C)N)OC
- InChI: InChI=1S/C15H25NO2/c1-10(2)6-12-8-15(18-5)13(7-11(3)16)9-14(12)17-4/h8-11H,6-7,16H2,1-5H3; Key:ZLESHKOTWSWEGW-UHFFFAOYSA-N

2,5-Dimethoxy-4-isobutylamphetamine (DOIB or DOiBu) is a serotonin 5-HT_{2A} receptor agonist, serotonergic psychedelic, and anti-inflammatory drug of the phenethylamine, amphetamine, and DOx families.

== Use and effects ==
DOIB is active at doses of 10 to 15 mg orally, and hence is about one-third as potent as DOM.

== Pharmacology ==
=== Pharmacodynamics ===
DOIB is a full agonist of the serotonin 5-HT_{2A} receptor, with an EC_{50} of 12.6 nM and an E_{max} of 98.8%, both for calcium mobilization. It is about one-third as potent as DOM in rodent drug discrimination tests and also substitutes for LSD in these tests. In addition to its psychedelic effects, DOIB has highly potent anti-inflammatory effects in preclinical research. It was more potent than almost any other tested psychedelic. The drug was notably more potent than (R)-DOI, but was less potent than 2C-I (the most potent assessed compound).

== Chemistry ==
=== Synthesis ===
The chemical synthesis of DOIB has been described.

=== Analogues ===
DOIB is part of the series of straight-chain and branched-chain 4-alkylated DOx drugs that also includes DOM, DOET, DOPR, DOBU, DOAM, and DOHx, among others.

Some other notable analogues of DOIB include DOBU (n-butyl), DOSB (sec-butyl), and DOTB (tert-butyl).

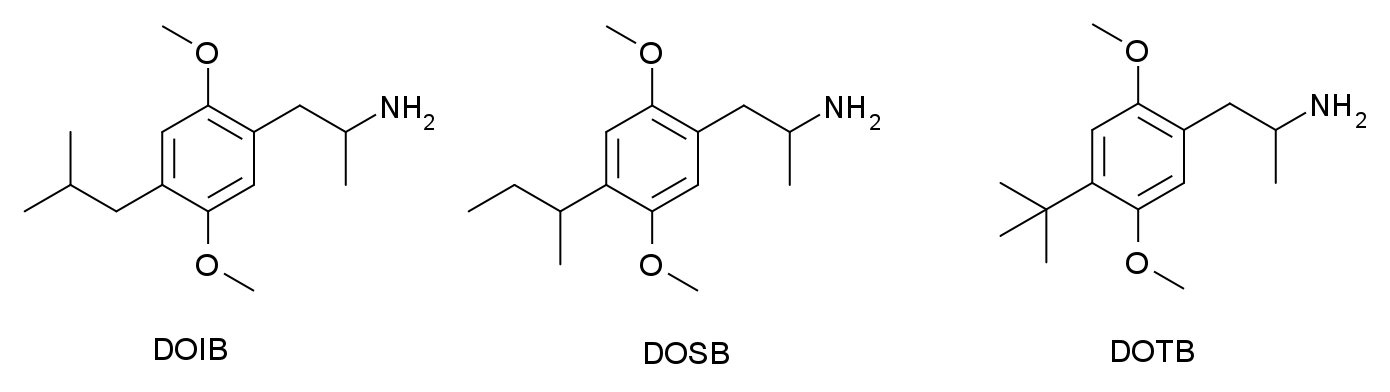
DOIB, DOSB, and DOTB.

== Society and culture ==
=== Legal status ===
==== Canada ====
DOIB is a controlled substance in Canada under phenethylamine blanket-ban language.

== See also ==
- DOx (psychedelics)
- 2C-iBu (ELE-02)
- 5-HT_{2A} receptor § Anti-inflammatory effects
