= 2C-Bu =

Clinical data
- Other names: 4-Butyl-2,5-dimethoxyphenethylamine; 2,5-Dimethoxy-4-butylphenethylamine; 2C-BU
- Drug class: Serotonin receptor modulator; Serotonin 5-HT_{2A} receptor agonist
- ATC code: None

Identifiers
- IUPAC name: 2-(4-butyl-2,5-dimethoxyphenyl)ethan-1-amine
- CAS Number: 2888537-44-6
- PubChem CID: 172187929

Chemical and physical data
- Formula: C_{14}H_{23}NO_{2}
- Molar mass: 237.343 g·mol^{−1}
- 3D model (JSmol): Interactive image
- SMILES: CCCCC1=CC(=C(C=C1OC)CCN)OC
- InChI: InChI=1S/C14H23NO2/c1-4-5-6-11-9-14(17-3)12(7-8-15)10-13(11)16-2/h9-10H,4-8,15H2,1-3H3; Key:WVGDKSDIKCPRKV-UHFFFAOYSA-N

2C-Bu, also known as 4-butyl-2,5-dimethoxyphenethylamine, is a serotonin receptor modulator of the phenethylamine and 2C families. It is the 2C analogue of the DOx derivative DOBU.

== Use and effects ==
2C-Bu was not included in Alexander Shulgin's book PiHKAL (Phenethylamines I Have Known and Loved) and its properties and effects in humans are unknown.

== Pharmacology ==
=== Pharmacodynamics ===
2C-Bu is a potent and high-efficacy serotonin 5-HT_{2A} receptor partial agonist, with an EC_{50} of 3.9 to 29 nM and an E_{max} of 71 to 93%.

== Chemistry ==
=== Analogues ===
2C-Bu follows 2C-D, 2C-E, and 2C-P in the homologous series of 4-alkylated 2C derivatives. Higher homologues of 2C-Bu including 2C-Am and 2C-Hx are also known and have been characterized.

2C-Bu has several notable skeletal isomers, including 2C-iBu, 2C-tBu, and 2C-sBu. 2C-iBu and 2C-tBu are both active and produce hallucinogen-type effects in animals and/or humans. This is in spite of 2C-tBu being predicted to be inactive and DOTB (the DOx analogue of 2C-tBu) being inactive as a hallucinogen in animals and humans. 2C-iBu may have reduced hallucinogenic potency than other 2C drugs and is being developed as a potential anti-inflammatory medication.

Chemical structures of 2C-Bu and its skeletal isomers
2C-Bu

2C-iBu

2C-sBu

2C-tBu

== History ==
2C-Bu was said by Daniel Trachsel and colleagues in 2013 to be completely unknown. Subsequently, the drug was characterized in 2025.

== Society and culture ==
=== Legal status ===
==== Canada ====
2C-Bu is a controlled substance in Canada under phenethylamine blanket-ban language.

== See also ==
- 2C (psychedelics)
- 2C-CP
- 2C-CPE
