= 2,5-Dimethoxy-4-tert-butylamphetamine =

DOTB

Clinical data
- Other names: 2,5-Dimethoxy-4-tert-butylamphetamine; DOTB; DOtBu; 4-tert-Butyl-2,5-dimethoxyamphetamine
- Routes of administration: Oral
- Drug class: Serotonin receptor modulator; Serotonin 5-HT_{2A}, 5-HT_{2B}, and 5-HT_{2C} receptor modulator
- ATC code: None

Identifiers
- IUPAC name: 1-(4-tert-butyl-2,5-dimethoxyphenyl)propan-2-amine
- CAS Number: 42456-77-9
- PubChem CID: 12262514
- ChemSpider: 10440072
- ChEMBL: ChEMBL8317
- CompTox Dashboard (EPA): DTXSID10874754

Chemical and physical data
- Formula: C_{15}H_{25}NO_{2}
- Molar mass: 251.370 g·mol^{−1}
- 3D model (JSmol): Interactive image
- SMILES: CC(CC1=CC(=C(C=C1OC)C(C)(C)C)OC)N
- InChI: InChI=1S/C15H25NO2/c1-10(16)7-11-8-14(18-6)12(15(2,3)4)9-13(11)17-5/h8-10H,7,16H2,1-6H3; Key:RUAUPNFNQOGIFF-UHFFFAOYSA-N

2,5-Dimethoxy-4-tert-butylamphetamine (DOTB or DOtBu) is a non-hallucinogenic serotonin receptor modulator of the phenethylamine, amphetamine, and DOx families.

== Use and effects ==
According to Alexander Shulgin and colleagues, DOTB has been found to be inactive in humans at doses of up to 25 mg orally.

== Pharmacology ==
=== Pharmacodynamics ===
DOTB binds with high affinity to the serotonin 5-HT_{2} receptors, including to the serotonin 5-HT_{2A} and 5-HT_{2C} receptors and, to about a 10-fold lesser extent, to the serotonin 5-HT_{2B} receptor. It has been found to act as a partial agonist of the serotonin 5-HT_{2A} receptor, with an intrinsic efficacy of about 30% for phosphatidylinositol hydrolysis and about half of the efficacy of (R)-DOB. DOTB has also been assessed and found to act as a partial agonist of the serotonin 5-HT_{2B} receptor (E_{max} = 69%).

The drug appeared to be inactive in animals in the conditioned avoidance test in rodents. DOTB only partially substituted for DOM in rodent drug discrimination tests (up to 70% responding, followed by disruption at higher doses) and with much lower potency than other DOx drugs. In combination with DOM, DOTB produced some antagonism of the stimulus generalization of DOM, suggesting action as a lower-efficacy partial agonist of the serotonin 5-HT_{2A} receptor. Unlike DOM but similarly to DOAM, DOTB did not substitute for 5-MeO-DMT in rodent drug discrimination tests. It also did not affect locomotor activity in rodents, again in contrast to other DOx drugs, though there were non-significant increases in locomotion at the highest assessed doses. It did still produce hyperthermia in rabbits similarly to other DOx drugs, albeit with dramatically reduced potency.

== Chemistry ==
=== Synthesis ===
The chemical synthesis of DOTB has been described.

=== Analogues ===
DOTB is part of the series of straight-chain and branched-chain 4-alkylated DOx drugs that also includes DOM, DOET, DOPR, DOBU, DOAM, and DOHx, among others.

Some other notable analogues of DOTB include DOBU (n-butyl), DOIB (iso-butyl), and DOSB (sec-butyl).

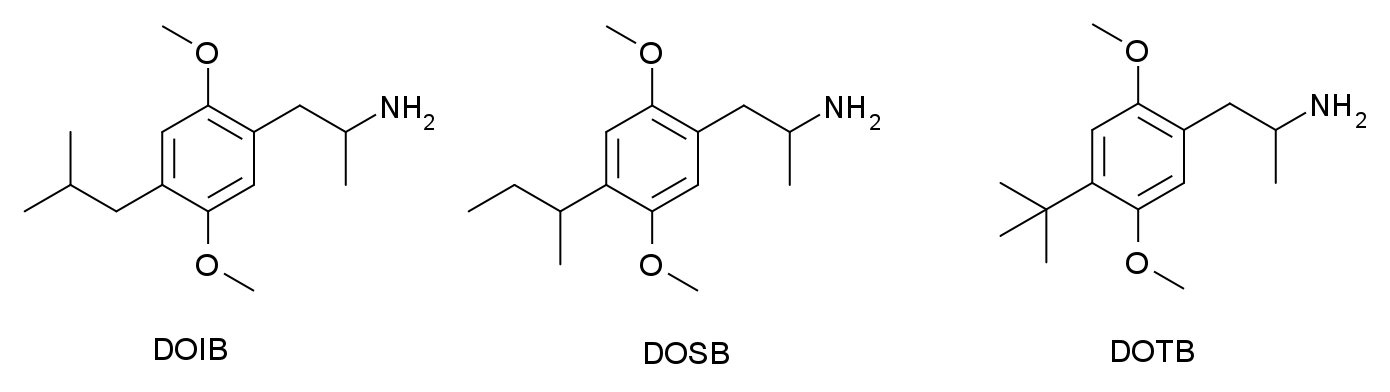
DOIB, DOSB, and DOTB.

== History ==
DOTB was first described in the scientific literature in 1974. Its psychoactive effects were first assessed and described by Alexander Shulgin in 1975.

== Society and culture ==
=== Legal status ===
==== Canada ====
DOTB is a controlled substance in Canada under phenethylamine blanket-ban language.

== See also ==
- DOx (psychedelics)
- 2C-tBu
