= 2,5-Dimethoxy-4-isopropylamphetamine =

Psychedelic drug

DOiP

Clinical data
- Other names: DOIP; DOiP; DOiPr; 2,5-Dimethoxy-4-isopropylamphetamine; 4-Isopropyl-2,5-dimethoxyamphetamine
- Routes of administration: Oral
- Drug class: Serotonergic psychedelic; Hallucinogen

Legal status
- Legal status: CA: Schedule I; DE: NpSG (Industrial and scientific use only); UK: Class A

Pharmacokinetic data
- Duration of action: Unknown

Identifiers
- IUPAC name: 1-[2,5-Dimethoxy-(propan-2-yl)phenyl]propan-2-amine
- CAS Number: 42306-96-7 53581-56-9 (hydrochloride salt)
- PubChem CID: 44265275
- ChemSpider: 23108724
- UNII: PF0P8RBU0X
- CompTox Dashboard (EPA): DTXSID901032534

Chemical and physical data
- Formula: C_{14}H_{23}NO_{2}
- Molar mass: 237.343 g·mol^{−1}
- 3D model (JSmol): Interactive image
- SMILES: COC1=C(C=C(C(=C1)C(C)C)OC)CC(C)N
- InChI: InChI=1S/C14H23NO2/c1-9(2)12-8-13(16-4)11(6-10(3)15)7-14(12)17-5/h7-10H,6,15H2,1-5H3; Key:UEEAUFJYLUJWQJ-UHFFFAOYAM

DOiP, or DOiPr, also known as 2,5-dimethoxy-4-isopropylamphetamine, is a psychedelic drug of the phenethylamine, amphetamine, and DOx families.

== Use and effects ==
In his book PiHKAL (Phenethylamines I Have Known and Loved), Alexander Shulgin describes DOiP as being at least an order of magnitude less potent than DOPR, with doses of 20 to 30 mg orally required to produce clear changes in mental state. The specific effects of DOiP have not been described.

== Pharmacology ==
=== Pharmacodynamics ===
The receptor interactions of DOiP have been studied.

DOiP substitutes for DOM in rodent drug discrimination tests, but it is several-fold less potent than other DOx drugs like DOM, DOET, and DOPR, though it is similar in potency to DOBU.

== Chemistry ==
=== Synthesis ===
The chemical synthesis of DOiP has been described.

=== Analogues ===
Analogues of DOiP include DOM, DOET, DOPR, DOBU, DOiB, and 2C-iP, among others.

== History ==
DOiP was first described in the scientific literature by F. Aldous and colleagues in 1974. It was not included as an entry and was only briefly mentioned in Alexander Shulgin's 1991 book PiHKAL (Phenethylamines I Have Known and Loved). However, DOiP was subsequently included as an entry in Shulgin's 2011 book The Shulgin Index, Volume One: Psychedelic Phenethylamines and Related Compounds.

== Society and culture ==
=== Legal status ===
DOiP is a controlled substance in Canada under phenethylamine blanket-ban language.

== See also ==
- DOx (psychedelics)
