= 2C-CPe =

Clinical data
- Other names: 2C-CPE; 4-Cyclopentyl-2,5-dimethoxyphenethylamine; 2,5-Dimethoxy-4-cyclopentylphenethylamine

Identifiers
- IUPAC name: 2-(4-cyclopentyl-2,5-dimethoxyphenyl)ethanamine
- PubChem CID: 169149436

Chemical and physical data
- Formula: C_{15}H_{23}NO_{2}
- Molar mass: 249.354 g·mol^{−1}
- 3D model (JSmol): Interactive image
- SMILES: COC1=CC(=C(C=C1CCN)OC)C2CCCC2
- InChI: InChI=1S/C15H23NO2/c1-17-14-10-13(11-5-3-4-6-11)15(18-2)9-12(14)7-8-16/h9-11H,3-8,16H2,1-2H3; Key:GIYHLPFOZWFVHO-UHFFFAOYSA-N

2C-CPe, also known as 4-cyclopentyl-2,5-dimethoxyphenethylamine, is a designer drug from the substituted phenethylamine family, which was first synthesised by Josh Hartsel and colleagues in 2024. It is a moderately potent agonist at the serotonin receptor 5-HT_{2A} in vitro, with a binding affinity (K_{i}) of 134 nM, slightly weaker than the related cyclopropyl compound 2C-CP. It is not known to have been tested in humans or animals. It is a controlled substance in Canada under phenethylamine blanket-ban language.

== See also ==
- 2C (psychedelics)
- 2C-P
- 2C-Bu
- 2C-iBu
