= 2C-iP =

Chemical compound

Clinical data
- Other names: 4-Isopropyl-2,5-dimethoxyphenethylamine; 2,5-Dimethoxy-4-isopropylphenethylamine; Jelena; Momento
- Routes of administration: Oral
- Drug class: Serotonin receptor modulator; Serotonergic psychedelic; Hallucinogen
- ATC code: None

Legal status
- Legal status: DE: NpSG (Industrial and scientific use only); UK: Class A

Pharmacokinetic data
- Duration of action: 8–12 hours

Identifiers
- IUPAC name: 2-[2,5-dimethoxy-4-(propan-2-yl)phenyl]ethan-1-amine
- CAS Number: 1498978-47-4
- PubChem CID: 57474311
- ChemSpider: 27750188
- UNII: 4TT057Y1ST
- CompTox Dashboard (EPA): DTXSID301032631

Chemical and physical data
- Formula: C_{13}H_{21}NO_{2}
- Molar mass: 223.316 g·mol^{−1}
- 3D model (JSmol): Interactive image
- SMILES: COC1=C(C=C(C(=C1)C(C)C)OC)CCN
- InChI: InChI=1S/C13H21NO2/c1-9(2)11-8-12(15-3)10(5-6-14)7-13(11)16-4/h7-9H,5-6,14H2,1-4H3; Key:XUGPCRRUMVWELT-UHFFFAOYSA-N

2C-iP, also known as 4-isopropyl-2,5-dimethoxyphenethylamine or as Jelena or Momento, is a psychedelic drug of the phenethylamine and 2C families. It is taken orally. The drug was first described by 2011 and was encountered as a novel designer drug by 2018.

== Use and effects ==
2C-iP's dose is 8 to 25 mg orally and its duration is 8 to 12 hours. It is said that careful dose titration is necessary to avoid overdose. The drug is said to produce a strong sense of heightened awareness of the present moment, resulting in the nickname "Momento", among other effects.

== Pharmacology ==
=== Pharmacodynamics ===
2C-iP shows affinity for the serotonin 5-HT_{2} receptors, including for the serotonin 5-HT_{2A} receptor.

== Chemistry ==
=== Analogues ===
Analogues of 2C-iP include 2C-P, 2C-cP, 2C-iBu, 2C-tBu, 2C-D, 2C-E, 2C-T-4, and DOiP, among others.

== History ==
2C-iP was first described in the scientific literature by Dmitri Ger and colleagues by 2011. It was encountered as a novel designer drug in Sweden in 2018.

== Society and culture ==
=== Legal status ===
==== Canada ====
As of October 31, 2016, 2C-iP is a controlled substance (Schedule III) in Canada.

==== United States ====
2C-iP is not an explicitly controlled substance in the United States. However, it could be considered a controlled substance under the Federal Analogue Act if intended for human consumption. In addition, it may be considered scheduled as an isomer of 2C-P.

== See also ==
- 2C (psychedelics)
