= Charmian (drug) =

Clinical data
- Other names: CHARMIAN; α-Methyl-DOM; α-Me-DOM; BL-4041A; BL4041A; α,α,4-Trimethyl-2,5-dimethoxyphenethylamine; Phentermine-DOM
- Drug class: Serotonin receptor modulator
- ATC code: None

Identifiers
- IUPAC name: 1-(2,5-dimethoxy-4-methylphenyl)-2-methylpropan-2-amine
- PubChem CID: 53717326
- ChemSpider: 26711093

Chemical and physical data
- Formula: C_{13}H_{21}NO_{2}
- Molar mass: 223.316 g·mol^{−1}
- 3D model (JSmol): Interactive image
- SMILES: CC1=CC(=C(C=C1OC)CC(C)(C)N)OC
- InChI: InChI=1S/C13H21NO2/c1-9-6-12(16-5)10(7-11(9)15-4)8-13(2,3)14/h6-7H,8,14H2,1-5H3; Key:CETRTEFIJATLFR-UHFFFAOYSA-N

Charmian, also known as α-methyl-DOM, α,α,4-trimethyl-2,5-dimethoxyphenethylamine, or BL-4041A, is a serotonin receptor modulator of the phenethylamine, amphetamine, phentermine, and DOx families related to DOM. It is the α-methyl derivative of DOM or the 4-methyl-2,5-dimethoxy derivative of phentermine. According to Alexander Shulgin in his book PiHKAL (Phenethylamines I Have Known and Loved), Charmian was synthesized and studied and was found to be of greatly reduced affinity for serotonin receptors and potency in animals compared to DOM. It is not known to have been tested in humans. The drug is one of Shulgin's "ten classic ladies", a series of methylated DOM derivatives. The chemical synthesis of Charmian has been described. Charmian was first described in the scientific literature by C. F. Barfknecht and colleagues in 1978. The drug is not an explicitly controlled substance in the United States, but may be considered scheduled as an isomer of DOET.

== See also ==
- DOx (psychedelics)
- MDPH (α-methyl-MDA)
