= 2C-iBu =

Clinical data
- Other names: 4-Isobutyl-2,5-dimethoxyphenethylamine; 2,5-Dimethoxy-4-isobutylphenethylamine; 2C-iBu; 2C-IB; ELE-02; ELE02; ELEU02
- Routes of administration: Oral, ophthalmic
- Drug class: Serotonin 5-HT_{2A} receptor agonist; Serotonergic psychedelic; Hallucinogen; Anti-inflammatory drug

Pharmacokinetic data
- Protein binding: 74%
- Duration of action: 20 hours

Identifiers
- IUPAC name: 2-[2,5-dimethoxy-4-(2-methylpropyl)phenyl]ethanamine
- PubChem CID: 57486931

Chemical and physical data
- Formula: C_{14}H_{23}NO_{2}
- Molar mass: 237.343 g·mol^{−1}
- 3D model (JSmol): Interactive image
- SMILES: CC(C)CC1=C(C=C(C(=C1)OC)CCN)OC
- InChI: InChI=1S/C14H23NO2/c1-10(2)7-12-9-13(16-3)11(5-6-15)8-14(12)17-4/h8-10H,5-7,15H2,1-4H3; Key:FLBABUVVTQBINW-UHFFFAOYSA-N

2C-iBu, or 2C-IB, also known as 4-isobutyl-2,5-dimethoxyphenethylamine or by its developmental code name ELE-02, is a serotonin 5-HT_{2A} receptor agonist, serotonergic psychedelic, and anti-inflammatory drug which is under development for the treatment of inflammation. It is a member of the phenethylamine and 2C families of compounds. The drug is being developed as a topical eye drop for treatment of inflammatory eye conditions. There is also interest in 2C-iBu and related drugs for treatment of systemic inflammation and neuroinflammation.

== Use and effects ==
2C-iBu was not assessed or discovered by Alexander Shulgin and was not described in his 1991 book PiHKAL (Phenethylamines I Have Known and Loved). However, he did include 2C-iBu (as "2C-IB") as a DOM analogue in a table in his 2011 book The Shulgin Index, Volume One: Psychedelic Phenethylamines and Related Compounds. In addition, Shulgin stated in a footnote that a 5 mg oral dose of 2C-iBu produces threshold activity and has a long duration of about 20 hours. The cited source for these observations was a 2006 personal communication with M. Mueller.

== Pharmacology ==
=== Pharmacodynamics ===
2C-iBu activities
Target	Affinity (K_{i}, nM)	
Target	2C-iBu	(R)-DOI
5-HT_{1A}	79	1,300
5-HT_{1B}	50	2,500
5-HT_{1D}	63	ND
5-HT_{2A}	1.3	0.040
5-HT_{2B}	16	2.5
5-HT_{2C}	0.25	0.63
5-HT_{6}	1,300	ND
5-HT_{7}	320	ND
Notes: The smaller the value, the more avidly the drug interacts with the site. All proteins are human unless otherwise specified. Refs:

2C-iBu is a highly potent and robustly efficacious serotonin 5-HT_{2A} receptor agonist. Its EC_{50} values are 1.3 nM for calcium mobilization and 57.5 nM for β-arrestin-2 recruitment, whereas its E_{max} values are 103% for calcium mobilization and 77% for β-arrestin-2 recruitment relative to serotonin. The drug showed higher potency and efficacy as a serotonin 5-HT_{2A} receptor agonist than several other 2C drugs, including 2C-NP, 2C-B, 2C-I, 2C-H, and 2C-iP, whereas its activities were more comparable to or less than those of the DOx drugs DOIB, (R)-DOB, (R)-DOI, and DOiP. 2C-iBu has also been assessed and found to bind to other serotonin receptors, including the serotonin 5-HT_{2C}, 5-HT_{2B}, 5-HT_{1B}, 5-HT_{1D}, 5-HT_{1A}, 5-HT_{7}, and 5-HT_{6} receptors, in that order of affinity and with varying avidities.

2C-iBu dose-dependently produces the head-twitch response (HTR), a behavioral proxy of psychedelic effects, in rodents. In terms of ED_{50}, 2C-iBu is about 3-fold less potent than (R)-DOI in producing the HTR. According to Eleusis, it is expected to have "greatly reduced" psychoactivity or hallucinogenic effects compared to related drugs like other members of the 2C family.

The drug is effective in an allergic asthma model in rodents and showed similar potency as (R)-DOI. Due to its reduced potency in producing the HTR but retained anti-inflammatory potency, 2C-iBu is expected to show greater separation between the desired anti-inflammatory and the undesired psychedelic effects in humans compared to (R)-DOI. In contrast to certain other anti-inflammatory drugs like corticosteroids, serotonin 5-HT_{2A} receptor agonists like 2C-iBu are not immunosuppressants.

== Chemistry ==
2C-iBu, also known as 4-isobutyl-2,5-dimethoxyphenethylamine, is a phenethylamine and 2C derivative.

=== Synthesis ===
The chemical synthesis of 2C-iBu has been described.

=== Analogues ===
Related drugs to 2C-iBu include 2C-Bu (the butyl analogue), 2C-tBu (the tert-butyl analogue), 2C-sBu (the sec-butyl analogue), and 2C-CPM (the cyclopropylmethyl analogue). In addition, 2C-iBu is related to DOx drugs such as DOIB (DOiBu).

According to Charles D. Nichols, 2,5-dimethoxyamphetamine (2,5-DMA) has potent anti-inflammatory activity with weak or no hallucinogenic effects. Moreover, DOTFM has potent psychedelic effects with no anti-inflammatory activity. Hence, it appears that the anti-inflammatory effects and psychedelic effects of serotonin 5-HT_{2A} receptor agonists can be fully dissociated.

== History ==
2C-iBu was briefly described by Alexander Shulgin in his 2011 book The Shulgin Index, Volume One: Psychedelic Phenethylamines and Related Compounds. It was subsequently more thoroughly characterized by Charles D. Nichols and colleagues at Louisiana State University School of Medicine as a novel anti-inflammatory drug in the late 2010s. Eleusis has licensed 2C-iBu intellectual property from LSU and the drug has reached the preclinical research stage of development, but no recent development has been reported as of October 2023.

== Society and culture ==
=== Legal status ===
==== Canada ====
2C-iBu is a controlled substance in Canada under phenethylamine blanket-ban language.

==== United States ====
2C-iBu is not a controlled substance in the United States.

== Research ==
2C-iBu was developed as a novel anti-inflammatory drug by Charles D. Nichols and colleagues at Eleusis in the late 2010s. They are developing it for treatment of inflammatory conditions. Eleusis was acquired by and merged into Beckley Psytech in October 2022. The drug has reached the preclinical research stage of development, but no recent development has been reported as of October 2023. Eleusis has licensed intellectual property surrounding 2C-iBu and has patent protection for 2C-iBu.

== See also ==
- 2C (psychedelics)
- 5-HT_{2A} receptor § Anti-inflammatory effects
- List of investigational hallucinogens and entactogens
