= 2,5-Dimethoxy-4-methylamphetamine =

DOM

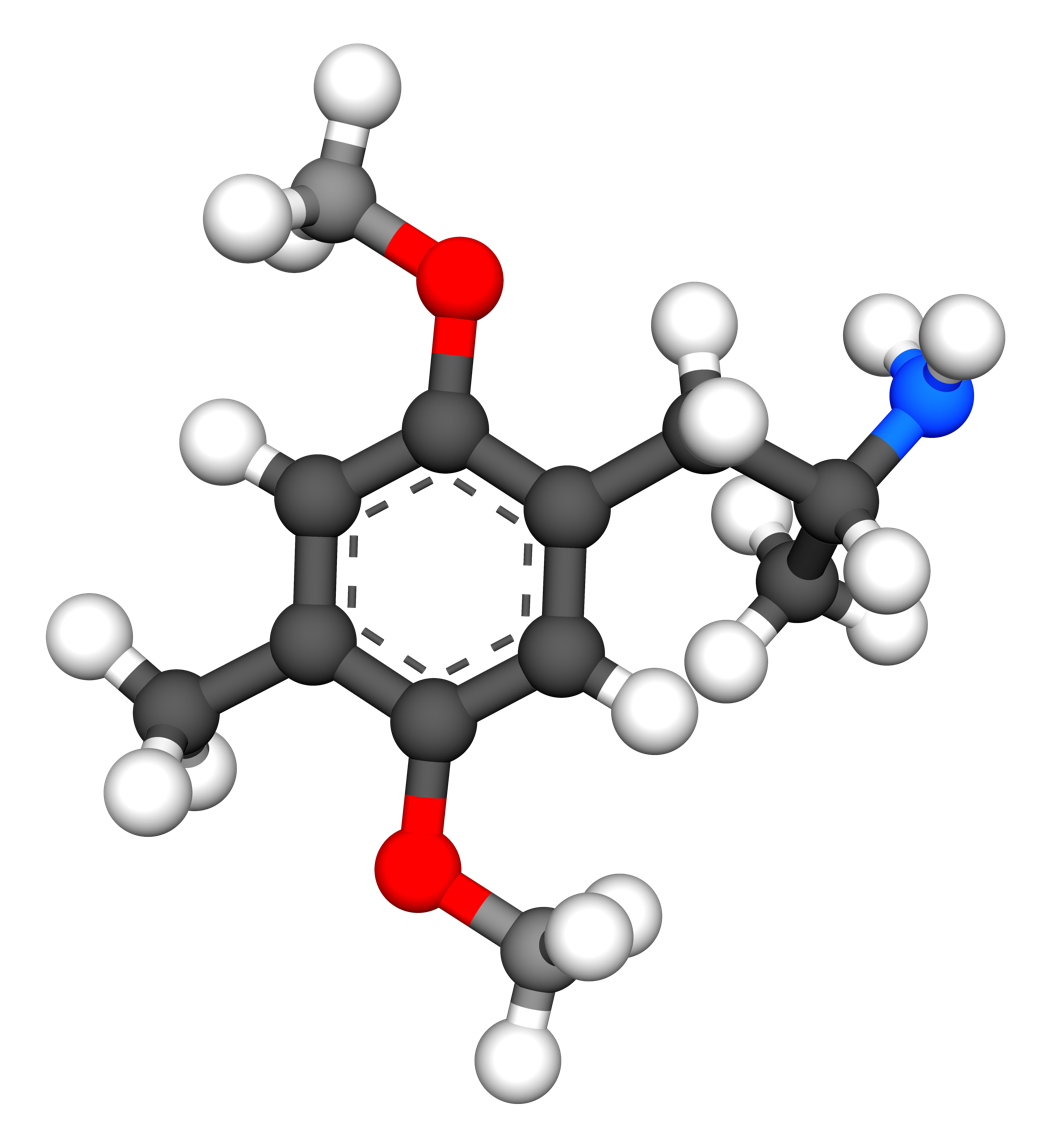

Clinical data
- Other names: 2,5-Dimethoxy-4-methylamphetamine; 4-Methyl-2,5-dimethoxyamphetamine; 2,5-Dimethoxy-4-methyl-α-methylphenethylamine; Des-oxy-methyl; DOM; DMMTA; α-Me-2C-D; STP; Serenity, Tranquility, and Peace; Super Terrific Psychedelic; Stop The Police; Too Stupid to Puke; K-61,082
- Routes of administration: Oral
- Drug class: Serotonin 5-HT_{2} receptor agonist; Serotonin 5-HT_{2A} receptor agonist; Serotonergic psychedelic; Hallucinogen; Stimulant; Antidepressant; Psychic energizer
- ATC code: None

Legal status
- Legal status: AU: S9 (Prohibited substance); BR: Class F2 (Prohibited psychotropics); CA: Schedule I; UK: Class A; US: Schedule I

Pharmacokinetic data
- Metabolism: Demethylation
- Metabolites: • 2-DM-DOM • 5-DM-DOM • 2,5-DDM-DOM
- Onset of action: 0.5–1.5 hours Peak: 2–6 hours
- Duration of action: Low doses: 5–8 hours Moderate doses: 8–24 hours High doses: possibly up to 3–4 days
- Excretion: 5–20% unchanged

Identifiers
- IUPAC name: 1-(2,5-dimethoxy-4-methylphenyl)propan-2-amine
- CAS Number: 15588-95-1 43061-13-8 ((R)-DOM) 43061-14-9 ((S)-DOM)
- PubChem CID: 85875
- DrugBank: DB01528
- ChemSpider: 77462
- UNII: UKI9MLD5OI
- KEGG: C22736
- ChEMBL: ChEMBL8600
- CompTox Dashboard (EPA): DTXSID50860611

Chemical and physical data
- Formula: C_{12}H_{19}NO_{2}
- Molar mass: 209.289 g·mol^{−1}
- 3D model (JSmol): Interactive image
- Melting point: 61 °C (142 °F)
- SMILES: CC1=CC(=C(C=C1OC)CC(C)N)OC
- InChI: InChI=1S/C12H19NO2/c1-8-5-12(15-4)10(6-9(2)13)7-11(8)14-3/h5,7,9H,6,13H2,1-4H3; Key:NTJQREUGJKIARY-UHFFFAOYSA-N

2,5-Dimethoxy-4-methylamphetamine (DOM), also known as STP (standing for "Serenity, Tranquility, and Peace" and other phrases), is a psychedelic drug of the phenethylamine, amphetamine, and DOx families. It has stimulant and antidepressant-like effects at low doses and hallucinogenic effects at higher doses. The drug can have a very slow onset and long duration, with its duration possibly being up to a few days at high doses. It is usually taken orally.

Side effects of DOM include amphetamine-like effects, among others. The drug acts as a serotonin 5-HT_{2} receptor agonist, including of the serotonin 5-HT_{2A} receptor. Analogues of DOM include mescaline, 2C-D, DOET, DOB, DOI, and Ariadne (4C-D), among others.

DOM was first synthesized and tested by Alexander Shulgin in 1963 and was later further described in his 1991 book PiHKAL (Phenethylamines I Have Known and Loved). The drug caused a small public health crisis in San Francisco in 1967 when it was introduced as a substitute for LSD, which was due to the tablets containing high doses and causing intense and very long-lived effects. DOM is classified as a Schedule I controlled substance in the United States, and is similarly controlled in other parts of the world. Internationally, it is a Schedule I drug under the Convention on Psychotropic Substances.

== Use and effects ==
In his book PiHKAL (Phenethylamines I Have Known and Loved) and other publications, Alexander Shulgin lists DOM's dose as 3 to 10 mg orally and its duration as 14 to 24 hours. An estimated typical dose is about 6 mg. The (R)-enantiomer, (R)-DOM, was active at a dose of 0.5 mg, whereas DOM itself produces threshold effects only at 1 mg. The (S)-enantiomer, (S)-DOM, showed no psychoactive effects at doses of up to 2.6 mg. As such, the activity of DOM appears to reside in (R)-DOM, with this enantiomer appearing to be roughly twice as potent as racemic DOM. In a review by Richard Glennon and colleagues, the approximate hallucinogenic dose was listed as 2 to 5 mg for racemic DOM, 1.0 to 2.5 mg for (R)-DOM, and greater than 4 mg for (S)-DOM, with no known active level of the latter enantiomer. DOM is said by Shulgin to have a slow build-up, with an onset of 30 to 60 minutes and a peak of 2 to 6 hours. It may also have a very long duration of up to 3 or 4 days when taken in excessively high doses such as 14 to 30 mg. However, it is unclear the extent to which this is actually true or may just be exaggeration. DOM is about 50- to 150-fold as potent as mescaline and around 30- to 60-fold less potent than LSD.

The effects of DOM were reported by Shulgin to include feeling strange, color enhancement, closed-eye imagery, visuals, introspection and insights, fantasy, depersonalization, music and erotic enhancement, time dilation, emotional changes, mood elevation, increased empathy, stimulation, mood swings, tension, discomfort, feeling overwhelmed or like one is losing control, impairment, pupil dilation, jaw tightness, muscle tremors, feeling sick (but without nausea), other burdensome physical side effects, insomnia, and sleep disturbances. It has also been observed that DOM produces similar effects to LSD but causes less disorientation, impairment, and ego dissolution. The effects of DOM are highly dependent on set and setting, as with psychedelics in general. At lower doses of 2 to 5 mg, DOM is said to produce few or no physiological effects, no perceptual distortion, and more subtle visual, cognitive, and affective changes, but as not producing hallucinogenic effects at such doses. The drug was one of Shulgin's "magical half-dozen" psychedelic compounds in PiHKAL.

The effects of DOM were formally assessed in clinical studies by Solomon H. Snyder and Leo Hollister and colleagues in the late 1960s and early 1970s. At low doses, such as 1 to 4 mg, DOM produced effects including stimulation, euphoria, enhanced self-awareness, and mild dose-dependent perceptual disturbances. At higher doses, of above 5 to 7 mg, DOM produces marked and full psychedelic effects. Hallucinogenic effects were said to start at doses of more than 3 to 5 mg. Other effects of the drug were also described. Although Shulgin described the effects of DOM as typically lasting 14 to 20 hours, clinical studies with low doses reported a duration of only 5 to 8 hours, but with a lack of an unexpectedly long duration even at doses of up to 14 mg. Another source listed the average duration as only 8 to 15 hours at doses of 5 or 10 mg. The reasons for these discrepancies are unclear. The onset was 0.5 to 1.5 hours and peak effects occurred after 3 to 5 hours.

Low doses of DOM have been used as a stimulant, such as by the Grateful Dead. This may be the first known instance of psychedelic microdosing. The related drug DOET is also implicated as having stimulant and "psychic energizer" effects at low doses, which notably greatly impressed Shulgin.

== Interactions ==
The typical antipsychotic and serotonin 5-HT_{2A} receptor antagonist chlorpromazine has been reported to partially reduce the effects of DOM.

== Side effects ==
Side effects of DOM include sweating, muscle tremors, and large increases in heart rate. These are said to be worrisome and not seen with other psychedelics like LSD. (S)-DOM produces increased heart rate and blood pressure but no psychoactive effects, in contrast to (R)-DOM. It may be importantly involved in the physical side effects of DOM, such that enantiopure (R)-DOM might be better-tolerated.

=== Tolerance ===
Repeated administration of DOM results in rapid tolerance development. In one study, in which five people were given 6 mg DOM for 3 days, there were "extremely intense" effects the first day, but diminished effects on the third day, ranging from "moderately strong" to "felt absolutely nothing". In another study, in which two people were given gradually increasing doses from 1 to 12 mg over 8 days, there was development of marked partial tolerance to the effects of DOM. Tolerance developed to both the psychoactive and physiological effects of the drug.

== Overdose ==
Overdose of DOM can have a very long duration and result in an amphetamine psychosis-like state. It is said to have pronounced hallucinogenic effects as well as amphetamine-like side effects in overdose.

== Pharmacology ==
=== Pharmacodynamics ===
==== Actions ====
DOM activities
Target	Affinity (K_{i}, nM)
5-HT_{1A}	3,656–14,200 (K_{i}); 12,800–13,900 (EC_{50}); 54–74% (E_{max})
5-HT_{1B}	>10,000
5-HT_{1D}	209
5-HT_{1E}	3,542
5-HT_{1F}	ND
5-HT_{2A}	2.1–507 (K_{i}); 1.1–40 (EC_{50}); 44–132% (E_{max})
5-HT_{2B}	12–149 (K_{i}); 128–688 (EC_{50}); 85–91% (E_{max})
5-HT_{2C}	19–3,980 (K_{i}); 0.23–423 (EC_{50}); 81–119% (E_{max})
5-HT_{3}	>10,000
5-HT_{4}	ND
5-HT_{5A}	>10,000
5-HT_{6}	8,155
5-HT_{7}	1,591
α_{1A}	3,219–7,393
α_{1B}	>10,000
α_{1D}	ND
α_{2A}	580–>4,970
α_{2B}	874
α_{2C}	921
β_{1}	>10,000
β_{2}	49
D_{1}–D_{5}	>10,000
H_{1}–H_{4}	>10,000
M_{1}, M_{2}, M_{5}	>10,000
M_{3}, M_{4}	ND
TAAR_{1}	>30,000 (EC_{50})
I_{1}	>10,000
σ_{1}, σ_{2}	>10,000
SERT	>100,000 (K_{i}) >100,000 (IC_{50}) >100,000 (EC_{50})
NET	>100,000 (K_{i}) >70,000 (IC_{50}) >100,000 (EC_{50})
DAT	>100,000 (K_{i}); 64,000 (IC_{50}) >42,000 (EC_{50})
MAO-A	24,000 (IC_{50}) (rat)
MAO-B	>100,000 (IC_{50}) (rat)
Notes: The smaller the value, the more avidly the drug binds to the site. All proteins are human unless otherwise specified. Refs:

DOM acts as a selective serotonin 5-HT_{2A}, 5-HT_{2B}, and 5-HT_{2C} receptor full agonist. Its psychedelic effects are thought to be mediated by its agonistic properties at the serotonin 5-HT_{2A} receptor. Due to its selectivity, DOM is often used in scientific research in studies of the 5-HT_{2} receptor subfamily. DOM is a chiral molecule, and R-(−)-DOM is the more active enantiomer, functioning as a potent agonist of these receptors.

The drug is inactive as a human trace amine-associated receptor 1 (TAAR1) agonist but is an agonist of the rhesus monkey TAAR1. DOM is inactive as a monoamine reuptake inhibitor and releasing agent. It is a very weak monoamine oxidase inhibitor (MAOI), specifically of monoamine oxidase A (MAO-A), whereas it was inactive at monoamine oxidase B (MAO-B).

==== Effects ====
DOM produces the head-twitch response in rodents, a behavioral proxy of psychedelic-like effects. The head-twitch response produced by DOM is robust. It also substitutes for LSD in rodent drug discrimination tests. DOM is widely used as a psychedelic training drug in rodent drug discrimination assays and many other serotonergic psychedelics have been shown to generalize to it. Other effects of DOM in rodents include hyperlocomotion at lower doses, hypolocomotion at higher doses, and hypothermia at high doses.

In contrast to amphetamines like (−)-cathinone but similarly to mescaline, DOM has shown no stimulant-like or reinforcing effects in rhesus monkeys. Conversely however, DOC has shown reinforcing effects, including conditioned place preference (CPP) and self-administration, in rodents similarly to methamphetamine. This is analogous to other findings in which various 2C and NBOMe drugs have been found to produce dopaminergic elevations and reinforcing effects in rodents.

DOM has potent anti-inflammatory effects, which may have medical applications.

=== Pharmacokinetics ===
The pharmacokinetics of DOM, including in humans, have been very limitedly studied. The drug crosses the blood–brain barrier in rodents. Metabolites of DOM like 2-O-desmethyl-DOM (2-DM-DOM) and 5-O-desmethyl-DOM (5-DM-DOM) are pharmacologically active and show psychedelic-like effects in animal studies. They might contribute to the delayed onset and long duration of DOM in humans. However, these metabolites might also produce metabolism-dependent neurotoxicity via conversion into 2,5-DDM-DOM and subsequent transformation. 2,5-DDM-DOM is similar in chemical structure to 6-hydroxydopamine (6-OHDA) and has likewise been found to be a potent neurotoxin. About 5 to 20% of a dose of DOM is excreted unchanged in humans.

== Chemistry ==
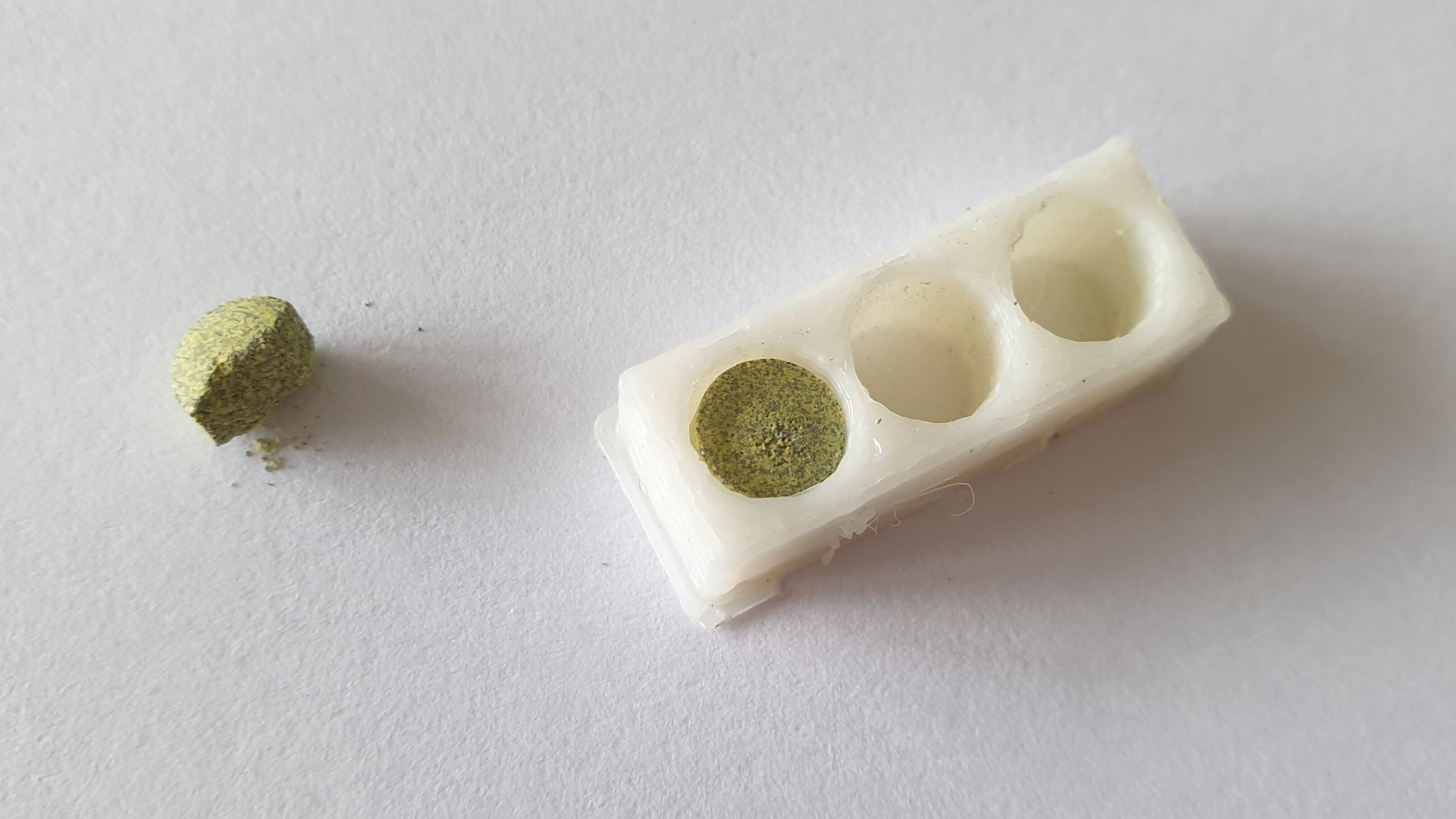
Sample of DOM.

DOM, also known as 2,5-dimethoxy-4-methylamphetamine or as 2,5-dimethoxy-4-methyl-α-methylphenethylamine, is a substituted phenethylamine and amphetamine and is a member of the DOx group of drugs. It is structurally related to the naturally occurring phenethylamine psychedelic mescaline (3,4,5-trimethoxyphenethylamine).

=== Properties ===
The chemical properties of DOM have been described.

=== Synthesis ===
The chemical synthesis of DOM has been described.

=== Analogues and derivatives ===
Analogues of DOM include other DOx drugs such as DOET, DOB, DOI, DOC, and TMA, among others. The α-desmethyl or phenethylamine analogue of DOM is 2C-D. Ariadne is the α-ethyl or phenylisobutylamine homologue of DOM. DOM analogues with the 2- and/or 5-methoxy groups replaced have been studied, for instance 2-DM-DOM (2-OH-DOM), 5-DM-DOM (5-OH-DOM), 2,5-DDM-DOM, 2-TOM (2-thio-DOM), 5-TOM (5-thio-TOM), bis-TOM (2,5-dithio-TOM), TOMSO (5-TOM-sulfoxide), and others.

Chemical structures of DOM analogues and derivatives
DOM (4-methyl-2,5-DMA)

DOB (4-bromo-2,5-DMA)

DOI (4-iodo-2,5-DMA)

DOET (Hecate; 4-ethyl-2,5-DMA)

DOPR (4-propyl-2,5-DMA)

DOIP (4-isopropyl-2,5-DMA)

DOBU (4-butyl-2,5-DMA)

DOIB (4-isobutyl-2,5-DMA)

DOSB (4-sec-butyl-2,5-DMA)

DOTB (4-tert-butyl-2,5-DMA)

DOAM (4-amyl-2,5-DMA)

DOHx (4-hexyl-2,5-DMA)

DOCT (4-octyl-2,5-DMA)

DOYN (4-ethynyl-2,5-DMA)

DOBz (4-benzyl-2,5-DMA)

DOPP (4-PhPr-2,5-DMA)

DOTFM (4-trifluoromethyl-2,5-DMA)

DOAc (4-acetyl-2,5-DMA)

DOCN (4-cyano-2,5-DMA)

2C-D (α-desmethyl-DOM)

Ariadne (4C-D, BL-3912, Dimoxamine)

Charmian (α-methyl-DOM)

β-Methyl-DOM (Daphne/Elvira)

Ganesha (G, G-0; 3-methyl-DOM)

Juno (6-methyl-DOM)

DOTMA (3,6-dimethyl-DOM)

Florence (DOM-2EtO)

Iris (DOM-5EtO)

G-3 (3,4-trimethylene-2,5-DMA)

G-4 (3,4-tetramethylene-2,5-DMA)

G-5 (3,4-norbornyl-2,5-DMA)

G-N

Beatrice (N-methyl-DOM)

N-Hydroxy-DOM (DOM-OH)

DOM-NBOMe

25D-NBOMe

DOM-NDEPA

25D-NM-NDEAOP (25D-NM-NDEPA)

DMCPA

DOM-CR (DOM-THIQ)

DOM-AI

DOM-AT

TFMBOX

DEMPDHPCA-2C-D

TMA (3,4,5-TMA)

Mescaline (3,4,5-TMPEA)

Desoxy (4-desoxymescaline)

ψ-DOM (psi-DOM)

2-DM-DOM (2-OH-DOM)

5-DM-DOM (5-OH-DOM)

2,5-DDM-DOM (2,5-diOH-DOM)

2-TOM (2-thio-DOM)

5-TOM (5-thio-DOM)

Bis-TOM (2,5-dithio-DOM)

TOMSO (5-TOM-sulfoxide)

== History ==
DOM was first synthesized and tested in 1963 by Alexander Shulgin, who was investigating the effect of 4-position substitutions on psychedelic amphetamines. His 15-year-old son Theodore "Ted" Shulgin assisted in the synthesis of DOM by performing the first step of the synthesis at Dow Chemical Company on June 22, 1963 during a brief period when he was interested in chemistry. Later, Alexander Shulgin completed the synthesis on November 30, 1963. He initially discovered the effects of DOM on January 4, 1964, when he ingested a 1 mg dose orally. The hallucinogenic effects of DOM were discovered on February 3, 1964 by Shulgin's colleague Thornton W. Sargent when he ingested 2.3 mg. The first clearly psychedelic experience occurred with a dose of 4.1 mg on November 6, 1964. Shulgin hoped that Dow Chemical Company would develop DOM for medical purposes.

In mid-1967, tablets containing 20 mg and later 10 mg of DOM were widely distributed in the Haight-Ashbury District of San Francisco under the name of STP, having been manufactured by underground chemists Owsley Stanley and Tim Scully. This short-lived appearance of DOM on the black market proved disastrous for several reasons. First, the tablets contained an excessively high dose of the chemical. This, combined with DOM's slow onset (which encouraged some users, familiar with drugs that have quicker onsets, such as LSD, to re-dose) and its remarkably long duration, caused many users to panic and sent some to the emergency room. Second, treatment of such overdoses was complicated by the fact that no one at the time knew that the tablets called STP were, in fact, DOM, and there was no effective antidote. Many people with DOM intoxication were treated by David E. Smith and colleagues at the Haight Ashbury Free Clinic as well as at San Francisco General Hospital.

== Society and culture ==
=== Names ===
The name DOM is an acronym of the code name "des-oxy-methyl" coined by the drug's inventor Alexander Shulgin. The drug was also initially known by the code name K-61,082 and is widely known by its nickname STP. The STP name has been said to stand for various acronyms, including Serenity, Tranquility, and Peace, Super Terrific Psychedelic, Stop The Police, and Too Stupid to Puke, among others.

=== Popular culture ===
DOM (STP) was featured in the 1968 psychedelic film Psych-Out.

=== Legal status ===
==== Australia ====
DOM is schedule 9 under the Australia Poisons standard. A schedule 9 substance is a "Substances which may be abused or misused, the manufacture, possession, sale or use of which should be prohibited by law except when required for medical or scientific research, or for analytical, teaching or training purposes with approval of Commonwealth and/or State or Territory Health Authorities."

==== Canada ====
DOM is a Schedule I controlled substance in Canada.

==== United Kingdom ====
DOM is a Class A drug in the United Kingdom under the Misuse of Drugs Act 1971.

==== United States ====
DOM is Schedule I in the United States. This means it is illegal to manufacture, buy, possess, or distribute (make, trade, own or give) without a DEA license.

== Research ==
DOM, along with DOET, was of interest in the potential treatment of psychiatric disorders such as depression in the 1960s. Subsequently, the related compound Ariadne (4C-D; BL-3912; Dimoxamine) was investigated in the 1970s, but was not marketed either.

== See also ==
- DOx (psychedelics)
- Stimulant § Serotonin 5-HT_{2A} receptor agonists
- Motivation-enhancing drug § Serotonin 5-HT_{2A} receptor agonists
- ASR-2001 (2CB-5PrO)
