= 2C-CP =

Chemical compound

Clinical data
- Other names: 2C-cP; 4-Cyclopropyl-2,5-dimethoxyphenethylamine; 2,5-Dimethoxy-4-cyclopropylphenethylamine
- Routes of administration: Oral
- Drug class: Serotonin receptor modulator; Serotonergic psychedelic; Hallucinogen

Pharmacokinetic data
- Duration of action: 3–6 hours

Identifiers
- IUPAC name: 2-(4-cyclopropyl-2,5-dimethoxyphenyl)ethanamine
- CAS Number: 2888537-46-8
- PubChem CID: 163192739
- ChemSpider: 129558507
- UNII: DM2CVZ27AQ
- CompTox Dashboard (EPA): DTXSID101337025

Chemical and physical data
- Formula: C_{13}H_{19}NO_{2}
- Molar mass: 221.300 g·mol^{−1}
- 3D model (JSmol): Interactive image
- SMILES: COc1cc(c(cc1CCN)OC)C1CC1
- InChI: InChI=1S/C13H19NO2/c1-15-12-8-11(9-3-4-9)13(16-2)7-10(12)5-6-14/h7-9H,3-6,14H2,1-2H3; Key:WSMVNFNZKKZCPU-UHFFFAOYSA-N

2C-CP, or 2C-cP, also known as 4-cyclopropyl-2,5-dimethoxyphenethylamine, is a psychedelic and designer drug of the phenethylamine and 2C families. It was first synthesized by Daniel Trachsel and colleagues in 2006 and was subsequently described by them in the literature in 2013.

2C-CP is active at a dose of between 15 and 35 mg orally with a duration of 3 to 6 hours. Its effects were described as rather diffuse and undefinable, with its full effects having not yet been explored. Analogues of 2C-CP include 2C-CPE, 2C-IP, 2C-P, 2C-T-15, 2C-V, and 2C-YN, among others.

The drug is a controlled substance in Canada under phenethylamine blanket-ban language. It is not an explicitly controlled substance in the United States, but it could be considered a controlled substance under the Federal Analogue Act if intended for human consumption.

The drug has an affinity (K_{i}) of 95 nM at the serotonin 5-HT_{2A} receptor and of 41 nM at the 5-HT_{2C} receptor.

== See also ==
- 2C (psychedelics)
