= 2,5-Dimethoxy-4-hexylamphetamine =

DOHx

Clinical data
- Other names: 2,5-Dimethoxy-4-hexylamphetamine; 2,5-Dimethoxy-4-n-hexylamphetamine; 4-Hexyl-2,5-dimethoxyamphetamine; DOHx; DOHX; DOHE
- Drug class: Serotonin 5-HT_{2} receptor modulator; Serotonin receptor antagonist
- ATC code: None

Identifiers
- IUPAC name: 1-(4-hexyl-2,5-dimethoxyphenyl)propan-2-amine
- CAS Number: 125903-45-9
- PubChem CID: 44265170
- ChemSpider: 23108583
- ChEMBL: ChEMBL268890

Chemical and physical data
- Formula: C_{17}H_{29}NO_{2}
- Molar mass: 279.424 g·mol^{−1}
- 3D model (JSmol): Interactive image
- SMILES: CCCCCCC1=CC(=C(C=C1OC)CC(C)N)OC
- InChI: InChI=1S/C17H29NO2/c1-5-6-7-8-9-14-11-17(20-4)15(10-13(2)18)12-16(14)19-3/h11-13H,5-10,18H2,1-4H3; Key:NICYQFWHLYLNFE-UHFFFAOYSA-N

2,5-Dimethoxy-4-hexylamphetamine (DOHx or DOHE) is a non-hallucinogenic serotonin receptor modulator of the phenethylamine, amphetamine, and DOx families.

== Pharmacology ==
=== Pharmacodynamics ===
DOHx has shown the highest affinity for the serotonin 5-HT_{2A} and 5-HT_{2C} receptors of any other assessed DOx drug in multiple studies. In one study, its affinities for the human serotonin 5-HT_{2} receptors were 0.1 nM for the 5-HT_{2A} receptor, 30 nM for the 5-HT_{2B} receptor, and 0.7 nM for 5-HT_{2C} receptor. In the case of the serotonin 5-HT_{2A} receptor, this was 6- to 14-fold higher than DOB, DOI, and DOC and was 9-fold higher than DOPR. In another study, DOHx showed 25-fold higher affinity for the serotonin 5-HT_{2A} receptor than DOM or DOET, 23- to 28-fold higher affinity than DOPR and DOBU, and 2.8-fold higher affinity than DOAM. Conversely, it showed only slightly higher or roughly the same affinity for the receptor relative to DOCT (2.5 nM vs. 3.0 nM, respectively).

In contrast to many other DOx drugs, DOHx, as well as related drugs like DOCT, have been found to act as serotonin 5-HT_{2} receptor antagonists rather than as an agonists, and hence would not be expected to be serotonergic psychedelics. In accordance, DOHx, DOCT, and other related drugs do not produce DOM-like effects in rodent drug discrimination tests. DOHx has also been assessed and found to act as a silent antagonist of the serotonin 5-HT_{2B} receptor (E_{max} = 0%).

== Chemistry ==
DOHx is part of the series of 4-alkylated DOx drugs that includes DOM (methyl), DOET (ethyl), DOPR (propyl), DOBU (butyl), and DOAM (amyl/pentyl), with DOHx having a hexyl substitution and hence the longest alkyl chain of the preceding drugs. Following DOHx in the series are DOHP (heptyl) and then DOCT (octyl).

=== Synthesis ===
The chemical synthesis of DOHx has been described.

== History ==
DOHx was first described in the scientific literature by Richard Glennon and colleagues by 1989.

== Society and culture ==
=== Legal status ===
==== Canada ====
DOHx is a controlled substance in Canada under phenethylamine blanket-ban language.

== See also ==
- DOx (psychedelics)
