= 2C-tBu =

Clinical data
- Other names: 2,5-Dimethoxy-4-tert-butylphenethylamine; 4-tert-Butyl-2,5-dimethoxyphenethylamine; 2C-TBU; 2C-t-Bu
- Routes of administration: Oral
- Drug class: Serotonin receptor agonist; Serotonin 5-HT_{2A} receptor agonist; Serotonergic psychedelic; Hallucinogen
- ATC code: None

Pharmacokinetic data
- Duration of action: Unknown

Identifiers
- IUPAC name: 2-(4-tert-butyl-2,5-dimethoxyphenyl)ethanamine
- PubChem CID: 117347542
- ChemSpider: 76370331

Chemical and physical data
- Formula: C_{14}H_{23}NO_{2}
- Molar mass: 237.343 g·mol^{−1}
- 3D model (JSmol): Interactive image
- SMILES: CC(C)(C)C1=C(C=C(C(=C1)OC)CCN)OC
- InChI: InChI=1S/C14H23NO2/c1-14(2,3)11-9-12(16-4)10(6-7-15)8-13(11)17-5/h8-9H,6-7,15H2,1-5H3; Key:MHNFTGKRRUDUST-UHFFFAOYSA-N

2C-tBu, or 2C-t-Bu, also known as 4-tert-butyl-2,5-dimethoxyphenethylamine, is a serotonin receptor agonist and putative serotonergic psychedelic of the phenethylamine and 2C families.

== Use and effects ==
The active dose of 2C-tBu in humans is >5 mg orally per Daniel Trachsel and its duration is unknown. Initial tests with 7 mg and with 10 mg (as 5 mg plus 5 mg 2 hours apart) orally produced no psychedelic effects in humans, but instead induced a pronounced and long-lasting tiredness. It was hypothesized by Daniel Trachsel and colleagues that 2C-tBu might be a serotonin 5-HT_{2A} receptor antagonist and might thereby be hypnotic, but it was instead shown to be an agonist in subsequent studies.

== Pharmacology ==
=== Pharmacodynamics ===
2C-tBu is a potent serotonin 5-HT_{2A} receptor agonist (K_{i} = 9.9–35 nM, EC_{50} = 4.2 nM) and also binds to the serotonin 5-HT_{2C} receptor (K_{i} = 7–24 nM). The drug produces a robust head-twitch response, a behavioral proxy of psychedelic effects, in rodents. It also produces hyperlocomotion in rodents.

== Chemistry ==
=== Analogues ===
Analogues of 2C-tBu include 2C-Bu, 2C-iBu, 2C-sBu, and DOTB, among others.

== History ==
2C-tBu was first described in the scientific literature by Daniel Trachsel and colleagues in 2013.

== Society and culture ==
=== Legal status ===
==== Canada ====
2C-tBu is a controlled substance in Canada under phenethylamine blanket-ban language.

== See also ==
- 2C (psychedelics)
