= Hyperawareness =

Altered state of consciousness

Hyperawareness, or heightened awareness, is an altered state of consciousness in which a person experiences increased awareness or perception of their surrounding environment, body, and/or mind. It has been found to be an often-experienced effect of psychedelic drugs such as LSD.
