= Dihydroalprenolol =

Names
- IUPAC name 1-(Isopropylamino)-3-(2-propylphenoxy)-2-propanol

Identifiers
CAS Number	60106-89-0
3D model (JSmol)	Interactive image
ChemSpider	39384
PubChem CID	43216
UNII	2ZT5710I4T
CompTox Dashboard (EPA)	DTXSID40866788
- InChI: InChI=1S/C15H25NO2/c1-4-7-13-8-5-6-9-15(13)18-11-14(17)10-16-12(2)3/h5-6,8-9,12,14,16-17H,4,7,10-11H2,1-3H3 Key: JVHCMYZFGCOCTD-UHFFFAOYSA-N
- SMILES: CCCC1=CC=CC=C1OCC(CNC(C)C)O

Properties
Chemical formula	C_{15}H_{25}NO_{2}
Molar mass	251.370 g·mol^{−1}
- Except where otherwise noted, data are given for materials in their standard state (at 25 °C [77 °F], 100 kPa). Infobox references

Dihydroalprenolol (DHA) is a hydrogenated alprenolol derivative that acts as a beta-adrenergic blocker. When the extra hydrogen atoms are tritium, it is a radiolabeled form of alprenolol, which is used to label beta-adrenergic receptors for isolation.

== Physicochemical properties ==
It has a XLogP3 value of 3.4. Its hydrogen bond donor count is 2 and its hydrogen bond acceptor is 3. Its surface area is 41.5 Å² and has 18 heavy atoms.

== Use as research tool ==
In 1976, research conducted on rat and monkey brain membranes paved the road for research on dihydroalprenolol binding sites because it showed that dihydroalprenolol was able to label beta-adrenergic receptor sites with high affinity. In this way, research of dihydroalprenolol coupled with other co-factors became of interest for use in drug discovery In 1979, researchers were interested in seeing how dihydroalprenolol affected the body so they tested the amount of dihydroalprenolol within frogs and rats in vivo. Researchers found that the highest amounts of dihydroalprenolol were in the liver, followed by the lungs, kidneys, heart, adipose tissue, and brain respectively. In 1985, further research was done to analyze dihydroalprenolol activity in the human frontal cortex. Researchers found that dihydroalprenolol was most likely associated nonspecifically to membrane lipids because of it ability to bind to β-1 and β-2 receptors and a low-affinity site. In 1986, researchers hypothesized that there was a relationship between dihydroalprenolol and major depression. So they studied an olfactory bulbectomized rat model of major depression. Although dihydroalprenolol's binding in the midbrain was the same, there was an increased binding of 30% in the pons and 15% in the hippocampus. In 1989, researchers found that dihydroalprenolol had the ability to bind to 5-HT1 receptors in the brain, but only in specific conditions.

=== Beta 3 adrenoceptor ===
3H-dihydroalprenolol is typically used as a ligand when researching beta-adrenoceptor binding assay in rat brains. It allows researchers to analyze the binding characteristics of 3H-dihydroalprenolol. Some key findings were within the β-adrenoceptor molecule. In this molecule, carbohydrate moieties of the cell surface likely play an important part in the drug-receptor interaction. In this way, β-adrenoceptor molecule is likely a glycoprotein that has N-linked carbohydrate chains. The binding characteristics of 3H-dihydroalprenolol also allowed researchers to understand the importance of anionic and cationic charges of glycocalyx, phospholipid or protein in rat brains. This was discovered by analyzing the relationship between polymeric effectors, DNA, heparin, polymyxin B, histone, gelatin, colominic acid and bovine serum albumin (BSA) and the affinity of β-adrenoceptor.

=== Adenylate cyclase ===
The binding characteristic of 3H-dihydroalprenolol can be used to study heart disease. Research conducted on an isolated left atria of male Wistar rats, helped understand the relationship between polyamine modifying drugs and isoproterenol-elicited cardiotonic effect. When 3H-dihydroalprenolol bound to beta-adrenoceptors, putrescine resulted in increased adenylyl cyclase activity, consequently inducing a positive inotropism and increased intracellular cAMP. The binding characteristic of 3H-dihydroalprenolol can also be used to study tumor growth because tumor binding sites typically have high affinity for 3H-dihydroalprenolol. Different studies have indicated that adrenocortical carcinoma have beta-adrenergic receptor-binding sites that are not usually found in adrenal tissue membrane.
