= 2C-P =

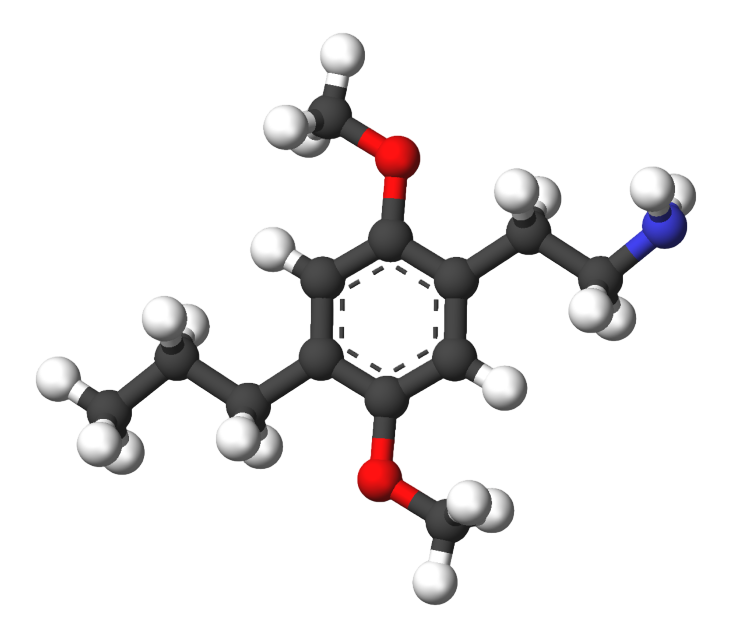

Clinical data
- Other names: 2C-Pr; 4-Propyl-2,5-dimethoxyphenethylamine; 2,5-Dimethoxy-4-propylphenethylamine; 2C-DOPR; 2C-DOPr; Selene
- Routes of administration: Oral
- Drug class: Serotonin 5-HT_{2} receptor agonist; Serotonin 5-HT_{2A} receptor agonist; Serotonergic psychedelic; Hallucinogen
- ATC code: None

Pharmacokinetic data
- Onset of action: 1–2 hours Peak: 3 hours
- Duration of action: 10–16 hours

Identifiers
- IUPAC name: 2-(2,5-dimethoxy-4-propylphenyl)ethan-1-amine
- CAS Number: 207740-22-5
- PubChem CID: 44350080
- ChemSpider: 21106226
- UNII: DPS1JI878J
- ChEMBL: ChEMBL339136
- CompTox Dashboard (EPA): DTXSID30174849

Chemical and physical data
- Formula: C_{13}H_{21}NO_{2}
- Molar mass: 223.316 g·mol^{−1}
- 3D model (JSmol): Interactive image
- Melting point: 207 to 209 °C (405 to 408 °F) (hydrochloride)
- Solubility in water: 7–9 mg/mL (20 °C) mg/mL (20 °C)
- SMILES: COC1=C(CCN)C=C(OC)C(CCC)=C1
- InChI: InChI=1S/C13H21NO2/c1-4-5-10-8-13(16-3)11(6-7-14)9-12(10)15-2/h8-9H,4-7,14H2,1-3H3; Key:PZJOKFZGPTVNBF-UHFFFAOYSA-N

2C-P, also known as 4-propyl-2,5-dimethoxyphenethylamine or as Selene, is a psychedelic drug of the phenethylamine and 2C families. It is taken orally and is among the most potent and long-lasting of the 2C psychedelics.

2C-P was first described in the literature by Alexander Shulgin in his 1991 book PiHKAL (Phenethylamines I Have Known and Loved) in 1991.

== Use and effects ==
In his book PiHKAL (Phenethylamines I Have Known and Loved), Alexander Shulgin lists 2C-P's dose range as 6 to 10 mg orally and its duration as 10 to 16 hours. A wider dosage range of 1 to 16 mg or more, with a typical dose estimate of 7 mg, has also been reported. Shulgin wrote in PiHKAL that while most reports with doses of 6 to 12 mg were positive, a single report of 16 mg was described as a clear overdose and "physical disaster" that was "not to be repeated". He described the drug as having a steep dose–response curve and advised careful individual dose titration. 2C-P is also said to come on slowly, with an onset of 1 to 2 hours and peak effects not occurring until after 3 hours. The drug is one of the most potent psychedelics of the 2C family, rivaled only by 2C-TFM. It is taken orally.

The effects of 2C-P have been reported to include closed-eye imagery, beautiful psychedelic visuals, insights, emotional enhancement, increased appreciation of music and eroticism, feelings of energy flowing through oneself, physical discomfort, back and leg pain, next-day hangover, and an afterglow.

== Overdose ==
Unknown or unreported doses taken by teenagers at a Connecticut, United States concert in September 2013 caused seven people to require emergency medical help including CPR and defibrillation to resuscitate some of them, with all seven being taken to a hospital and four of those being hospitalized until at least the next day. It was reported that none of the overdose victims died while CNN's "OutFront" blog claimed the police called it a "mass casualty event" blaming the problems on 2C-P and drugs apparently being sold as "Molly", a common name for MDMA.

Louella Fletcher-Michie, the daughter of actor John Michie, died from a 2C-P overdose in September 2017 at the Bestival festival in Dorset, United Kingdom, the first reported death from 2C-P. Her boyfriend was found guilty of manslaughter, for giving her the drug and failing to act to help her for over six hours after she overdosed. His conviction for failing to act was quashed in August 2020.

== Interactions ==
2C drugs like 2C-P are known to be metabolized by the monoamine oxidase (MAO) enzymes MAO-A and MAO-B. Monoamine oxidase inhibitors (MAOIs) such as phenelzine, tranylcypromine, moclobemide, and selegiline may potentiate the effects of 2C drugs like 2C-P. This may result in overdose and serious toxicity.

== Pharmacology ==
=== Pharmacodynamics ===
2C-P activities
Target	Affinity (K_{i}, nM)
5-HT_{1A}	110
5-HT_{1B}	ND
5-HT_{1D}	ND
5-HT_{1E}	ND
5-HT_{1F}	ND
5-HT_{2A}	8.1 (K_{i}); 10.2–90 (EC_{50}); 63–183% (E_{max})
5-HT_{2B}	ND (K_{i}); 130 (EC_{50}); 72% (E_{max})
5-HT_{2C}	40 (K_{i}); ND (EC_{50}); ND (E_{max})
5-HT_{3}	ND
5-HT_{4}	ND
5-HT_{5A}	ND
5-HT_{6}	ND
5-HT_{7}	ND
α_{1A}	3,500
α_{1B}, α_{1D}	ND
α_{2A}	90
α_{2B}, α_{2C}	ND
β_{1}–β_{3}	ND
D_{1}	8,400
D_{2}	2,300
D_{3}	5,200
D_{4}, D_{5}	ND
H_{1}	21,000
H_{2}–H_{4}	ND
M_{1}–M_{5}	ND
I_{1}	ND
σ_{1}, σ_{2}	ND
TAAR1	280 (K_{i}) (mouse); 20 (K_{i}) (rat); 560 (EC_{50}) (mouse); 30 (EC_{50}) (rat); 4,200 (EC_{50}) (human); 91% (E_{max}) (mouse); 84% (E_{max}) (rat); 72% (E_{max}) (human)
SERT	19,000 (K_{i}); 30,000 (IC_{50}); ND (EC_{50})
NET	18,000 (K_{i}); 94,000 (IC_{50}); ND (EC_{50})
DAT	40,000 (K_{i}); 198,000 (IC_{50}); ND (EC_{50})
Notes: The smaller the value, the more avidly the drug binds to the site. All proteins are human unless otherwise specified. Refs:

2C-P acts as an agonist of the serotonin 5-HT_{2} receptors. It also binds to the serotonin 5-HT_{1A} receptor with about 14-fold lower affinity than for the serotonin 5-HT_{2A} receptor. The drug shows little or no affinity for the monoamine transporters (MATs) and shows very weak or negligible monoamine reuptake inhibition. It shows high affinity for the rat trace amine-associated receptor 1 (TAAR1) and lower but still high affinity for the mouse TAAR1.

In contrast to many other psychedelics, 2C-P, as well as 2C-C and certain 2C NBOMe analogues, has shown reinforcing effects in rodents. It produces dose-dependent conditioned place preference (CPP) in mice and self-administration in rats. These findings suggest that 2C-P may have misuse potential. The mechanism by which these effects are produced is unknown. However, 2C-P was found to decrease dopamine transporter (DAT) expression and to increase DAT phosphorylation in the nucleus accumbens similarly to methamphetamine in rodents. Decreased DAT expression may result in reduced dopamine reuptake, while DAT phosphorylation is associated with dopamine reverse transport and efflux, in turn increasing extracellular dopamine levels.

2C-P has also been found to produce neurotoxicity at high doses in rodents, which appears to be mediated via neuroinflammation.

The drug only weakly inhibits the monoamine oxidases.

== Chemistry ==
2C-P is 2,5-dimethoxy-4-n-propylphenethylamine. The full name of the chemical is 2-(2,5-dimethoxy-4-propylphenyl)ethanamine. The hydrochloride salt is the most common form, normally found as a white powder, or white crystals.

=== Properties ===
Alexander Shulgin's 2C-P crude freebase (soluble in chloroform), after "removal of the solvent under vacuum," was an off-white colored oil which he distilled at 100–110 °C at 40 Pa (0.3 mmHg) (turning it "water white" in color), and it "spontaneously crystallized" upon cooling.

=== Synthesis ===
The chemical synthesis of 2C-P has been described.

=== Analogues ===
Analogues of 2C-P include 2C-D, 2C-E, 2C-Bu, 2C-iP, 2C-iBu, DOPR, and 4C-P, among others.

== History ==
2C-P was first described in the literature by Alexander Shulgin in his 1991 book PiHKAL (Phenethylamines I Have Known and Loved) in 1991.

== Society and culture ==
=== Popular culture ===
In the first episode of the CBS fictional TV drama series Battle Creek, a local police detective is tasked with solving a double murder where an assisting FBI agent claims the victims were operating a clandestine laboratory manufacturing 2C-P.

=== Legal status ===
2C-P is not scheduled by the United Nations' Convention on Psychotropic Substances.

==== Canada ====
As of October 31, 2016; 2C-P is a controlled substance (Schedule III) in Canada.

==== China ====
As of October 2015 2C-P is a controlled substance in China.

==== Denmark ====
In Denmark, 2C-P has been added to the list of Schedule B controlled substances.

==== Finland ====
Scheduled in "government decree on psychoactive substances banned from the consumer market".

==== Germany ====
2C-P is an Anlage I controlled drug.

==== Sweden ====
The Riksdag added 2C-P to Narcotic Drugs Punishments Act under swedish schedule I ("substances, plant materials and fungi which normally do not have medical use" ) as of August 16, 2016, published by Medical Products Agency (MPA) in regulation HSLF-FS 2016:80 listed as 2,5-dimetoxi-4-propylfenetylamin.

==== United Kingdom ====
2C-P is a Class A drug in the UK.

==== United States ====
2C-P was placed into Schedule I (with the DEA Drug Code of 7524) making it illegal to possess, distribute and/or manufacture without a license in the United States by an act of the US Congress on July 9, 2012 when US President Barack Obama signed the Synthetic Drug Abuse Prevention Act of 2012 (SDAPA). The law came into effect on January 4, 2013.

== See also ==
- 2C (psychedelics)
