= Xibenolol =

Chemical compound

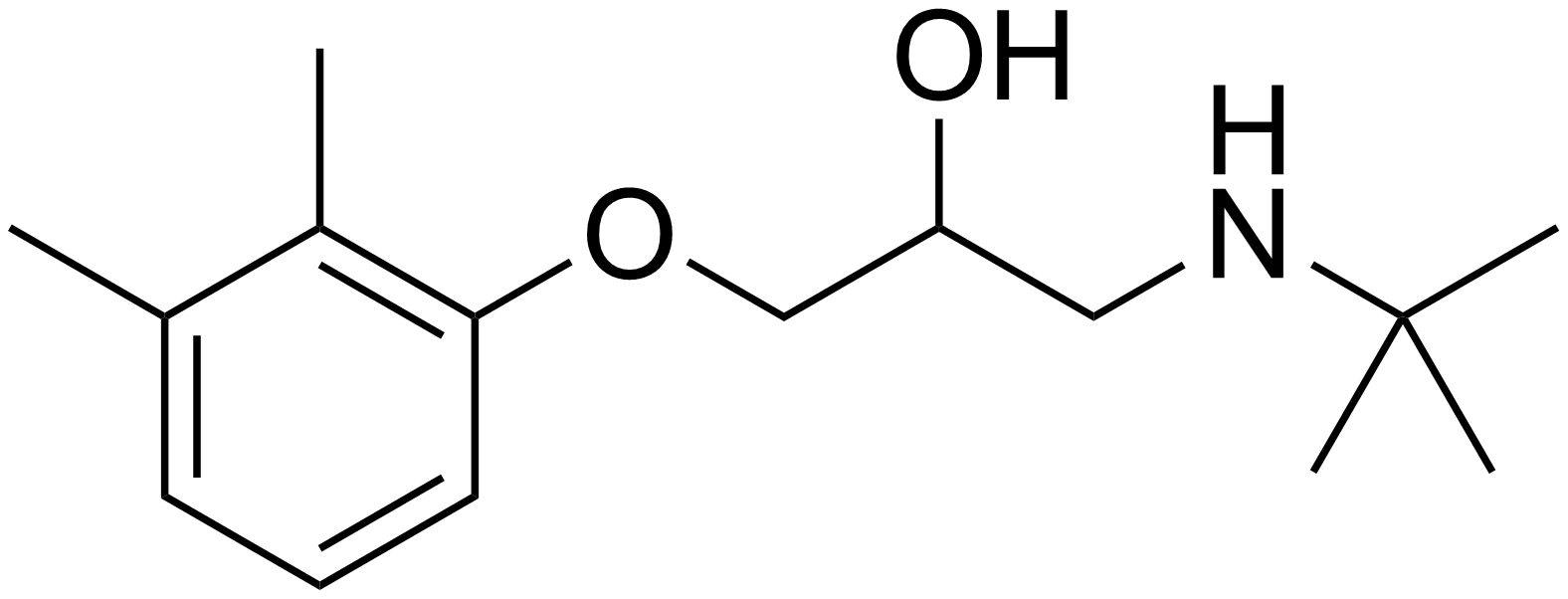

Clinical data
- ATC code: none

Identifiers
- IUPAC name: 1-(tert-Butylamino)-3-(2,3-dimethylphenoxy)propan-2-ol
- CAS Number: 30187-90-7
- PubChem CID: 146256
- ChemSpider: 129009
- UNII: 0871JY946G
- CompTox Dashboard (EPA): DTXSID0043848

Chemical and physical data
- Formula: C_{15}H_{25}NO_{2}
- Molar mass: 251.370 g·mol^{−1}
- 3D model (JSmol): Interactive image
- SMILES: O(c1cccc(c1C)C)CC(O)CNC(C)(C)C

Xibenolol is a beta blocker.
