= Leo Hollister =

Leo E. Hollister (December 3, 1920 - December 19, 2000) was an American professor emeritus of medicine, psychiatry and pharmacology.

== Work on hallucinogens ==
L. E. Hollister's criteria for establishing that a drug is hallucinogenic are as follows:

- in proportion to other effects, changes in thought, perception, and mood should predominate;
- intellectual or memory impairment should be minimal;
- stupor, narcosis, or excessive stimulation should not be an integral effect;
- autonomic nervous system side effects should be minimal; and
- addictive craving should be absent.

== Bibliography ==
=== Books ===
- Csernansky, Leo E. Hollister, John G. (1990). Clinical pharmacology of psychotherapeutic drugs (3rd ed.). New York: Churchill Livingstone. ISBN 9780443086700.
- Lasagna, Ed. Leo E. Hollister, Louis (1989). The Year book of drug therapy 1989. Chicago: Year Book Medical Publ. ISBN 9780815146148.
- Hollister, Ole J. Rafaelsen [and] Leo E. (1979). Psycho-therapeutic drugs : an ulta-short practice (1st ed.). Copenhagen: Munksgaard. ISBN 9788716080943.
- Hollister, Leo E. (1977). Clinical use of psychotherapeutic drugs (3. print ed.). Springfield, Ill.: Thomas. ISBN 9780398027490.
- Hollister, Leo E. (1972). Chemical psychoses : LSD and related drugs (2. impr. ed.). Springfield, Ill.: Thomas. ISBN 9780398008604.
