= 2,5-Dimethoxy-4-butylamphetamine =

Substituted amphetamine psychedelic drug

DOBU

Clinical data
- Other names: DOBU; 2,5-Dimethoxy-4-butylamphetamine; 4-Butyl-2,5-dimethoxyamphetamine
- Routes of administration: Oral
- Drug class: Serotonin 5-HT_{2} receptor agonist; Serotonin 5-HT_{2A} receptor agonist; Serotonergic psychedelic; Hallucinogen
- ATC code: None

Pharmacokinetic data
- Duration of action: "Very long"

Identifiers
- IUPAC name: 1-(4-butyl-2,5-dimethoxyphenyl)propan-2-amine
- CAS Number: 63779-89-5
- PubChem CID: 10060720
- ChemSpider: 8236274
- UNII: 6ARH6DPN4N
- ChEMBL: ChEMBL8214
- CompTox Dashboard (EPA): DTXSID90434976

Chemical and physical data
- Formula: C_{15}H_{25}NO_{2}
- Molar mass: 251.370 g·mol^{−1}
- 3D model (JSmol): Interactive image
- SMILES: C1(=CC(=C(C=C1CC(C)N)OC)CCCC)OC
- InChI: InChI=1S/C15H25NO2/c1-5-6-7-12-9-15(18-4)13(8-11(2)16)10-14(12)17-3/h9-11H,5-8,16H2,1-4H3; Key:NGVDYAULSQKEGW-UHFFFAOYSA-N

2,5-Dimethoxy-4-butylamphetamine (DOBU) is a psychedelic drug of the phenethylamine, amphetamine, and DOx families related to DOM. It is the derivative of DOM in which the methyl group at the 4 position has been replaced with a butyl group. The drug is taken orally.

It acts as a serotonin receptor agonist, including of the serotonin 5-HT_{2A} receptor. The drug produces psychedelic-like effects in animals.

DOBU was first described in the literature by Alexander Shulgin in 1970. Subsequently, it was described in greater detail by Shulgin in his 1991 book PiHKAL (Phenethylamines I Have Known and Loved).

== Use and effects ==
In his book PiHKAL (Phenethylamines I Have Known and Loved) and other publications, Alexander Shulgin and colleagues stated that doses of 1 to 3 mg orally produced clear threshold effects and that it was active at a dose of slightly more than twice that of DOM. It was stated that 10 mg DOBU was required to produce hallucinogenic effects. The drug's duration was listed as "very long". There was limited investigation of its qualitative effects. However, in PiHKAL, at the assessed doses of 2.2 mg and 2.8 mg, it was described as producing paresthesia and difficulty sleeping with few other effects. The effects of higher doses of DOBU have not been described beyond them producing hallucinogenic effects.

== Pharmacology ==
=== Pharmacodynamics ===
Compared to shorter-chain homologues such as DOM, DOET, and DOPR, which are all potent psychedelics, DOBU has even higher affinity for the serotonin 5-HT_{2A} receptor. It has been found to act as a potent full agonist of the serotonin 5-HT_{2A} and 5-HT_{2C} receptors. The drug is also a serotonin 5-HT_{2B} receptor full agonist but with far lower potency. Additional receptor interactions have also been described.

DOBU fully substitutes for DOM in rodent drug discrimination tests, albeit several-fold less potently than DOET or DOPR. In addition, DOBU robustly induces the head-twitch response, a behavioral proxy of psychedelic-like effects, in rodents, and maximally does so about as strongly as other DOx drugs like DOM, DOET, DOPR, and DOC. The doses at which DOBU produces peak head twitches are similar to those of DOM and DOET.

Other effects of DOBU in rodents include hyperlocomotion at lower doses, hypolocomotion at higher doses, and hypothermia at higher doses.

=== Pharmacokinetics ===
DOBU crosses the blood–brain barrier in rodents.

== Chemistry ==
=== Synthesis ===
The chemical synthesis of DOBU has been described.

=== Analogues ===
Analogues of DOBU include 2,5-dimethoxyamphetamine (2,5-DMA), DOM, DOET, DOPR, DOAM, DOHx, and 2C-Bu, among others.

==== Isomers ====
Alternative skeletal isomers of DOBU can also be produced, where the 4-(n-butyl) group of DOBU is replaced with any of the three other butyl isomers, the iso-butyl, sec-butyl and tert-butyl compounds being called DOIB, DOSB, and DOTB, respectively. All are significantly less potent than DOBU, with DOIB being active at around 10–15 mg, and DOSB at 25–30 mg. The most highly branched isomer DOTB was completely inactive in both animal and human trials. However, it was also reported that DOTB and DOAM partially generalized to DOM in animal drug discrimination tests.

Chemical structures of DOBU and its skeletal isomers
DOBU

DOiB

DOsB

DOtB

== History ==
DOBU was first described in the literature by Alexander Shulgin in 1970. Subsequently, it was described in greater detail by Shulgin in his book PiHKAL (Phenethylamines I Have Known and Loved) in 1991.

== Society and culture ==
=== Legal status ===
==== Canada ====
DOBU is a controlled substance in Canada under phenethylamine blanket-ban language.

==== United States ====
DOBU is not an explicitly controlled substance in the United States. However, it could be considered a controlled substance under the Federal Analogue Act if intended for human consumption.

== See also ==
- DOx (psychedelics)
