= 2,5-Dimethoxy-4-amylamphetamine =

DOAM

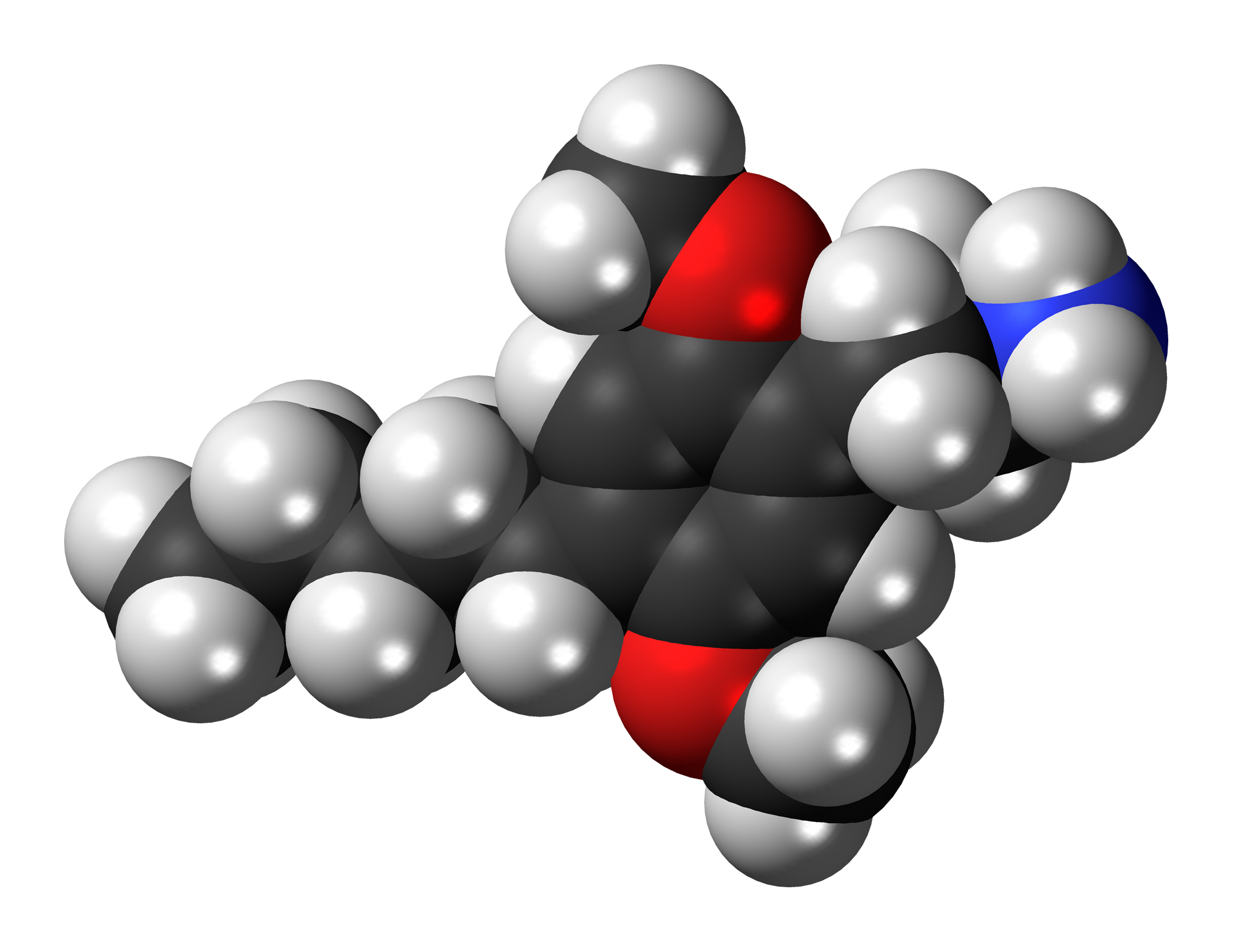

Clinical data
- Other names: DOAM; 2,5-Dimethoxy-4-amylamphetamine; 4-Amyl-2,5-dimethoxyamphetamine; 2,5-Dimethoxy-4-pentylamphetamine; 4-Pentyl-2,5-dimethoxyamphetamine
- Routes of administration: Oral
- Drug class: Serotonin 5-HT_{2} receptor agonist; Serotonin 5-HT_{2A} receptor agonist; Serotonergic psychedelic; Hallucinogen
- ATC code: None

Pharmacokinetic data
- Duration of action: Unknown

Identifiers
- IUPAC name: 1-(2,5-dimethoxy-4-pentylphenyl)propan-2-amine
- CAS Number: 63779-90-8
- PubChem CID: 12262512
- ChemSpider: 10440619
- UNII: N80EWL36CB
- ChEMBL: ChEMBL161416
- CompTox Dashboard (EPA): DTXSID50482958

Chemical and physical data
- Formula: C_{16}H_{27}NO_{2}
- Molar mass: 265.397 g·mol^{−1}
- 3D model (JSmol): Interactive image
- SMILES: CCCCCC1=CC(OC)=C(CC(C)N)C=C1OC
- InChI: InChI=1S/C16H27NO2/c1-5-6-7-8-13-10-16(19-4)14(9-12(2)17)11-15(13)18-3/h10-12H,5-9,17H2,1-4H3; Key:VLJORLCVOAUUKM-UHFFFAOYSA-N

2,5-Dimethoxy-4-amylamphetamine (DOAM), also known as 2,5-dimethoxy-4-pentylamphetamine, is a psychedelic drug of the phenethylamine, amphetamine, and DOx families related to DOM. It is the derivative of DOM in which the methyl group at the 4 position has been replaced with an amyl (pentyl) group. The drug is taken orally.

It is a serotonin receptor agonist, including of the serotonin 5-HT_{2A} receptor. The drug produces weak and mixed psychedelic-like effects in animals.

DOAM was first described in the scientific literature by Alexander Shulgin and colleagues in 1975. Subsequently, it was described in greater detail by Shulgin in his 1991 book PiHKAL (Phenethylamines I Have Known and Loved).

== Use and effects ==
In his book PiHKAL (Phenethylamines I Have Known and Loved), Alexander Shulgin lists the dose of DOAM as greater than 10 mg orally and its duration as unknown. DOAM was reported to produce a bare threshold and tenseness. In other publications however, DOAM has been said to produce threshold effects at 5 to 10 mg orally and to be hallucinogenic at a dose of 40 mg orally, with about 10-fold higher potency than mescaline. In any case, it shows far lower psychedelic potency than other DOx drugs such as DOM. No qualitative description of its effects at hallucinogenic doses is available.

== Pharmacology ==
=== Pharmacodynamics ===
DOAM has been found to be a moderate- to high-efficacy partial agonist of the serotonin 5-HT_{2A} receptor. It also shows lower affinity for the serotonin 5-HT_{2B} and 5-HT_{2C} receptors, whereas it has very low affinity for the serotonin 5-HT_{1A} receptor. The drug is a full agonist of the serotonin 5-HT_{2B} and 5-HT_{2C} receptors. It is most potent as a serotonin 5-HT_{2C} receptor agonist, whereas it shows far lower potency as an agonist of the serotonin 5-HT_{2B} receptor than as an agonist of the serotonin 5-HT_{2A} and 5-HT_{2C} receptors. DOAM shows very low potency as a human trace amine-associated receptor 1 (TAAR1) agonist. It does not bind to the monoamine transporters. Other receptor interactions have also been described.

The drug produces the head-twitch response, a behavioral proxy of psychedelic effects, in rodents. However, it produces only a weak head-twitch response and is less potent and much less efficacious than DOM in this regard. In addition, DOAM fails to substitute for DOM in rodent drug discrimination tests, producing up to 35% responding followed up behavioral disruption at higher doses. It was also unable to antagonize the DOM stimulus at the assessed doses, and behavioral disruption at higher doses prevented further assessment. Other effects of DOAM in rodents include hyperlocomotion at lower doses, hypolocomotion at higher doses, and hypothermia at higher doses.

As the 4-alkyl chain length in DOx is increased from shorter homologues such as DOM, DOET and DOPR which are all potent hallucinogens, the serotonin 5-HT_{2} receptor binding affinity increases, rising to a maximum with DOHx before falling again with even longer chains. Compounds with sufficiently long chains, such as DOAM, or with bulky groups such as DOTB, have reduced or absent psychedelic-type effects in animals and/or humans, suggesting that they may have reduced agonistic activity at the serotonin 5-HT_{2A} receptor.

== Chemistry ==
=== Synthesis ===
The chemical synthesis of DOAM has been described.

=== Analogues ===
Analogues of DOAM include 2,5-dimethoxyamphetamine (2,5-DMA), DOM, DOET, DOPR, DOBU, and DOHx, among others.

== History ==
DOAM was first described in the scientific literature by Alexander Shulgin and colleagues in 1975. Subsequently, it was described in greater detail by Shulgin in his 1991 book PiHKAL (Phenethylamines I Have Known and Loved).

== Society and culture ==
=== Legal status ===
==== Canada ====
DOAM is a controlled substance in Canada under phenethylamine blanket-ban language.

== See also ==
- DOx (psychedelics)
- 2,5-Dimethoxy-4-butylamphetamine (DOBU)
- 2,5-Dimethoxy-4-hexylamphetamine (DOHx)
