= Open-chain compound =

Type of organic molecule with a linear structure

In chemistry, an open-chain compound (or open chain compound) or acyclic compound (Greek prefix α 'without' and κύκλος 'cycle') is a compound with a linear structure, rather than a cyclic one. An open-chain compound having no side groups is called a straight-chain compound (also spelled as straight chain compound). Many of the simple molecules of organic chemistry, such as the alkanes and alkenes, have both linear and ring isomers, that is, both acyclic and cyclic. For those with 4 or more carbons, the linear forms can have straight-chain or branched-chain isomers. The lowercase prefix n- denotes the straight-chain isomer; for example, n-butane is straight-chain butane, whereas i-butane is isobutane. Cycloalkanes are isomers of alkenes, not of alkanes, because the ring's closure involves a C-C bond. Having no rings (aromatic or otherwise), all open-chain compounds are aliphatic.

Typically in biochemistry, some isomers are more prevalent than others. For example, in living organisms, the open-chain isomer of glucose usually exists only transiently, in small amounts; D-glucose is the usual isomer; and L-glucose is rare.

Straight-chain molecules are often not literally straight, in the sense that their bond angles are often not 180°, but the name reflects that they are schematically straight. For example, the straight-chain alkanes are wavy or "puckered", as the models below show.

branched-chain	straight-chain	cyclic
open-chain

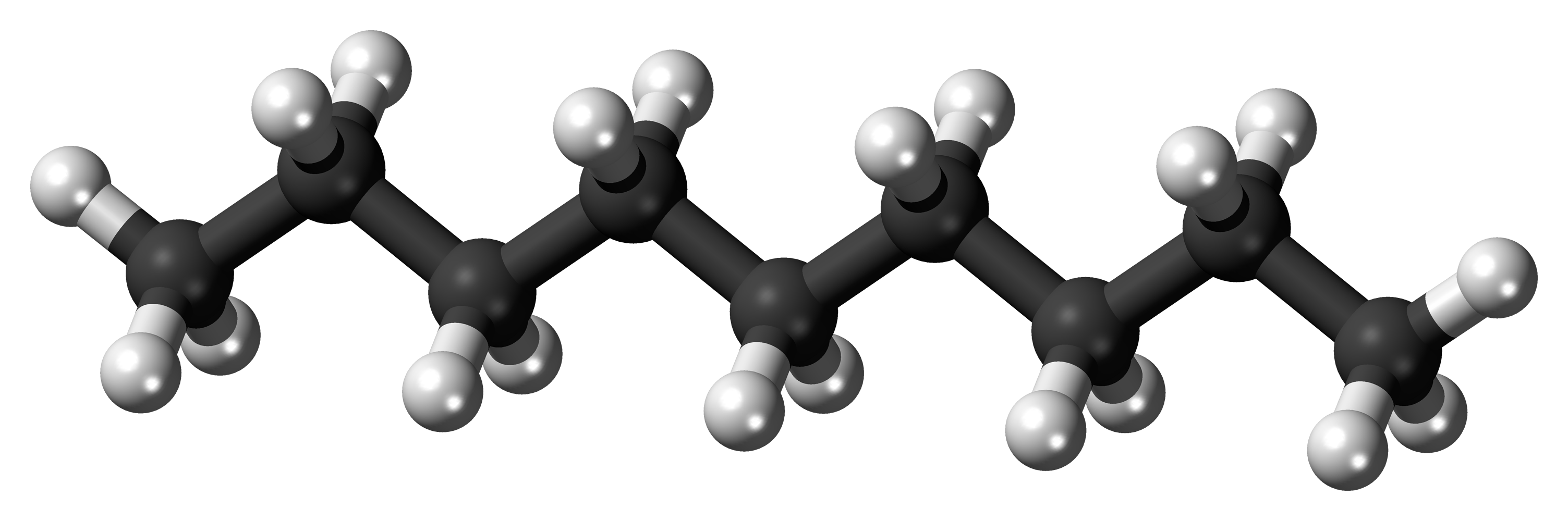
n-Nonane

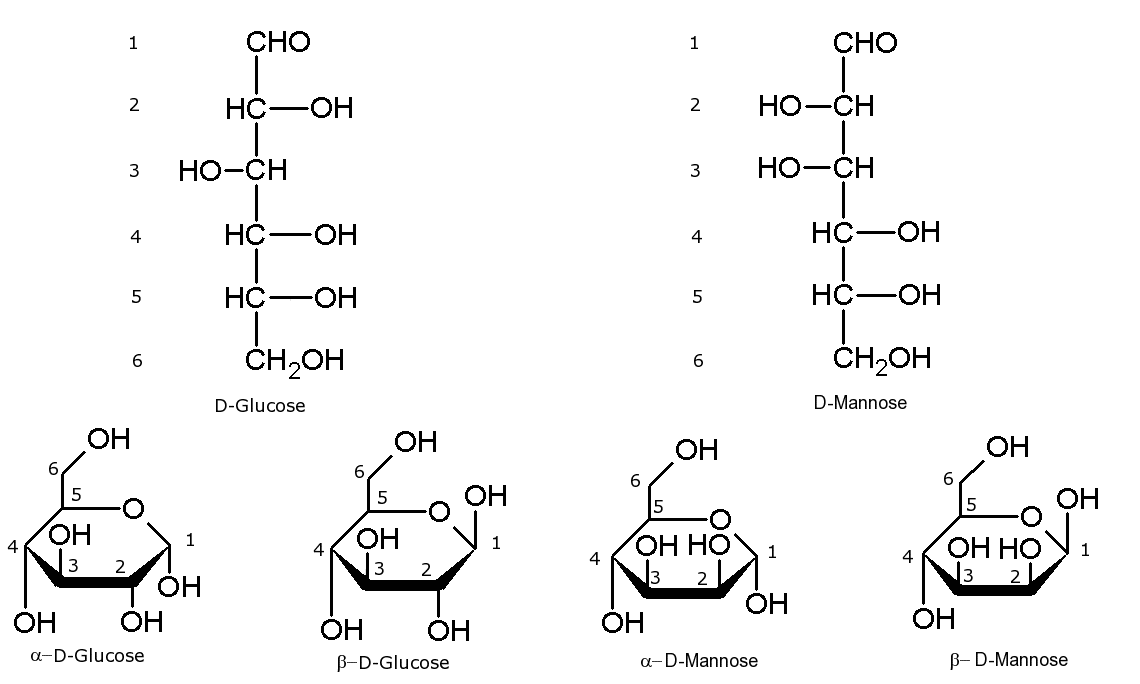
The top row shows the open-chain forms of glucose and mannose. The lower row shows the cyclic forms.
