= 2,5-Dimethoxy-4-propylamphetamine =

Psychedelic drug

DOPR

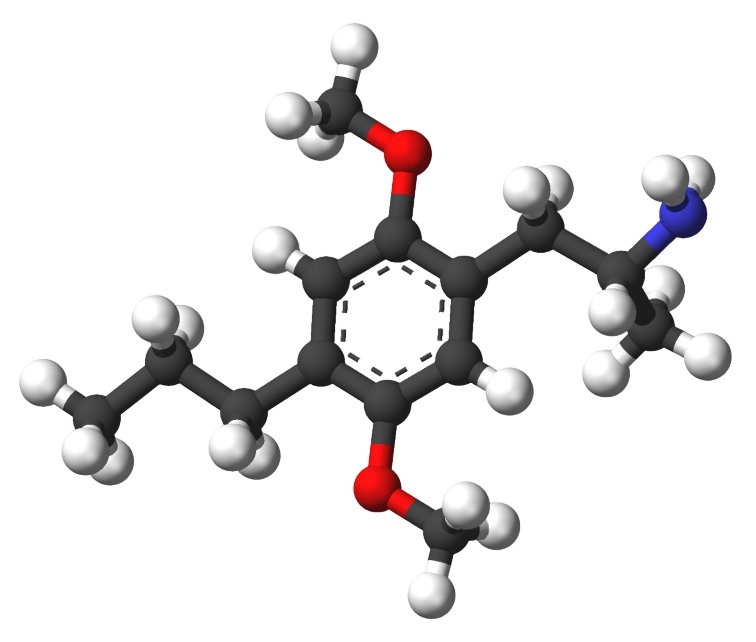

Clinical data
- Other names: 2,5-Dimethoxy-4-propylamphetamine; 4-Propyl-2,5-dimethoxyamphetamine; DOPR; DOPr
- Routes of administration: Oral
- Drug class: Serotonin receptor agonist; Serotonin 5-HT_{2} receptor agonist; Serotonin 5-HT_{2A} receptor agonist; Serotonergic psychedelic; Hallucinogen
- ATC code: None

Legal status
- Legal status: CA: Schedule I; DE: NpSG (Industrial and scientific use only); UK: Class A

Pharmacokinetic data
- Onset of action: Very slow
- Duration of action: 20–30 hours

Identifiers
- IUPAC name: 1-(2,5-dimethoxy-4-propylphenyl)propan-2-amine
- CAS Number: 63779-88-4 53581-55-8 (hydrochloride)
- PubChem CID: 542051
- ChemSpider: 472021
- UNII: L3P287BI9W
- ChEMBL: ChEMBL8569
- CompTox Dashboard (EPA): DTXSID40337347

Chemical and physical data
- Formula: C_{14}H_{23}NO_{2}
- Molar mass: 237.343 g·mol^{−1}
- 3D model (JSmol): Interactive image
- SMILES: CCCC1=CC(=C(C=C1OC)CC(C)N)OC
- InChI: InChI=1S/C15H25NO2/c1-5-6-11-8-14(17-4)12(7-10(2)15)9-13(11)16-3/h8-10H,5-7,15H2,1-4H3; Key:UEEAUFJYLUJWQJ-UHFFFAOYSA-N

2,5-Dimethoxy-4-propylamphetamine (DOPR) is a psychedelic drug of the phenethylamine, amphetamine, and DOx families related to DOM. It is the derivative of DOM in which the methyl group at the 4 position has been replaced with a propyl group. The drug is taken orally.

The drug acts as a serotonin receptor agonist, including of the serotonin 5-HT_{2A} receptor. It produces psychedelic-like effects in animals.

DOPR was first described in the literature by Alexander Shulgin in 1970. Subsequently, it was described in greater detail by Shulgin in his 1991 book PiHKAL (Phenethylamines I Have Known and Loved).

== Use and effects ==
In his book PiHKAL (Phenethylamines I Have Known and Loved), Alexander Shulgin lists DOPR's dose as 2.5 to 5 mg orally and its duration as 20 to 30 hours. It is said to have a very slow onset. The effects of DOPR have been reported to include closed-eye imagery, visuals, thinking changes, and insomnia and sleep disruption, among others. In one of the reports, it was described as a "heavy duty psychedelic", including strong and unignorable visuals.

== Pharmacology ==
=== Pharmacodynamics ===
DOPR acts as an agonist of the serotonin 5-HT_{2} receptors, including of the serotonin 5-HT_{2A}, 5-HT_{2B}, and 5-HT_{2C} receptors. It has very weak affinity for the serotonin 5-HT_{1} receptor. The drug has also been assessed at other receptors.

It produces the head-twitch response (HTR), a behavioral proxy of psychedelic effects, in rodents. It is slightly more potent but slightly less efficacious than DOM in producing the head-twitch response. As with many other psychedelics, DOPR shows an inverted U-shaped dose–response curve in terms of the HTR, increasing it at lower doses and having diminished effectiveness at higher doses.

DOPR showed no significant effects on locomotor activity in rodents at the assessed doses, but showed a trend towards hyperlocomotion at the highest dose. In a subsequent study however, it produced hyperlocomotion at lower doses and hypolocomotion at higher doses. The drug has shown pro-motivational effects in rodents at sub-hallucinogenic doses or so-called "microdoses". DOPR's close analogue DOET has also been clinically studied at sub-hallucinogenic doses as a "psychic energizer". DOPR produces antidepressant-like effects in rodents.

At higher doses, DOPR produces hypothermia in rodents.

=== Pharmacokinetics ===
DOPR crosses the blood–brain barrier in rodents. The drug showed the highest brain/plasma ratio among DOM homologues in rodents, whereas 2,5-dimethoxyamphetamine (2,5-DMA) showed the lowest. This was involved in potency differences between the drugs.

== Chemistry ==
=== Synthesis ===
The chemical synthesis of DOPR has been described.

=== Analogues ===
Analogues of DOPR include DOM, DOET, DOiP, DOBU, DOAM, DOPF, 2C-P, and 4C-P, among others.

== History ==
DOPR was first described in the literature by Alexander Shulgin in 1970. Subsequently, it was described in greater detail by Shulgin in his 1991 book PiHKAL (Phenethylamines I Have Known and Loved).

== Society and culture ==
=== Legal status ===
==== Canada ====
DOPR is a controlled substance in Canada under phenethylamine blanket-ban language.

==== United States ====
DOPR is not an explicitly controlled substance in the United States. However, it could be considered a controlled substance under the Federal Analogue Act if intended for human consumption.

== See also ==
- DOx (psychedelics)
- Stimulant § Serotonin 5-HT_{2A} receptor agonists
- Motivation-enhancing drug § Serotonin 5-HT_{2A} receptor agonists
- ASR-2001
- DOPF
- Ariadne
