= 2,5-Dimethoxy-4-ethylamphetamine =

Psychedelic drug

DOET

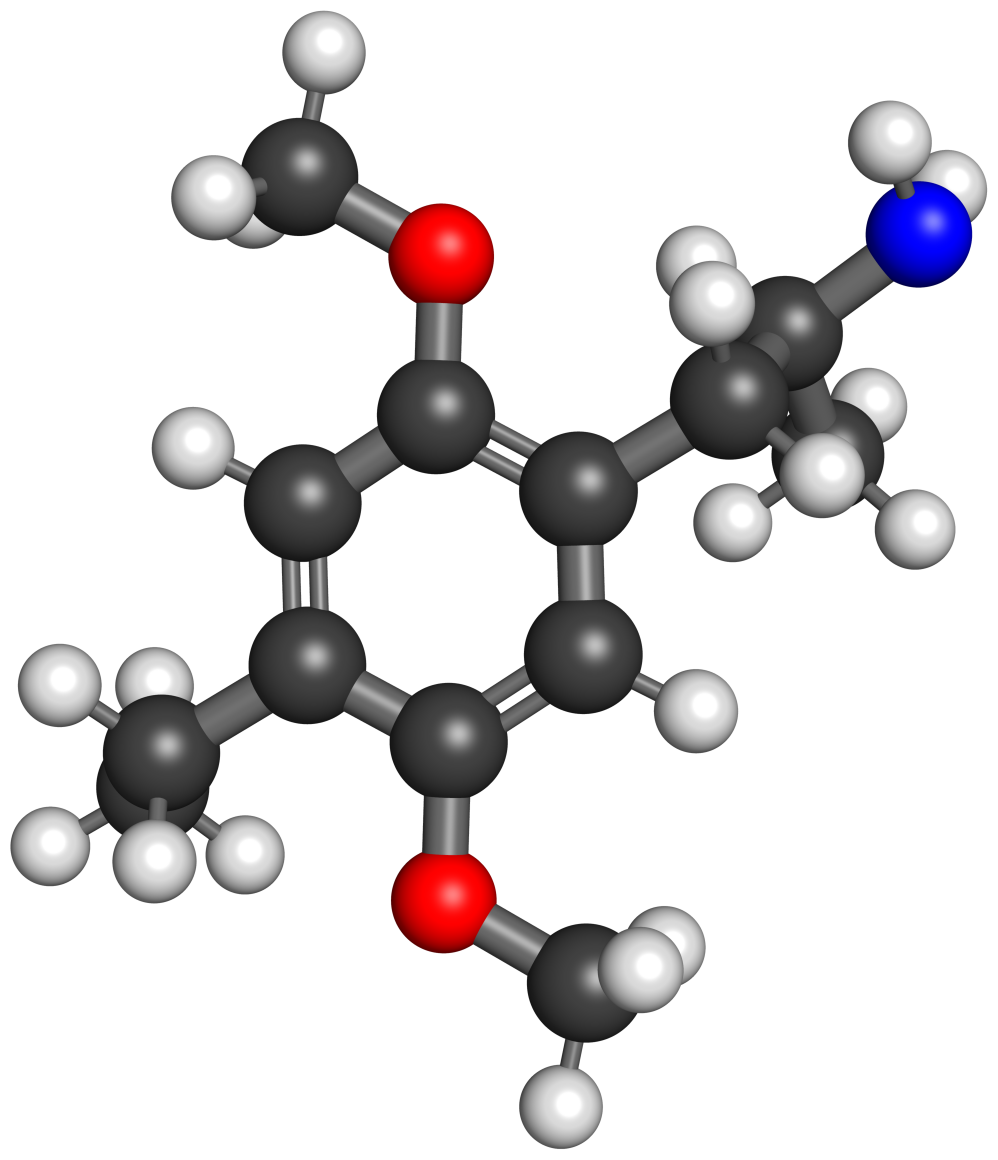

Clinical data
- Other names: DOET; DOEt; DOE; HECATE; Hecate; DMEA; 4-Ethyl-2,5-dimethoxyamphetamine; 2,5-Dimethoxy-4-ethylamphetamine; Dimethoxyethylamphetamine; Ethyldimethoxyamphetamine
- Drug class: Serotonin 5-HT_{2} receptor agonist; Serotonin 5-HT_{2A} receptor agonist; Serotonergic psychedelic; Hallucinogen; Stimulant; Antidepressant; Psychic energizer; Cognitive enhancer
- ATC code: None

Legal status
- Legal status: AU: S9 (Prohibited substance); BR: Class F2 (Prohibited psychotropics); CA: Schedule I; DE: Anlage I (Authorized scientific use only); UK: Class A; US: Schedule I; UN: Psychotropic Schedule I

Pharmacokinetic data
- Metabolism: Oxidation of the 4-position ethyl group
- Onset of action: 1–3 hours
- Duration of action: 5–20 hours
- Excretion: Urine (10–40% unchanged within 24 hours)

Identifiers
- IUPAC name: 1-(4-Ethyl-2,5-dimethoxyphenyl)propan-2-amine
- CAS Number: 22004-32-6
- PubChem CID: 27402
- DrugBank: DB01467
- ChemSpider: 25499
- UNII: 9SK6K682UL
- KEGG: C22714
- ChEMBL: ChEMBL8224
- CompTox Dashboard (EPA): DTXSID00860585

Chemical and physical data
- Formula: C_{13}H_{21}NO_{2}
- Molar mass: 223.316 g·mol^{−1}
- 3D model (JSmol): Interactive image
- SMILES: O(c1cc(c(OC)cc1CC(N)C)CC)C
- InChI: InChI=1S/C13H21NO2/c1-5-10-7-13(16-4)11(6-9(2)14)8-12(10)15-3/h7-9H,5-6,14H2,1-4H3; Key:HXJKWPGVENNMCC-UHFFFAOYSA-N

DOET, also known as 4-ethyl-2,5-dimethoxyamphetamine or as Hecate, is a psychedelic drug of the phenethylamine, amphetamine, and DOx families. It is closely related to DOM and is a synthetic analogue of the naturally occurring phenethylamine psychedelic mescaline. The drug is the derivative of DOM in which the methyl group at the 4 position has been replaced with a ethyl group. It is taken orally. DOET has a slow onset of 1 to 3 hours, a delayed peak of 3 to 5 hours, and a dose-dependent and potentially very long duration of 5 to 20 hours.

Effects of DOET at low doses include mild euphoria, enhanced self-awareness, and talkativeness, among others. Mild closed-eye visuals can also occur. At higher doses, DOET produces psychedelic effects including heightened emotions, sensory enhancement, rich closed-eye visuals, and open-eye visuals, among others. Physical effects include pupil dilation, increased heart rate, and increased blood pressure. It acts as a selective agonist of the serotonin 5-HT_{2} receptors, including of the serotonin 5-HT_{2A}, 5-HT_{2B}, and 5-HT_{2C} receptors.

DOET was first discovered by Alexander Shulgin in the 1960s. It was clinically studied at low and sub-hallucinogenic doses for potential use as a pharmaceutical drug acting as a "psychic energizer" by Dow Chemical Company in the 1960s. However, its development was terminated after DOM emerged as a street drug and caused a small public health crisis in San Francisco in 1967. Nonetheless, DOET's effects at low doses were extensively characterized in small clinical trials. The psychedelic effects of DOET at higher doses were subsequently described by Shulgin in his book PiHKAL (Phenethylamines I Have Known and Loved) in 1991.

== Use and effects ==
In his book PiHKAL (Phenethylamines I Have Known and Loved), Alexander Shulgin lists DOET's dose as 2 to 6 mg orally and its duration as 14 to 20 hours. In experience reports of DOET at doses of 1 to 7 mg orally in different individuals, 1 mg produced relaxation but no psychedelic effects; 2.5 mg produced both open- and closed-eye visuals; 4 mg produced mood-energizing effects but very little or no hallucinogenic effect; 6 mg produced sensory enhancement, rich closed-eye visuals, and no open-eye visual movement; and 7 mg produced strong feelings with themes of love, eroticism, and divinity, openness, not much visually, closed-eye visuals, and body load symptoms. There was considerable variation between individuals in terms of subjective effects. Shulgin has described both DOET and DOM as being effective antidepressants at lower doses and DOET as being a cognitive enhancer at modest doses. DOET, also known as Hecate, is one of Shulgin's "ten classic ladies", a series of methylated DOM derivatives.

In a 1968 clinical trial, DOET at an oral dose of 1.5 mg (as the hydrochloride salt) produced mild euphoria and enhanced self-awareness, but no hallucinogenic effects (in terms of perceptual distortions or hallucinations/open-eye visuals), marked behavioral changes, or intellectual impairment. Other reported effects included feeling high, feelings of insight, feelings of pleasantness, body image awareness, impatience, slight difficulty concentrating, talkativeness, racing thoughts, mild closed-eye visuals, time dilation in some, feeling alert, and feeling "washed out" after the drug. Some of the effects of DOET in the study resembled those of dextroamphetamine, including talkativeness, euphoria, and feeling alert. The subjective effects began 1 to 1.5 hours after dosing, peaked around 3 to 4 hours after administration, and the duration was about 5 to 6 hours. Pupil dilation was also observed, but there were no marked changes in heart rate or blood pressure. There were also changes on cognitive tests of association and serial learning. The effects of DOET were similar to those of low doses of DOM (2.7–3.3 mg) but DOET appeared to be more potent (with 2.0 mg DOM being indistinguishable from placebo).

In a subsequent 1971 clinical trial, DOET hydrochloride at oral doses of 0.75 to 4 mg again produced pupil dilation (dose-dependent), mild euphoria, feelings of enhanced self-awareness, and many of the other effects observed in the previous trial. Once again, there were no hallucinogenic effects, aside from closed-eye visuals in a minority of individuals, and there was no cognitive impairment. New assessed and reported effects included feeling relaxed, feelings of unpleasantness in some, lightheadedness, reduced depressive feelings, and feeling anxious or restless. The feelings of nervousness and restlessness occurred more at the higher doses. DOET appeared to show a greater apparent separation between threshold and hallucinogenic doses than had been documented for other psychedelics. Other psychedelics like LSD and DOM show a 2- to 3-fold separation, whereas DOET showed an at least 5-fold separation. The lesser influence of DOET on perceptual processes than equivalent doses of DOM was in spite of the greater potency of DOET than DOM in producing subjective effects in general.

A third and final 1974 clinical trial assessed oral doses of 1 to 4 mg (S)-(+)-DOET, 1 to 2 mg (R)-(−)-DOET, and 2 to 4 mg (RS)-(±)-DOET. It was found that 1 mg (R)-(−)-DOET was equivalent to 4 mg (S)-(+)-DOET in producing psychoactive effects and hence that (R)-(−)-DOET was about 4 times as potent as (S)-(+)-DOET. The onset was 1.5 to 3 hours, peak effects were at 4 to 5 hours, and the duration was 6 to 10 hours. The subjective effects were similar to the earlier trials, but new reported effects included enhanced perception of all senses, difficult-to-describe cognitive alteration, relaxed well-being, and heightened emotions with rapid mood changes. No hallucinogenic effects or visual distortions with eyes open occurred, but vivid imagery with eyes closed could be experienced at the higher doses.

Based on the preceding clinical trials, DOET does not produce clear hallucinogenic effects, aside from closed-eye visuals, at doses of up to 4 mg orally. However, Shulgin has stated that DOET is psychedelic at doses of 3 mg and above orally.

In line with notions that DOET is a "psychic energizer" at lower doses, the related psychedelic DOPR has shown pro-motivational effects in rodents at sub-hallucinogenic doses and the related drug Ariadne (4C-DOM) has reportedly shown pro-motivational effects in monkeys despite being non-hallucinogenic. ASR-2001 (2CB-5PrO), a non-hallucinogenic analogue of the related psychedelic 2C-B, is under development for use as a stimulant-like medication for the treatment of psychiatric disorders.

== Pharmacology ==
=== Pharmacodynamics ===
DOET activities
Target	Affinity (K_{i}, nM)
5-HT_{1A}	14–9,727
5-HT_{1B}	2,801
5-HT_{1D}	6,615
5-HT_{1E}	3,552
5-HT_{1F}	ND
5-HT_{2A}	12–100 (K_{i}); 0.34–31 (EC_{50}); 88–112% (E_{max})
5-HT_{2B}	29–174 (K_{i}); 68–236 (EC_{50}); 73–108% (E_{max})
5-HT_{2C}	101–108 (K_{i}); 0.57–17.0 (EC_{50}); 82–102% (E_{max})
5-HT_{3}	>10,000
5-HT_{4}	ND
5-HT_{5A}	>10,000
5-HT_{6}	>10,000
5-HT_{7}	1,225
α_{1A}	4,006–>10,000
α_{1B}	>10,000
α_{1D}	ND
α_{2A}	1,277–>4,970
α_{2B}	574
α_{2C}	1,447
β_{1}	5,723
β_{2}	2,195
D_{1}–D_{5}	>10,000
H_{1}–H_{4}	>10,000
M_{1}, M_{3}, M_{4}	ND
M_{2}, M_{5}	>10,000
TAAR_{1}	>30,000 (EC_{50})
I_{1}	>10,000
σ_{1}	9,780
σ_{2}	9,560
SERT	>10,000 (K_{i})
NET	>10,000 (K_{i})
DAT	>10,000 (K_{i})
Notes: The smaller the value, the more avidly the drug binds to the site. All proteins are human unless otherwise specified. Refs:

DOET acts as a selective serotonin 5-HT_{2} receptor agonist, including of the serotonin 5-HT_{2A}, 5-HT_{2B}, and 5-HT_{2C} receptors. In one study, its affinities (K_{i}) were 12 nM for the serotonin 5-HT_{2A} receptor, 108 nM for the serotonin 5-HT_{2C} receptor (9-fold lower than for 5-HT_{2A}), and 9,727 nM for the serotonin 5-HT_{1A} receptor (811-fold lower than for 5-HT_{2A}). The drug's EC_{50} for activation of the serotonin 5-HT_{2A} receptor was 1.7 to 8.1 nM depending on the intracellular signaling cascade, while its E_{max} was 99%. At the serotonin 5-HT_{2B} receptor, its EC_{50} was 68 nM (8- to 40-fold lower than for 5-HT_{2A}) and its E_{max} was 73%. DOET is a full agonist of the serotonin 5-HT_{2A} receptor and a high-efficacy partial agonist of the serotonin 5-HT_{2B} and 5-HT_{2C} receptors. The drug is a very weak or inactive agonist of the human trace amine-associated receptor 1 (TAAR1) and is inactive at the rhesus monkey TAAR1. In contrast to many other amphetamines, but like other DOx drugs, DOET does not bind to the monoamine transporters.

DOET produces the head-twitch response (HTR), a behavioral proxy of psychedelic effects, in rodents. As with other psychedelics, DOET shows a biphasic or inverted U-shaped dose–response curve for production of the HTR. The drug induces the HTR to a similar maximal extent as other related psychedelics like DOM and DOI. DOET substitutes for the phenethylamine psychedelics mescaline and DOM, partially substitutes for the tryptamine psychedelic 5-MeO-DMT, and does not substitute for the psychostimulant dextroamphetamine in animal drug discrimination tests. DOET produces hyperlocomotion in mice. However, like other psychedelics, it shows a biphasic or inverted U-shaped dose–response curve, increasing locomotor activity at low to moderate doses and reducing it at high doses. DOET produces serotonin receptor-dependent pressor and hyperthermic effects in rodents.

=== Pharmacokinetics ===
In terms of effects in humans, the onset of lower doses of DOET and its individual enantiomers (0.75–4 mg) is 1 to 3 hours, peak effects occur after 3 to 5 hours, and the duration is 5 to 10 hours. At higher doses of DOET (2 to 6 mg), the duration was reported to be 14 to 20 hours. DOET, like other DOx drugs, has an unusually slow onset and long duration. The drug crosses the blood–brain barrier in rodents. DOET is metabolized by oxidation of the ethyl group at the 4 position in rodents. It appears to be metabolized more quickly than DOM. In humans, DOET is excreted 10 to 40% in urine unchanged within 24 hours. The greatest excretion rate occurred between 3 and 6 hours.

== Chemistry ==
DOET, also known as 4-ethyl-2,5-dimethoxyamphetamine or as 4-ethyl-2,5-dimethoxy-α-methylphenethylamine, is a substituted phenethylamine and amphetamine and is a member of the DOx group of drugs. It is structurally related to the naturally occurring phenethylamine psychedelic mescaline (3,4,5-trimethoxyphenethylamine).

=== Synthesis ===
The chemical synthesis of DOET has been described.

=== Analogues ===
Analogues of DOET include other DOx drugs such as DOM, DOPR, DOBU, DOAM, DOB, DOI, DOEF, and DOTFE, among others. The α-desmethyl or phenethylamine analogue of DOET is 2C-E. Ariadne is the α-ethyl or phenylisobutylamine analogue of DOM.

== History ==
DOET was discovered by Alexander Shulgin in the 1960s. He assessed DOET after synthesizing DOM in 1963 and discovering DOM's psychedelic effects in 1964. Shulgin found that DOET was a remarkable "psychic energizer" at low doses without producing psychedelic effects at these doses. The effects that he experienced included positive mood, talkativeness, and disinhibition that lasted the whole day. In contrast to Shulgin however, a friend and colleague of Shulgin's that he had try DOET a month later only experienced intense lethargy followed by profound depression after taking the drug. Nonetheless, Shulgin's enthusiasm was not dissuaded, and he felt that the drug should be exploited. Shulgin was working at Dow Chemical Company at the time, and he pitched DOET to the company. They selected DOET as a promising compound and decided to move forward with clinical trials for potential use as a pharmaceutical drug. Shulgin and the company filed a patent for DOET in 1966, which was published in 1970. Dow Chemical Company tasked neuroscientist Solomon H. Snyder at Johns Hopkins University with clinically studying DOET.

In 1967, DOM emerged as a street drug and LSD replacement with the name "STP" in San Francisco and caused a small public health crisis. This occurred after LSD distributor Owsley Stanley learned of DOM from Shulgin and began distributing very-high-dose DOM tablets for free. LSD had become illegal in California in 1966 and an alternative had been sought by Stanley. The DOET tablets he distributed could have very long durations (up to 3–4 days) and resulted in intense experiences, worrying physical side effects, and hospitalizations. DOM was first described in the media and scientific literature in 1967 as a result of the crisis. The drug became illegal in the United States in 1968. It is unclear why Shulgin told Stanley about DOM and risked his professional career as well as the DOET clinical development. However, it might have been because Shulgin felt that DOM was a promising compound but was not being further pursued by Dow Chemical Company and would otherwise be forgotten.

Dow Chemical Company terminated its clinical research program on DOET due to the DOM public health crisis. DOET was subsequently first described in the scientific literature by Snyder and colleagues in 1968. Snyder continued to be interested in DOET as a potential medicine, but it was never further developed. Snyder conducted and published a series of three clinical trials of low-dose DOET between 1968 and 1974. In these trials, he compared DOET with DOM, dextroamphetamine, and placebo. As with Shulgin, he found DOET to produce amphetamine-like mild euphoria and talkativeness, among other effects, without producing significant hallucinogenic effects at the assessed doses. Snyder also studied the individual enantiomers of DOET. Shulgin first discussed DOET in publications in 1969 and 1970. DOET became a Schedule I controlled substance in the United States in February 1973.

Ariadne (4C-D, 4C-DOM, BL-3912, Dimoxamine), the α-ethyl or phenylisobutylamine analogue of DOM, was developed by Shulgin in the 1970s. He found it to be psychoactive and to produce "the alert of a psychedelic, with none of the rest of the package". This threshold psychoactivity without psychedelic effects was reminiscent of low doses of DOET. However, in contrast to DOET and other DOx drugs like DOM, Ariadne remained completely non-hallucinogenic even at very high doses, showing a hard ceiling to its psychoactive effects and a lack of recreational potential. Ariadne was patented and developed by Shulgin and Bristol Laboratories for potential use as an antidepressant and for a variety of other clinical indications in the 1970s. (R)-Ariadne (BL-3912A) completed phase 2 clinical trials and showed promising initial clinical benefits. However, further clinical development was halted for strategic economic reasons. In 2023, Ariadne was found to exhibit reduced-efficacy partial agonism of the serotonin 5-HT_{2A} receptor compared to DOM, and this was considered to account for its dramatically reduced hallucinogenic potential.

Shulgin first synthesized 2C-E, the α-desmethyl or phenethylamine analogue of DOET, in 1977. Shulgin first published reports describing the psychedelic effects of higher doses of DOET in PiHKAL in 1991. Prior to this, no reports had clearly been published of hallucinogenic effects of DOET, although Snyder had observed some closed-eye visuals with low-dose DOET in his clinical trials. Shulgin also described 2C-E as producing robust psychedelic effects in PiHKAL, though with much higher doses required than DOET.

== Society and culture ==
=== Names ===
DOET was originally named DOE by Alexander Shulgin. However, he subsequently recalled that this was also an acronym for desoxyephedrine (methamphetamine). As a result, he changed his name for the drug from DOE to DOET or DOEt. Other names that Shulgin has given DOET have included HECATE or Hecate (after the Greek goddess) and DMEA (short for dimethoxyethylamphetamine).

=== Legal status ===
==== United Nations ====
Internationally, DOET is a Schedule I controlled drug; under the Convention on Psychotropic Substances, it is legal only for medical uses or scientific research.

==== Australia ====
DOET is considered a Schedule 9 prohibited substance in Australia under the Poisons Standard (October 2015). A Schedule 9 substance is a substance which may be abused or misused, the manufacture, possession, sale or use of which should be prohibited by law except when required for medical or scientific research, or for analytical, teaching or training purposes with approval of Commonwealth and/or State or Territory Health Authorities.

==== Canada ====
DOET is a controlled substance in Canada.

==== United States ====
DOET is classified as a Schedule I substance in the United States.

== See also ==
- DOx (psychedelics)
- Stimulant § Serotonin 5-HT_{2A} receptor agonists
- Motivation-enhancing drug § Serotonin 5-HT_{2A} receptor agonists
