= Α-Alkylphenethylamine =

α-Alkylphenethylamine, or a substituted α-alkylphenethylamine, is a phenethylamine with an alkyl group at the alpha (α) carbon and can refer to:

- α-Methylphenethylamine (AMPEA; amphetamine) (and derivatives like methamphetamine, phenylpropanolamine, ephedrine, fenfluramine, cathinone, methcathinone (ephedrone), mephedrone, MDA, MDMA, methylone, TMA, DOM, MPEP, α-PPP, and MDPPP)
- α-Ethylphenethylamine (AEPEA; phenylisobutylamine) (and derivatives like MEPEA, DEPEA, buphedrone, 4-methylbuphedrone, BDB, MBDB, butylone, eutylone, Ariadne (4C-D), 4C-B, AEM, α-PBP, and MDPBP)
- α-Propylphenethylamine (APPEA) (and derivatives like prolintane, pentedrone, PPAP, BDP, MBDP, pentylone, MPAP, NPAP, 5C-D, α-PVP, pyrovalerone, MDPV, and naphyrone)
- α-Butylphenethylamine (ABPEA) (and derivatives like hexedrone, N-ethylhexedrone, hexylone, N-ethylhexylone, α-PHP, and MDPHP)
- α-Pentylphenethylamine (APePEA) (and derivatives like heptedrone, heptylone, N-ethylheptylone, α-PEP, MDPEP, and hexapradol)
- α-Hexylphenethylamine (AHPEA) (and derivatives like octedrone, α-POP, and MDPOP)
- α-Octylphenethylamine (AOPEA) (and derivatives like nonedrone, α-PNP, and MDPNP)

α,α-Dialkylphenethylamines include phentermine (α-methylamphetamine) and its derivatives like mephentermine and chlorphentermine.

== See also ==
- Substituted phenethylamine
- Phenethylamine
- N-Alkylamphetamine
- α-Alkyltryptamine
