= 4C-P =

Clinical data
- Other names: 4C-Pr; 4C-PR; 4C-DOPR; 4C-DOPr; 4-Propyl-2,5-dimethoxy-α-ethylphenethylamine; 2,5-Dimethoxy-4-propyl-α-ethylphenethylamine
- Drug class: Serotonin 5-HT_{2} receptor agonist; Serotonin 5-HT_{2A} receptor agonist
- ATC code: None

Identifiers
- IUPAC name: 1-(2,5-dimethoxy-4-propylphenyl)butan-2-amine
- CAS Number: 72667-81-3
- PubChem CID: 21426718
- ChemSpider: 15468231
- ChEMBL: ChEMBL1194137

Chemical and physical data
- Formula: C_{15}H_{25}NO_{2}
- Molar mass: 251.370 g·mol^{−1}
- 3D model (JSmol): Interactive image
- SMILES: CCCC1=CC(=C(C=C1OC)CC(CC)N)OC
- InChI: InChI=1S/C15H25NO2/c1-5-7-11-9-15(18-4)12(8-13(16)6-2)10-14(11)17-3/h9-10,13H,5-8,16H2,1-4H3; Key:JQUVOKBZTCXBPH-UHFFFAOYSA-N

4C-P, or 4C-Pr, also known as 4C-DOPR, as well as 4-propyl-2,5-dimethoxy-α-ethylphenethylamine, is a serotonin 5-HT_{2} receptor agonist of the phenethylamine, phenylisobutylamine, and 4C families related to Ariadne (4C-D). It is a close analogue of the psychedelic drugs 2C-P and DOPR, with 2C-P having no substitution at the α carbon, DOPR having an α-methyl group, and 4C-P having an α-ethyl group. The drug is a potent agonist of the serotonin 5-HT_{2A}, 5-HT_{2B}, and 5-HT_{2C} receptors. It shows similar efficacy as an agonist of these receptors as Ariadne, but has about 6.2-fold higher potency as a serotonin 5-HT_{2A} receptor agonist in comparison. Like Ariadne, 4C-P produces an attenuated head-twitch response relative to DOPR, with a similar maximal response as Ariadne. The chemical synthesis of 4C-P has been described. 4C-P was patented in 1977 and first described in the scientific literature by Alexander Shulgin and colleagues in 1980. Subsequently, it was described in greater detail by Michael Cunningham and colleagues in 2023.

== See also ==
- 4C (psychedelics)
