= 4-Chlorophenylisobutylamine =

Entactogen and stimulant drug of the phenethylamine class

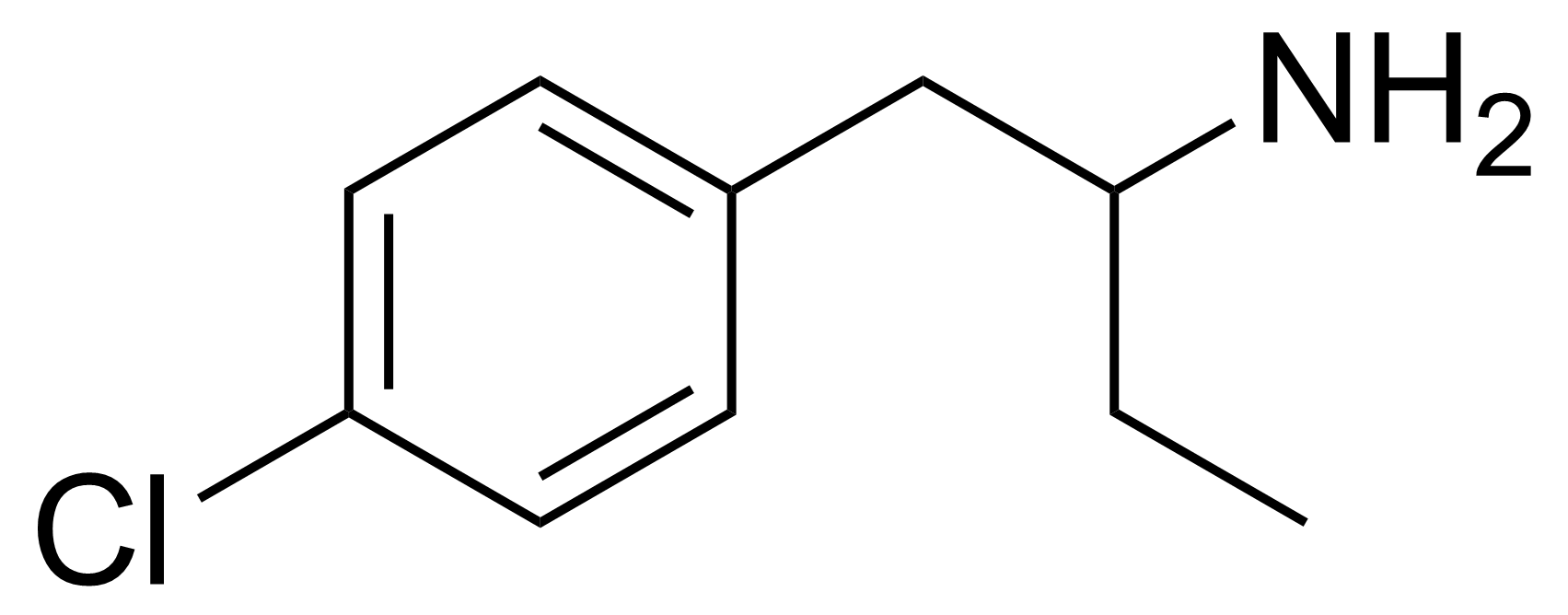

Clinical data
- Routes of administration: Oral
- ATC code: none

Legal status
- Legal status: Uncontrolled (but may be covered under the Federal Analogue Act in the United States and under similar bills in other countries)

Identifiers
- IUPAC name: 1-(4-chlorophenyl)butan-2-amine
- CAS Number: 2275-64-1
- PubChem CID: 150989
- ChemSpider: 133083
- UNII: LJ4HK7485X
- CompTox Dashboard (EPA): DTXSID30945430

Chemical and physical data
- Formula: C_{10}H_{14}ClN
- Molar mass: 183.68 g·mol^{−1}
- 3D model (JSmol): Interactive image
- SMILES: Clc1ccc(cc1)CC(N)CC
- InChI: InChI=1S/C10H14ClN/c1-2-10(12)7-8-3-5-9(11)6-4-8/h3-6,10H,2,7,12H2,1H3; Key:BDZUAWTZJXBMLX-UHFFFAOYSA-N

4-Chlorophenylisobutylamine (4-CAB, AEPCA), also known as 4-chloro-α-ethylphenethylamine, is an entactogen and stimulant drug of the phenethylamine, amphetamine, and phenylisobutylamine families. It is an analogue of para-chloroamphetamine (PCA) where the alpha position methyl has been replaced with an ethyl group.

In comparison to PCA, 4-CAB is approximately 2- and 5-fold less potent at inhibiting the reuptake of serotonin (IC_{50} = 330 nM) and dopamine (IC_{50} = 2,343 nM), respectively, and is about 3-fold less potent in substituting for MDMA in animals in drug discrimination assays. Though its dopaminergic activity is significantly attenuated compared to PCA, unlike the case of MBDB, it is not abolished, and is actually similar to that of MDMA.

Relative to PCA, 4-CAB is also substantially less effective as a serotonergic neurotoxin. A single 10 mg/kg administration of PCA to rats produces an approximate 80% decrease in serotonin markers as observed 1 week later. In contrast, 11 mg/kg and 22 mg/kg doses of 4-CAB result in only 20% and 50% decreases, respectively. This is once again similar to MDMA which causes a 40-60% reduction with a single 20 mg/kg dose.

== See also ==
- Phenylisobutylamine
- 4-Methylphenylisobutylamine
