= 4C-TFM =

Clinical data
- Other names: TFM-Ariadne; 4C-DOTFM; 4-Trifluoromethyl-2,5-dimethoxy-α-ethylphenethylamine; 2,5-Dimethoxy-4-trifluoromethyl-α-ethylphenethylamine
- Drug class: Serotonin 5-HT_{2} receptor agonist; Serotonin 5-HT_{2A} receptor agonist
- ATC code: None

Identifiers
- IUPAC name: 1-[2,5-dimethoxy-4-(trifluoromethyl)phenyl]butan-2-amine
- PubChem CID: 167243550

Chemical and physical data
- Formula: C_{13}H_{18}F_{3}NO_{2}
- Molar mass: 277.287 g·mol^{−1}
- 3D model (JSmol): Interactive image
- SMILES: CCC(CC1=CC(=C(C=C1OC)C(F)(F)F)OC)N
- InChI: InChI=1S/C13H18F3NO2/c1-4-9(17)5-8-6-12(19-3)10(13(14,15)16)7-11(8)18-2/h6-7,9H,4-5,17H2,1-3H3; Key:KJEMUKCPDLOVTI-UHFFFAOYSA-N

4C-TFM, also known as TFM-Ariadne or 4C-DOTFM, as well as 4-trifluoromethyl-2,5-dimethoxy-α-ethylphenethylamine, is a serotonin 5-HT_{2} receptor agonist of the phenethylamine, phenylisobutylamine, and 4C families related to Ariadne (4C-D). It is a close analogue of the psychedelic drugs 2C-TFM and DOTFM, with 2C-TFM having no substitution at the α carbon, DOTFM having an α-methyl group, and 4C-TFM having an α-ethyl group. The drug is a potent agonist of the serotonin 5-HT_{2A}, 5-HT_{2B}, and 5-HT_{2C} receptors. It shows similar efficacy as an agonist of these receptors as Ariadne, but shows about 6.4-fold higher potency as a serotonin 5-HT_{2A} receptor agonist in comparison. Like Ariadne, 4C-TFM produces an attenuated head-twitch response relative to the psychedelic drug DOPR, with a similar maximal response as Ariadne. The chemical synthesis of 4C-TFM has been described. 4C-TFM was first described in the scientific literature by Michael Cunningham and colleagues in 2023.

== See also ==
- 4C (psychedelics)
