= 4C-I =

Clinical data
- Other names: Iodo-Ariadne; 4C-DOI; DOI-B; 4-Iodo-2,5-dimethoxy-α-ethylphenethylamine; 2,5-Dimethoxy-4-iodo-α-ethylphenethylamine
- Routes of administration: Oral
- Drug class: Serotonin 5-HT_{2} receptor agonist; Serotonin 5-HT_{2A} receptor agonist
- ATC code: None

Identifiers
- IUPAC name: 1-(4-iodo-2,5-dimethoxyphenyl)butan-2-amine
- PubChem CID: 44288588
- ChemSpider: 25047981

Chemical and physical data
- Formula: C_{12}H_{18}INO_{2}
- Molar mass: 335.185 g·mol^{−1}
- 3D model (JSmol): Interactive image
- SMILES: CCC(CC1=CC(=C(C=C1OC)I)OC)N
- InChI: InChI=1S/C12H18INO2/c1-4-9(14)5-8-6-12(16-3)10(13)7-11(8)15-2/h6-7,9H,4-5,14H2,1-3H3; Key:KQTCNDCMXMIDEQ-UHFFFAOYSA-N

4C-I, also known as iodo-Ariadne, 4C-DOI, or DOI-B, as well as 4-iodo-2,5-dimethoxy-α-ethylphenethylamine, is a serotonin 5-HT_{2} receptor agonist of the phenethylamine, phenylisobutylamine, and 4C families related to Ariadne (4C-D). It is a close analogue of the psychedelic drugs 2C-I and DOI, with 2C-I having no substitution at the α carbon, DOI having an α-methyl group, and 4C-I having an α-ethyl group. In his 1991 book PiHKAL (Phenethylamines I Have Known and Loved), Alexander Shulgin described testing 4C-I at doses of up to 4 mg orally, but observed no effects and did not assess higher doses. The drug is a potent agonist of the serotonin 5-HT_{2A} receptor. It shows similar efficacy as an agonist of this receptor as Ariadne, but has 12- to 16-fold higher activational potency in comparison. Like Ariadne, 4C-I produces an attenuated head-twitch response relative to the psychedelic drug DOPR, with a similar maximal response as Ariadne. The chemical synthesis of 4C-I has been described. 4C-I first described in the scientific literature by Alexander Shulgin and colleagues in 1977. Subsequently, it was described in greater detail by Michael Cunningham and colleagues in 2023.

== See also ==
- 4C (psychedelics)
