= 4'-Methoxy-α-pyrrolidinopropiophenone =

Stimulant recreational drug

MOPPP

Clinical data
- Routes of administration: By mouth, insufflation, vaporization, IV

Legal status
- Legal status: CA: Schedule I; DE: NpSG (Industrial and scientific use only); UK: Class B

Identifiers
- IUPAC name: (RS)-1-(4-Methoxyphenyl)-2-(1-pyrrolidinyl)-1-propanone
- CAS Number: 478243-09-3
- PubChem CID: 6430836
- ChemSpider: 4936174
- UNII: OI15TPX8QP
- CompTox Dashboard (EPA): DTXSID701023585

Chemical and physical data
- Formula: C_{14}H_{19}NO_{2}
- Molar mass: 233.311 g·mol^{−1}
- 3D model (JSmol): Interactive image
- Chirality: Racemic mixture
- SMILES: C2CCCN2C(C)C(=O)c(cc1)ccc1OC
- InChI: InChI=1S/C14H19NO2/c1-11(15-9-3-4-10-15)14(16)12-5-7-13(17-2)8-6-12/h5-8,11H,3-4,9-10H2,1-2H3; Key:QJWOQBGBEFNYKB-UHFFFAOYSA-N

4'-Methoxy-α-pyrrolidinopropiophenone (MOPPP) is a stimulant designer drug of the pyrrolidinophenone class. It has the potential to produce euphoria, an effect shared with other classical stimulants.

== Recreational use ==
MOPPP use is infrequent when compared to other amphetamines or stimulants used recreationally, such as meth, cocaine, or speed. It first arose as a designer drug in Germany in the late 1990s and early 2000s, along with a number of other derivatives but never gained the international popularity that other drugs in its family of pyrrolidinophenone derivatives had (such as α-PPP and MDPV).

While the recent trend of selling stimulants through false labeling (i.e., bath salts) has gained notoriety, using MDPV as its main ingredient, this has not been the case with MOPPP, despite its similar potential for abuse.

== Chemistry ==
MOPPP is structurally related to α-PPP in the same way that PMA is related to amphetamine: a methoxy group has been added to the 4-position on the phenyl ring.

Comparison of similar molecular structure

MOPPP

α-PPP

PMA

Amphetamine

== Metabolism ==
MOPPP appears to be metabolized within the liver chiefly by the enzyme CYP2D6.

== See also ==
- α-Pyrrolidinopropiophenone (α-PPP)
- 4'-Methyl-α-pyrrolidinopropiophenone (MPPP)
- 3,4-Methylenedioxy-α-pyrrolidinopropiophenone (MDPPP)
- 3',4'-Methylenedioxy-α-pyrrolidinobutiophenone (MDPBP)
- Methylenedioxymethamphetamine (MDMA) or Ecstasy, Molly
- Trifluoromethylphenylpiperazine (TMPPP)
