= Ethylic =

Ethylic is an adjective for a molecule containing an ethyl group. It may refer to:

- Ethylic acid, also known as acetic acid
- Ethylic alcohol, also known as ethanol
