= C12H18INO2 =

The molecular formula C_{12}H_{18}INO_{2} (molar mass: 335.185 g/mol) may refer to:

- N-Methyl-DOI
- 4C-I
