= C13H18F3NO2 =

The molecular formula C_{13}H_{18}F_{3}NO_{2} (molar mass: 277.287 g/mol) may refer to:

- DOTFE
- 4C-TFM
