= 5C-D =

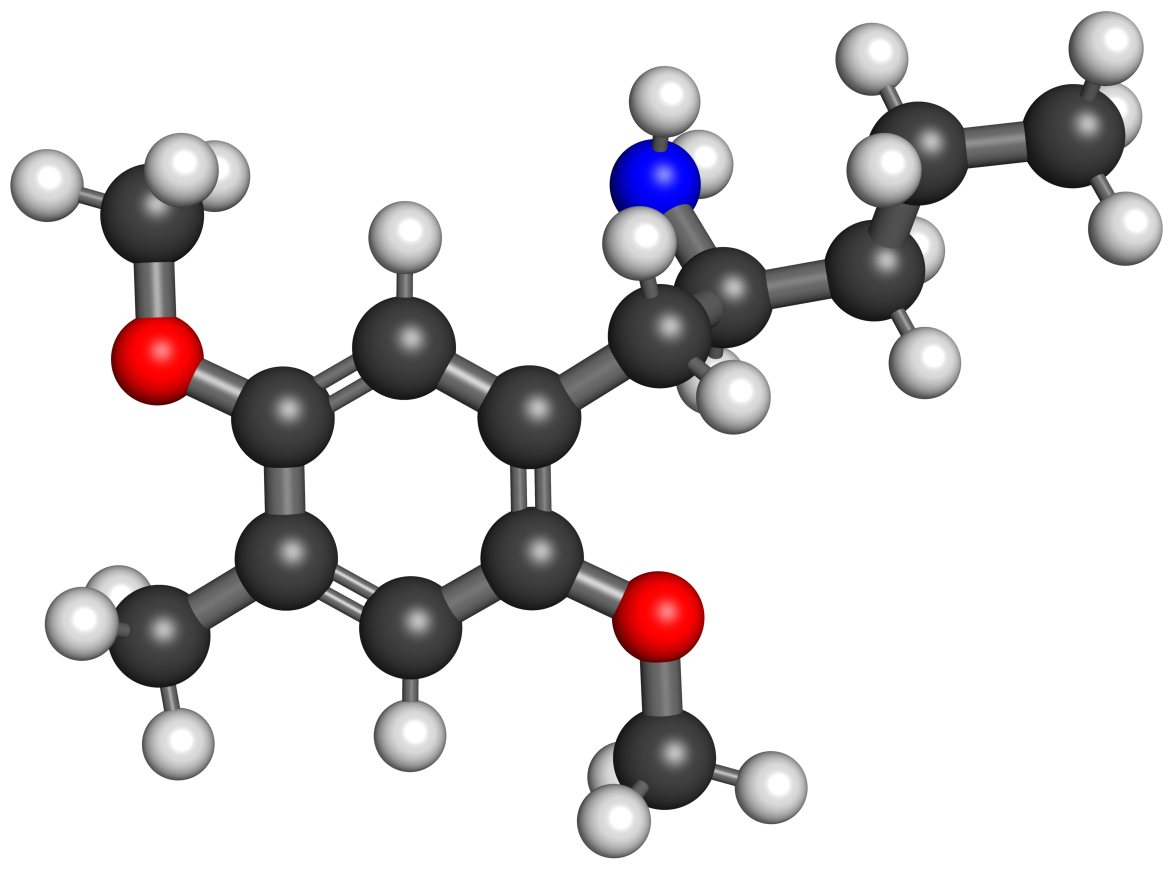

Clinical data
- Other names: 4-Methyl-2,5-dimethoxy-α-propylphenethylamine; 2,5-Dimethoxy-4-methyl-α-propylphenethylamine; α-Propyl-Ariadne; 5C-DOM; α-Propyl-2C-D
- Drug class: Serotonin 5-HT_{2} receptor agonist
- ATC code: None

Identifiers
- IUPAC name: 1-(2,5-dimethoxy-4-methylphenyl)pentan-2-amine
- CAS Number: 2841628-14-4
- PubChem CID: 171417407

Chemical and physical data
- Formula: C_{14}H_{23}NO_{2}
- Molar mass: 237.343 g·mol^{−1}
- 3D model (JSmol): Interactive image
- SMILES: CCCC(CC1=C(C=C(C(=C1)OC)C)OC)N
- InChI: InChI=1S/C14H23NO2/c1-5-6-12(15)8-11-9-13(16-3)10(2)7-14(11)17-4/h7,9,12H,5-6,8,15H2,1-4H3; Key:VZEDHPXICDLLDV-UHFFFAOYSA-N

5C-D, also known as 4-methyl-2,5-dimethoxy-α-propylphenethylamine, is a putatively non-hallucinogenic serotonin 5-HT_{2} receptor agonist of the phenethylamine and α-propylphenethylamine families related to the 4C drug Ariadne (4C-D).

At the serotonin 5-HT_{2A} receptor, 5C-D is a potent and higher-efficacy partial agonist, with an EC_{50} of 291 nM and an E_{max} of 69%. It is about half as potent as Ariadne as a serotonin 5-HT_{2A} receptor agonist and has about 15% lower efficacy in activating the receptor in comparison. 5C-D has also been shown to be a serotonin 5-HT_{2B} receptor agonist. In contrast to Ariadne and serotonergic psychedelics, 5C-D does not produce the head-twitch response, a behavioral proxy of psychedelic effects, in rodents.

5C-D was first described in the scientific literature by Michael Cunningham and colleagues by 2023. It was synthesized and assessed during structure–activity relationship (SAR) studies of Ariadne.

== See also ==
- Substituted methoxyphenethylamine
- Non-hallucinogenic 5-HT_{2A} receptor agonist
- 4C and Ariadne (4C-D)
- α-Propylmescaline (APM)
