= 4C-T-2 =

Chemical compound

Clinical data
- Other names: 4-Ethylthio-2,5-dimethoxy-α-ethylphenethylamine
- ATC code: None

Legal status
- Legal status: In general: uncontrolled

Identifiers
- IUPAC name: 1-[(2,5-dimethoxy-4-ethylthio)phenyl]butan-2-amine
- CAS Number: 850007-13-5 849919-79-5 (hydrochloride)
- PubChem CID: 11197523
- ChemSpider: 9372592
- UNII: AY9HDQ4A2H
- ChEMBL: ChEMBL372719
- CompTox Dashboard (EPA): DTXSID001029306

Chemical and physical data
- Formula: C_{14}H_{23}NO_{2}S
- Molar mass: 269.40 g·mol^{−1}
- 3D model (JSmol): Interactive image
- SMILES: COC1=C(CC(CC)N)C=C(OC)C(SCC)=C1
- InChI: InChI=1S/C14H23NO2S/c1-5-11(15)7-10-8-13(17-4)14(18-6-2)9-12(10)16-3/h8-9,11H,5-7,15H2,1-4H3; Key:KLAWPCIXPDTGCZ-UHFFFAOYSA-N

4C-T-2, also known as 2,5-dimethoxy-4-ethylthio-α-ethylphenethylamine, is a synthetic drug of the phenethylamine, phenylisobutylamine, and 4C families. It is the α-ethylated analogue of 2C-T-2.

== Pharmacology ==
=== Pharmacodynamics ===
4C-T-2 activities
Target	Affinity (K_{i}, nM)
5-HT_{1A}	5,339
5-HT_{1B}	>10,000
5-HT_{1D}	>10,000
5-HT_{1E}	9,879
5-HT_{1F}	ND
5-HT_{2A}	274 (K_{i}); 13.1–53 (EC_{50}); 78% (E_{max})
5-HT_{2B}	58.1 (K_{i}); 630 (EC_{50}); ND (E_{max})
5-HT_{2C}	469 (K_{i}); 7.3–13.2 (EC_{50}); 86–121% (E_{max})
5-HT_{3}	>10,000
5-HT_{4}	ND
5-HT_{5A}	1,587
5-HT_{6}	>10,000
5-HT_{7}	3,829
α_{1A}, α_{1B}	>10,000
α_{1D}	ND
α_{2A}–α_{2C}	>10,000
β_{1}	>10,000
β_{2}	124.9
β_{3}	ND
D_{1}, D_{2}	>10,000
D_{3}	1,273
D_{4}, D_{5}	>10,000
H_{1}–H_{4}	>10,000
M_{1}–M_{5}	>10,000
I_{1}	946.5
σ_{1}	514.6
σ_{2}	>10,000
TAAR1	ND
SERT	>10,000 (K_{i})
NET	>10,000 (K_{i})
DAT	>10,000 (K_{i})
MAO-A	11,800 (IC_{50})
MAO-B	>100,000 (IC_{50})
Notes: The smaller the value, the more avidly the drug binds to the site. All proteins are human unless otherwise specified. Refs:

4C-T-2 acts as a serotonin 5-HT_{2} receptor agonist, including of the serotonin 5-HT_{2A}, 5-HT_{2B}, and 5-HT_{2C} receptors.

== History ==
4C-T-2 was first described in the scientific literature by at least 2005. It was more fully characterized in 2010 and then in 2023.

== See also ==
- 2C-T-2
- 4C-B
- Aleph-7
- Ariadne
