= MBDB =

Chemical compound

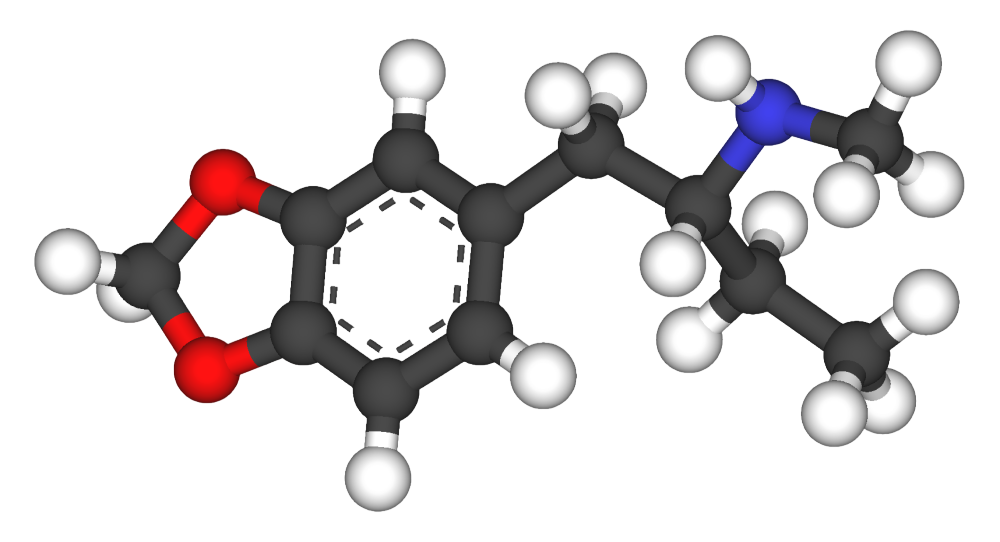

Clinical data
- Other names: Methylbenzodioxolyl-butanamine; N-Methyl-1,3-benzodioxolylbutanamine; MBDB; 3,4-Methylenedioxy-N-methyl-butanphenamine; MDMB; 1,3-Benzodioxolyl-N-methylbutanamine; BDMB; 3,4-Methylenedioxy-N-methyl-α-ethylphenylethylamine; 3,4-Methylenedioxy-N-methyl-α-desmethyl-α-ethylamphetamine; Eden; Methyl-J
- Routes of administration: Oral
- Drug class: Serotonin–norepinephrine releasing agent; Entactogen; Serotonergic neurotoxin

Legal status
- Legal status: AU: S9 (Prohibited substance); DE: Anlage I (Authorized scientific use only); UK: Class A; US: Schedule I (Positional Isomer of MDEA)

Pharmacokinetic data
- Duration of action: 4–8 hours

Identifiers
- IUPAC name: 1-(1,3-Benzodioxol-5-yl)-N-methylbutan-2-amine
- CAS Number: 135795-90-3
- PubChem CID: 124844
- ChemSpider: 111153
- UNII: E8HMQ4F9JQ
- KEGG: C22786
- ChEMBL: ChEMBL268689
- CompTox Dashboard (EPA): DTXSID70894039
- ECHA InfoCard: 100.229.798

Chemical and physical data
- Formula: C_{12}H_{17}NO_{2}
- Molar mass: 207.273 g·mol^{−1}
- 3D model (JSmol): Interactive image
- Melting point: 156 °C (313 °F)
- SMILES: CCC(CC1=CC2=C(C=C1)OCO2)NC
- InChI: InChI=1S/C12H17NO2/c1-3-10(13-2)6-9-4-5-11-12(7-9)15-8-14-11/h4-5,7,10,13H,3,6,8H2,1-2H3; Key:USWVWJSAJAEEHQ-UHFFFAOYSA-N

MBDB, also known as N-methyl-1,3-benzodioxolylbutanamine or as 3,4-methylenedioxy-N-methyl-α-ethylphenylethylamine, is an entactogen of the phenethylamine, amphetamine, and phenylisobutylamine families related to MDMA. It is known by the nicknames "Eden" and "Methyl-J".

== Use and effects ==
MBDB was first synthesized by pharmacologist and medicinal chemist David E. Nichols and later tested by Alexander Shulgin and described in his book, PiHKAL: A Chemical Love Story. MBDB's dose, according to PiHKAL, is 180 to 210 mg; the proper dosage relative to body mass seems unknown. Its duration is 4 to 8 hours, with noticeable after-effects lasting for 1 to 3 hours.

MBDB was initially developed as a non-psychedelic entactogen. It has lower effects on the dopamine system in comparison to other entactogens such as MDMA. MBDB causes many mild, MDMA-like effects, in particular the lowering of social barriers and inhibitions, pronounced sense of empathy and compassion, and mild euphoria, all of which are present. MBDB tends to produce less euphoria, psychedelia, and stimulation in comparison to MDMA.

Clinical studies have found that MBDB produces similar entactogenic effects to MDMA, but lacks psychedelic and stimulant effects. It enhances mood similarly to MDMA, but lacks the pronounced euphoria of MDMA. MBDB produces prosocial effects similarly to MDMA, although it is said to be moderately less effective.

== Pharmacology ==
=== Pharmacodynamics ===
MBDB acts as a serotonin–norepinephrine releasing agent (SNRA). Its EC_{50} values for induction of monoamine release are 540 nM for serotonin, 3,300 nM for norepinephrine (6.1-fold lower than for serotonin), and >100,000 for dopamine (>185-fold lower than for serotonin). However, it may still have slight dopamine-releasing actions. MBDB fully substitutes for MDMA in drug discrimination tests in rodents. It increases locomotor activity similarly to but less robustly than MDMA. Likewise, MBDB increases conditioned place preference (CPP) similarly but less efficaciously than MDMA. In contrast to MDMA, which produced hyperthermia, MBDB instead produced dose- and time-dependent hypothermia.

MBDB has similar affinities for the serotonin 5-HT_{1A} and 5-HT_{2A} receptors as MDMA. However, MBDB did not show the head-twitch response, a behavioral proxy of psychedelic effects, at any dose in rodents. On the other hand, it produced a significant head-twitch response at a low dose but not at higher doses in another study in rodents. In any case, MBDB (as well as MDMA) do not substitute for lysergic acid diethylamide (LSD) in drug discrimination tests. The lack of apparent hallucinogenic effects with MBDB is analogous to the case of Ariadne, the α-ethyl homologue of DOM; (R)-Ariadne (BL-3912A) showed no psychedelic effects in humans at doses of up to 270 mg orally, whereas DOM is active as a hallucinogen at doses of 5 to 10 mg orally. This may be due to lower activational efficacy at the serotonin 5-HT_{2A} receptor.

MBDB shows greatly reduced capacity to increase oxytocin levels in rodents compared to MMAI and 4-methylthioamphetamine (4-MTA), for reasons that are unclear.

MBDB is a serotonergic neurotoxin similarly to MDMA. However, MBDB appears to have reduced serotonergic neurotoxicity compared to MDMA at behaviorally equivalent doses. In addition, unlike MDMA, MBDB does not produce dopaminergic neurotoxicity in mice.

MBDB and its individual enantiomers, (S)-MBDB and (R)-MBDB, show similar behavioral effects in animals.

=== Pharmacokinetics ===
The metabolism of MBDB has been described in the scientific literature.

== Chemistry ==
MBDB is a ring substituted amphetamine and an analogue of MDMA. Like MDMA, it has a methylenedioxy substitution at the 3 and 4 position on the aromatic ring; this is perhaps the most distinctive feature that structurally define analogues of MDMA, in addition to their unique effects, and as a class they are often referred to as "entactogens" to differentiate between typical stimulant amphetamines that (as a general rule) are not ring substituted. MBDB differs from MDMA by having an ethyl group instead of a methyl group attached to the alpha carbon. Modification at the alpha carbon is uncommon for substituted amphetamines.

=== Synthesis ===
The chemical synthesis of MBDB has been described.

=== Analogues ===
Analogues of MBDB (methyl-J) include BDB (J), EBDB (ethyl-J), BDP (K), MBDP (methyl-K), EBDP (ethyl-K), MPAP (PBDP; propyl-K), and UWA-101 (α-cyclopropyl-MDPEA), among others.

== History ==
MBDB was first described in the scientific literature by a group that included David E. Nichols, Robert A. Oberlender, Peyton Jacob III, and Alexander Shulgin in 1986.

== Society and culture ==
=== Legal status ===
==== International ====
Unlike MDMA, MBDB is not internationally scheduled under the United Nations Convention on Psychotropic Substances. The thirty-second meeting of the WHO Expert Committee on Drug Dependence (September 2000) evaluated MBDB and recommended against scheduling. From the WHO Expert Committee assessment of MBDB:

Although MBDB is both structurally and pharmacologically similar to MDMA, the limited available data indicate that its stimulant and euphoriant effects are less pronounced than those of MDMA. There have been no reports of adverse or toxic effects of MBDB in humans. Law enforcement data on illicit trafficking of MBDB in Europe suggest that its availability and abuse may now be declining after reaching a peak during the latter half of the 1990s. For these reasons, the Committee did not consider the abuse liability of MBDB would constitute a significant risk to public health, thereby warranting its placement under international control. Scheduling of MBDB was therefore not recommended.

==== Australia ====
MBDB is considered a Schedule 9 Prohibited substance in Australia under the Poisons Standard (October 2015). A Schedule 9 substance is a substance which may be abused or misused, the manufacture, possession, sale or use of which should be prohibited by law except when required for medical or scientific research, or for analytical, teaching or training purposes with approval of Commonwealth and/or State or Territory Health Authorities.

==== Finland ====
Scheduled in the "government decree on psychoactive substances banned from the consumer market".

==== Russia ====
MBDB is included into Schedule 1 of the Controlled Substances Act.

==== Sweden ====
Sveriges riksdags health ministry Statens folkhälsoinstitut classified MBDB as "health hazard" under the act Lagen om förbud mot vissa hälsofarliga varor (translated Act on the Prohibition of Certain Goods Dangerous to Health) as of Feb 25, 1999, in their regulation SFS 1999:58 listed as "2-metylamino-1-(3,4-metylendioxifenyl)-butan (MBDB)", making it illegal to sell or possess.

==== United States ====
MBDB is a Schedule I controlled substance in the United States as it is an isomer of MDEA.

== Research ==
MBDB is being assessed by PharmAla Biotech for potential medical use as a pharmaceutical drug, for instance to treat autism.

== See also ==
- Substituted methylenedioxyphenethylamine
- List of investigational hallucinogens and entactogens
