= MEPEA =

MEPEA may refer to:

- 3-Methoxy-4-ethoxyphenethylamine
- N-Methyl-α-ethylphenethylamine
