= Methylcatechol =

Methylcatechol may refer to:

- Guaiacol (O-methylcatechol)
- 3-Methylcatechol
- 4-Methylcatechol
- Phenytoin methylcatechol
