= Α-Ethylmescaline =

AEM

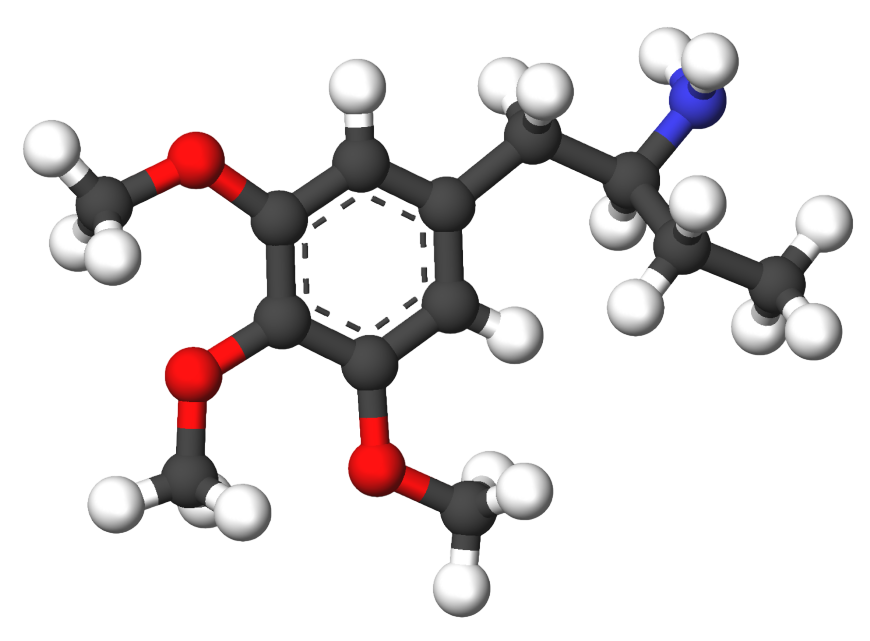

Clinical data
- Other names: AEM; 3,4,5-Trimethoxy-α-ethylphenethylamine; α-Ethyl-3,4,5-trimethoxyphenethylamine;
- ATC code: None

Legal status
- Legal status: AU: S9 (Prohibited substance)

Pharmacokinetic data
- Onset of action: Unknown
- Duration of action: Unknown

Identifiers
- IUPAC name: 1-(3,4,5-trimethoxyphenyl)butan-2-amine
- CAS Number: 17097-73-3
- PubChem CID: 204932
- ChemSpider: 177522
- UNII: LT8WCD9HNK
- CompTox Dashboard (EPA): DTXSID30937911

Chemical and physical data
- Formula: C_{13}H_{21}NO_{3}
- Molar mass: 239.315 g·mol^{−1}
- 3D model (JSmol): Interactive image
- SMILES: COc1c(cc(cc1OC)CC(N)CC)OC
- InChI: InChI=1S/C13H21NO3/c1-5-10(14)6-9-7-11(15-2)13(17-4)12(8-9)16-3/h7-8,10H,5-6,14H2,1-4H3; Key:DCYONQVUAUEKAJ-UHFFFAOYSA-N

α-Ethylmescaline (AEM or 3,4,5-trimethoxy-α-ethylphenethylamine) is a chemical compound of the phenethylamine and phenylisobutylamine families related to the psychedelic drug mescaline. It is the analogue of mescaline and TMA with an ethyl group at the α position of the side chain.

== Use and effects ==
In his book PiHKAL, Alexander Shulgin lists AEM's dose as greater than 220 mg orally and its duration as unknown. It was found to be completely inactive in terms of both central and peripheral effects in humans.

== Pharmacology ==
=== Pharmacodynamics ===
AEM produces the head-twitch response, a behavioral proxy of psychedelic effects, in rodents, but with only about half the potency of mescaline and TMA (α-methylmescaline).

== Chemistry ==
=== Synthesis ===
The chemical synthesis of AEM has been described.

=== Derivatives ===
Alexander Shulgin never synthesized further α position-extended mescaline analogues, such as α-propylmescaline (APM) or α-butylmescaline (ABM), as the inactivity of AEM in humans discouraged him. In any case, APM and ABM have been found to be inactive in terms of induction of the head-twitch response, a behavioral proxy of psychedelic effects, in rodents, and hence may be non-hallucinogenic in humans as well.

== History ==
AEM was first described in the scientific literature by Alexander Shulgin by 1963. He tested it and found it to be inactive in 1961. Later, Shulgin described AEM in greater detail in his 1991 book PiHKAL (Phenethylamines I Have Known and Loved).

== See also ==
- Scaline
- α-Methylmescaline (3,4,5-TMA)
- Ariadne (drug) (α-ethyl-DOM)
