= CP-809101 =

Chemical compound

Clinical data
- ATC code: None

Identifiers
- IUPAC name: 2-[(3-Chlorophenyl)methoxy]-6-(1-piperazinyl)pyrazine
- CAS Number: 479683-64-2
- PubChem CID: 9901086
- ChemSpider: 8076740
- UNII: A2EXW95647
- CompTox Dashboard (EPA): DTXSID60197369

Chemical and physical data
- Formula: C_{15}H_{17}ClN_{4}O
- Molar mass: 304.78 g·mol^{−1}
- 3D model (JSmol): Interactive image
- SMILES: C2CNCCN2c(n3)cncc3OCc(c1)cccc1Cl
- InChI: InChI=1S/C15H17ClN4O/c16-13-3-1-2-12(8-13)11-21-15-10-18-9-14(19-15)20-6-4-17-5-7-20/h1-3,8-10,17H,4-7,11H2; Key:PCWGGOVOEWHPMG-UHFFFAOYSA-N

CP-809101 is a drug which acts as a potent and highly selective serotonin 5-HT_{2C} receptor full agonist. It had promising results in animal models of obesity and psychosis, but associated with genotoxicity which means that future use will be restricted to scientific research applications only.

The drug has more than three orders of magnitude lower potency as an agonist of the serotonin 5-HT_{2A} receptor compared to the serotonin 5-HT_{2C} receptor as well as lower efficacy at the receptor in comparison (E_{max} = 93% and 67%, respectively). It did not produce the head-twitch response in rodents, and was able to antagonize the head-twitch response induce by the psychedelic drug (–)-DOI.
