= Α-Ethyl-N-methylphenethylamine =

MEPEA

Clinical data
- Other names: N-Methyl-α-ethylphenethylamine; MEPEA; α-Et-N-Me-PEA; α-Et-MPEA; α-Et-NM-PEA; α-Et-Meth; α-Ethyl-methamphetamine; AENMPEA; AEMPEA; 2-Methylamino-1-phenylbutane; N-Methyl-1-phenyl-2-butanamine; PAL-426; PAL426
- Drug class: Norepinephrine–dopamine releasing agent; Stimulant; Sympathomimetic

Identifiers
- IUPAC name: N-methyl-1-phenylbutan-2-amine
- CAS Number: 84952-60-3
- PubChem CID: 551747
- ChemSpider: 479992
- UNII: GTM6NOX2CN
- ChEBI: CHEBI:183993
- ChEMBL: ChEMBL3305872
- CompTox Dashboard (EPA): DTXSID40874247

Chemical and physical data
- Formula: C_{11}H_{17}N
- Molar mass: 163.264 g·mol^{−1}
- 3D model (JSmol): Interactive image
- SMILES: CCC(CC1=CC=CC=C1)NC
- InChI: InChI=1S/C11H17N/c1-3-11(12-2)9-10-7-5-4-6-8-10/h4-8,11-12H,3,9H2,1-2H3; Key:ONNVUALDGIKEIJ-UHFFFAOYSA-N

α-Ethyl-N-methylphenethylamine (MEPEA; code name PAL-426) is a stimulant, designer drug, and norepinephrine–dopamine releasing agent (NDRA) of the phenethylamine, amphetamine, and phenylisobutylamine (α-ethylphenethylamine) families. It is the N-methyl derivative of phenylisobutylamine (α-ethylphenethylamine; AEPEA) and is the α-ethyl homologue of methamphetamine (α-methyl-N-methylphenethylamine).

The drug's EC_{50} values for induction of monoamine release are 58 nM for norepinephrine, 179 to 225 nM for dopamine, and 4,698 nM for serotonin. Like amphetamine, MEPEA produces hyperlocomotion and sympathomimetic effects in rodents. It is about one-tenth as potent as d-methamphetamine in drug discrimination and other tests in rodents.

MEPEA was first described in the scientific literature by 1984. It has been encountered as an ingredient in dietary supplements.

== See also ==
- N,α-Diethylphenethylamine
- α-Propylphenethylamine
- Buphedrone (α-ethyl-N-methylcathinone)
