= 4'-Methyl-α-pyrrolidinobutiophenone =

Chemical compound

Legal status
- Legal status: CA: Schedule I; DE: NpSG (Industrial and scientific use only); UK: Class B

Identifiers
- IUPAC name: (RS)-1-(4-methylphenyl)-2-(1-pyrrolidinyl)-1-butanone
- CAS Number: 732180-91-5
- PubChem CID: 57486975
- ChemSpider: 52084421
- UNII: B1GB3U8YGM
- CompTox Dashboard (EPA): DTXSID201024526

Chemical and physical data
- Formula: C_{15}H_{21}NO
- Molar mass: 231.339 g·mol^{−1}
- 3D model (JSmol): Interactive image
- Chirality: Racemic mixture
- SMILES: C1CCCN1C(CC)C(=O)c(cc2)ccc2C
- InChI: InChI=1S/C15H21NO/c1-3-14(16-10-4-5-11-16)15(17)13-8-6-12(2)7-9-13/h6-9,14H,3-5,10-11H2,1-2H3; Key:NXNPGAAZKYDOPW-UHFFFAOYSA-N

4'-Methyl-α-pyrrolidinobutiophenone or MPBP is a stimulant compound which has been reported as a novel designer drug. It is closely related to pyrovalerone, being simply its chain-shortened homologue.

== See also ==
- α-Pyrrolidinobutiophenone (α-PBP)
- 3',4'-Methylenedioxy-α-pyrrolidinobutiophenone (MDPBP)
