= N-Alkylamphetamine =

N-Alkylamphetamine, or a substituted N-alkylamphetamine, is an amphetamine with an alkyl group at the amine nitrogen and can refer to:

- N-Methylamphetamine (methamphetamine)
- N-Ethylamphetamine (ethylamphetamine)
- N-Propylamphetamine (propylamphetamine)
- N-Isopropylamphetamine (isopropylamphetamine)
- N-Butylamphetamine (butylamphetamine)

N,N-Dialkylamphetamines include dimethylamphetamine (N,N-dimethylamphetamine) and derivatives like metamfepramone (dimethylpropion, N,N-dimethylcathinone), amfepramone (diethylpropion, N,N-diethylcathinone), MDDM (N,N-diethyl-MDMA), dimethylone, dibutylone, and dipentylone.

An N,N,N-trialkylamphetamine is MDTMA (N,N,N-trimethyl-MDA).

== See also ==
- Substituted amphetamine
- Amphetamine
- Benzphetamine
- α-Alkylphenethylamine
