= 1,3-Benzodioxolyl-N-ethylbutanamine =

Psychoactive drug

EBDB

Clinical data
- Other names: 1,3-Benzodioxolyl-N-ethylbutanamine; EBDB; 3,4-Methenedioxy-α,N-diethylphenethylamine
- Routes of administration: Oral
- ATC code: None

Pharmacokinetic data
- Duration of action: "Probably short"

Identifiers
- IUPAC name: 1-(2H-1,3-benzodioxol-5-yl)-N-ethylbutan-2-amine
- CAS Number: 167394-39-0
- PubChem CID: 10214504
- ChemSpider: 8389996
- UNII: 5Y22MYG54G
- CompTox Dashboard (EPA): DTXSID90436778

Chemical and physical data
- Formula: C_{13}H_{19}NO_{2}
- Molar mass: 221.300 g·mol^{−1}
- 3D model (JSmol): Interactive image
- Melting point: 176 to 177 °C (349 to 351 °F)
- SMILES: O1c2ccc(cc2OC1)CC(NCC)CC
- InChI: InChI=1S/C13H19NO2/c1-3-11(14-4-2)7-10-5-6-12-13(8-10)16-9-15-12/h5-6,8,11,14H,3-4,7,9H2,1-2H3; Key:IYZPKSQJPVUWRO-UHFFFAOYSA-N

EBDB, also known as 1,3-benzodioxolyl-N-ethylbutanamine, 3,4-methylenedioxy-α,N-diethylphenethylamine, or ethyl-J, is a psychoactive drug of the phenethylamine, phenylisobutylamine, and MDxx families. It is the N-ethyl analogue of BDB (J) and the α-ethyl analogue of MDEA.

== Use and effects ==
In his book PiHKAL (Phenethylamines I Have Known and Loved), Alexander Shulgin lists EBDB's minimum dose as 90 mg orally and its duration as unknown. It produced few to no effects at the tested doses.

== Chemistry ==
=== Synthesis ===
The chemical synthesis of EBDB has been described.

== See also ==
- Substituted methylenedioxyphenethylamine
- Methylbenzodioxolylbutanamine (MBDB; Methyl-J)
- Ethylbenzodioxolylpentanamine (EBDP; Ethyl-K)
- Eutylone (βk-Ethyl-J)
- Methylenedioxyphenylpropylaminopentane (MPAP)
