= 4'-Methyl-α-pyrrolidinopropiophenone =

Chemical compound

Legal status
- Legal status: DE: Anlage I (Authorized scientific use only); UK: Class B; US: Schedule I; Banned in Sweden

Identifiers
- IUPAC name: (RS)-1-(4-methylphenyl)-2-(1-pyrrolidinyl)-1-propanone
- CAS Number: 28117-80-8 1313393-58-6 (hydrochloride)
- PubChem CID: 6430745
- ChemSpider: 4936084
- UNII: 0TY023967I
- CompTox Dashboard (EPA): DTXSID80891438

Chemical and physical data
- Formula: C_{14}H_{19}NO
- Molar mass: 217.312 g·mol^{−1}
- 3D model (JSmol): Interactive image
- SMILES: CC1=CC=C(C=C1)C(=O)C(C)N2CCCC2
- InChI: InChI=1S/C14H19NO/c1-11-5-7-13(8-6-11)14(16)12(2)15-9-3-4-10-15/h5-8,12H,3-4,9-10H2,1-2H3; Key:APSJUNFBAXIXLK-UHFFFAOYSA-N

4'-Methyl-α-pyrrolidinopropiophenone (4-MePPP, MPPP or MαPPP) is a stimulant drug and substituted cathinone. It is structurally very similar to α-PPP, with only one added methyl group in the para position on the phenyl ring. 4-MePPP was sold in Germany as a designer drug in the late 1990s and early 2000s, along with a number of other pyrrolidinophenone derivatives. Although it has never achieved the same international popularity as its better-known relations α-PPP and MDPV, 4-MePPP is still sometimes found as an ingredient of grey-market "bath salt" blends such as "NRG-3".

== Legality ==
4-MePPP is unscheduled in the United States, but could be consider an analogue of Mephedrone or another scheduled cathinone, which would make it schedule 1 when sold for human consumption due to the Federal Analogue Act

== See also ==
- α-Pyrrolidinopropiophenone (α-PPP)
- 4'-Methoxy-α-pyrrolidinopropiophenone (MOPPP)
- 3,4-Methylenedioxy-α-pyrrolidinopropiophenone (MDPPP)
- 3',4'-Methylenedioxy-α-pyrrolidinobutiophenone (MDPBP)
