= 4-Methylphenylisobutylamine =

Stimulant drug of the phenethylamine class

Clinical data
- Routes of administration: Oral
- ATC code: none

Legal status
- Legal status: Uncontrolled (but may be covered under the Federal Analogue Act in the United States and under similar bills in other countries)

Identifiers
- IUPAC name: 1-(4-methylphenyl)butan-2-amine
- CAS Number: 147702-26-9; HCl: 861007-56-9
- PubChem CID: 43566024
- ChemSpider: 13914039
- UNII: VYC2G7R2PC; HCl: TX348R5PZP
- CompTox Dashboard (EPA): DTXSID90656191

Chemical and physical data
- Formula: C_{11}H_{17}N
- Molar mass: 163.264 g·mol^{−1}
- 3D model (JSmol): Interactive image
- SMILES: c1cc(C)ccc1CC(N)CC
- InChI: InChI=1S/C11H17N/c1-9(2)8-12-11-6-4-10(3)5-7-11/h4-7,9,12H,8H2,1-3H3; Key:WZWNIVYQWJRDQX-UHFFFAOYSA-N

4-Methylphenylisobutylamine (4-MAB), also known as 4-methyl-α-ethylphenethylamine, is a stimulant drug of the phenethylamine, amphetamine, and phenylisobutylamine families.

== See also ==
- Phenylisobutylamine
- 4-Methylamphetamine
- Benzodioxolylbutanamine
