= N,α-Diethylphenethylamine =

Chemical compound

Clinical data
- Other names: DEPEA; NADEP; N,α-DEPEA; α,N-DEPEA; N,α-Diethylphenylethylamine; N,α-Diethylbenzeneethanamine; 2-Amino-N-ethyl-1-phenylbutane; 2-Ethylamino-1-phenylbutane; Ethyl(1-phenylbutan-2-yl)amine; EAPB; α-Et-EPEA

Legal status
- Legal status: CA: Schedule I; DE: NpSG (Industrial and scientific use only); NZ: Class C; UK: Class A

Identifiers
- IUPAC name: N-Ethyl-1-phenylbutan-2-amine
- CAS Number: 119486-07-6 29805-52-5 (HCl)
- PubChem CID: 14833603
- ChemSpider: 27101303
- UNII: 7V4PP58Q6T
- CompTox Dashboard (EPA): DTXSID501017073

Chemical and physical data
- Formula: C_{12}H_{19}N
- Molar mass: 177.291 g·mol^{−1}
- 3D model (JSmol): Interactive image
- SMILES: C(C)NC(CC1=CC=CC=C1)CC
- InChI: InChI=1S/C12H19N/c1-3-12(13-4-2)10-11-8-6-5-7-9-11/h5-9,12-13H,3-4,10H2,1-2H3; Key:KHWYSUBVXWWBRB-UHFFFAOYSA-N

N,α-Diethylphenethylamine (DEPEA or NADEP), also known as 2-ethylamino-1-phenylbutane (EAPB) is a stimulant drug of the phenylisobutylamine (α-ethylphenethylamine) group. It is a close chemical analog of methamphetamine, and has been sold as a designer drug. It was originally patented by Knoll Pharma as one of several analogs for pharmaceutical applications. In animal models these analogs showed properties of cognitive enhancement and increased pain tolerance. Nevertheless, this class of compounds was never developed into a medicine.

== Pharmacology ==
DEPEA is a mixed norepinephrine–dopamine releasing agent (NDRA) and norepinephrine–dopamine reuptake inhibitor (NDRI). It is a full releaser of norepinephrine but a weak partial releaser of dopamine with a maximal efficacy of about 40% in rat brain synaptosomes. In another study however, DEPEA non-significantly released norepinephrine but did not release dopamine at all in human embryonic kidney 293 (HEK293) cells transfected with the monoamine transporters, whereas it continued to act as an NDRI in this system. In a third study, DEPEA did not induce dopamine efflux in rat striatal slices. The drug produces hyperlocomotion, a stimulant-like effect, in rodents. It is approximately 10-fold less potent than amphetamine in terms of this effect.

DEPEA is a low-potency agonist of the rat trace amine-associated receptor 1 (TAAR1) (EC_{50} = 3,500 nM) but was inactive as an agonist of the mouse and human TAAR1 at least up to the maximal assessed concentrations (EC_{50} > 4,400 nM and 30,000 nM, respectively).

N,α-DEPEA has not been studied in humans, but experts such as Pieter Cohen of Harvard Medical School expect it to be less potent than methamphetamine, but greater than ephedrine.

== Adulterant in nutritional supplements ==
In January 2013, the South Korean authorities reported seizing a large quantity of the pure material, predicting it would soon be found on the market. Later in 2013, it was found as an adulterant in biologically significant amounts in the pre-workout supplements Craze (marketed by Driven Sports, Inc.) and Detonate (marketed by Gaspari Nutrition). It was falsely claimed to be Dendrobium extract.

== See also ==
- α-Propylphenethylamine (APPEA)
- Buphedrone
- Butylone
- EBDB
- Etilamfetamine
- Eutylone
- N-Ethylbuphedrone
