= 1,3-Benzodioxolylbutanamine =

Entactogen drug

BDB

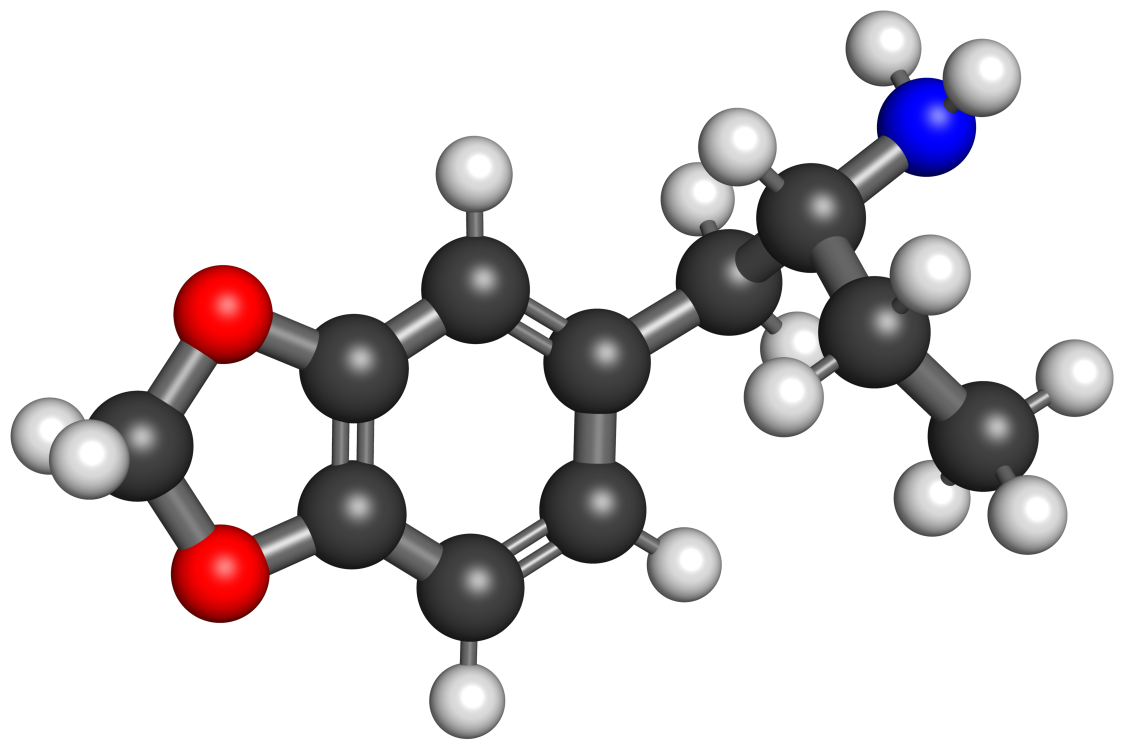

Clinical data
- Other names: BDB; MDB; J; 3,4-Methylenedioxy-α-ethylphenethylamine; MDAEPEA; Benzodioxolylbutanamine; 3,4-Methylenedioxybutanphenamine
- Routes of administration: Oral
- Drug class: Serotonin–norepinephrine releasing agent; Entactogen

Legal status
- Legal status: DE: Anlage I (Authorized scientific use only); UK: Class A; US: Analogue to a Schedule I/II drug

Identifiers
- IUPAC name: 1-(1,3-benzodioxol-5-yl)butan-2-amine
- CAS Number: 107447-03-0; HCl: 42542-07-4
- PubChem CID: 129870
- ChemSpider: 114963
- UNII: CM58WOT28Y; HCl: RFD67T622Z
- ChEBI: CHEBI:190948
- ChEMBL: ChEMBL61507
- CompTox Dashboard (EPA): DTXSID30910325

Chemical and physical data
- Formula: C_{11}H_{15}NO_{2}
- Molar mass: 193.246 g·mol^{−1}
- 3D model (JSmol): Interactive image
- Melting point: 159 to 161 °C (318 to 322 °F)
- SMILES: CCC(CC1=CC2=C(C=C1)OCO2)N
- InChI: InChI=1S/C11H15NO2/c1-2-9(12)5-8-3-4-10-11(6-8)14-7-13-10/h3-4,6,9H,2,5,7,12H2,1H3; Key:VHMRXGAIDDCGDU-UHFFFAOYSA-N

1,3-Benzodioxolylbutanamine (BDB), also known as 3,4-methylenedioxy-α-ethylphenethylamine or as J, is an entactogen of the phenethylamine, phenylisobutylamine, and MDxx families related to MDMA.

== Use and effects ==
In his book PiHKAL (Phenethylamines I Have Known and Loved), Alexander Shulgin lists BDB's dose as 150 to 230 mg orally and its duration as 4 to 8 hours. BDB produces entactogenic, MDMA-like effects. Although pleasant and euphoric, BDB is also fairly sedating, and some users feel that the lack of stimulant effect makes it less enjoyable than other similar drugs. Additional side effects associated with BDB include nystagmus and dizziness.

== Pharmacology ==
=== Pharmacodynamics ===
Receptor and transporter interaction data have been reported for BDB. It acts as a serotonin–norepinephrine releasing agent (SNDRA) with only weak effects on dopamine. Animal studies and anecdotal reports have found that BDB is a slightly more potent serotonin releasing agent than its methylated sister compound methylbenzodioxylbutanamine (MBDB; "Eden", "Methyl-J").

== Chemistry ==
BDB, also known as 1,3-benzodioxolylbutanamine or as 3,4-methylenedioxy-α-ethylphenethylamine, is a phenethylamine, α-ethylphenethylamine (phenylisobutylamine), and methylenedioxyphenethylamine (MDxx) related to MDMA. It is the α-ethyl analogue of 3,4-methylenedioxyphenethylamine (MDPEA) and 3,4-methylenedioxyamphetamine (MDA) and the 3,4-methylenedioxy derivative of α-ethylphenethylamine (AEPEA).

=== Synthesis ===
The chemical synthesis of BDB has been described.

=== Analogues ===
Analogues of BDB include MBDB (methyl-J), EBDB (ethyl-J), 1,3-benzodioxolylpentanamine (BDP; K), MBDP (methyl-K), EBDP (ethyl-K), and MPAP (PDBP; propyl-K), among others.

== History ==
BDB was first described in the scientific literature by at least 1973.

== Society and culture ==
=== Recreational use ===
Rather than as a recreational drug itself, BDB is more commonly known as a metabolite of the N-alkylated analogues MBDB and ethylbenzodioxylbutanamine (EBDB; "Ethyl-J"), which have appeared in MDMA or "ecstasy" tablets. Although BDB itself has not been reported as being sold as "ecstasy", urine analysis of users suggest that this drug may have appeared as a street drug, though it is unclear whether the positive urine test for BDB resulted from consumption of BDB itself or merely as a metabolite of MBDB.

=== Legal status ===
==== Germany ====
BDB is illegal in Germany (Anlage I).

== See also ==
- Substituted methylenedioxyphenethylamine
- Substituted phenylisobutylamine
