= 4C-B =

Clinical data
- Other names: 4C-DOB; DOB-B; 4-Bromo-2,5-dimethoxy-α-ethylphenethylamine
- Routes of administration: Oral
- Drug class: Serotonin 5-HT_{2A} receptor agonist; Serotonergic psychedelic; Hallucinogen
- ATC code: None

Pharmacokinetic data
- Duration of action: ~8 hours

Identifiers
- IUPAC name: 1-(4-bromo-2,5-dimethoxyphenyl)butan-2-amine
- CAS Number: 69294-23-1
- PubChem CID: 12140147
- ChemSpider: 23256805
- ChEMBL: ChEMBL365711
- CompTox Dashboard (EPA): DTXSID101336665

Chemical and physical data
- Formula: C_{12}H_{18}BrNO_{2}
- Molar mass: 288.185 g·mol^{−1}
- 3D model (JSmol): Interactive image
- Melting point: 204 to 206 °C (399 to 403 °F)
- SMILES: CCC(CC1=CC(=C(C=C1OC)Br)OC)N
- InChI: InChI=1S/C12H18BrNO2/c1-4-9(14)5-8-6-12(16-3)10(13)7-11(8)15-2/h6-7,9H,4-5,14H2,1-3H3; Key:QQPRORAZQWLMTQ-UHFFFAOYSA-N

4C-B, also known as 4C-DOB or DOB-B, as well as 4-bromo-2,5-dimethoxy-α-ethylphenethylamine, is a lesser-known psychedelic drug of the phenethylamine, phenylisobutylamine, and 4C families related to 2C-B (the 2C analogue) and DOB (the DOx analogue).

It is briefly mentioned in Alexander Shulgin's 1991 book PiHKAL (Phenethylamines I Have Known And Loved), but was never tested by Shulgin. Subsequently, the drug was tested by Daniel Trachsel and colleagues, and was found to be active in a dose range of 50 to 80 mg orally with a duration of around 8 hours. It produced pronounced psychedelic effects, though with generally milder effects than 2C-B or DOB.

The drug is a reasonably potent serotonin 5-HT_{2A} receptor partial agonist with a K_{i} of 7.6 nM, but has relatively low efficacy (15% relative to 5-HT).

4C-B is a controlled substance in Canada under phenethylamine blanket-ban language, but is not explicitly controlled in the United States.

== See also ==
- 4C (psychedelics)
- 4C-T-2
- Ariadne (psychedelic) (4C-D)
- ZC-B
