= 3',4'-Methylenedioxy-α-pyrrolidinopropiophenone =

Stimulant drug

MDPPP

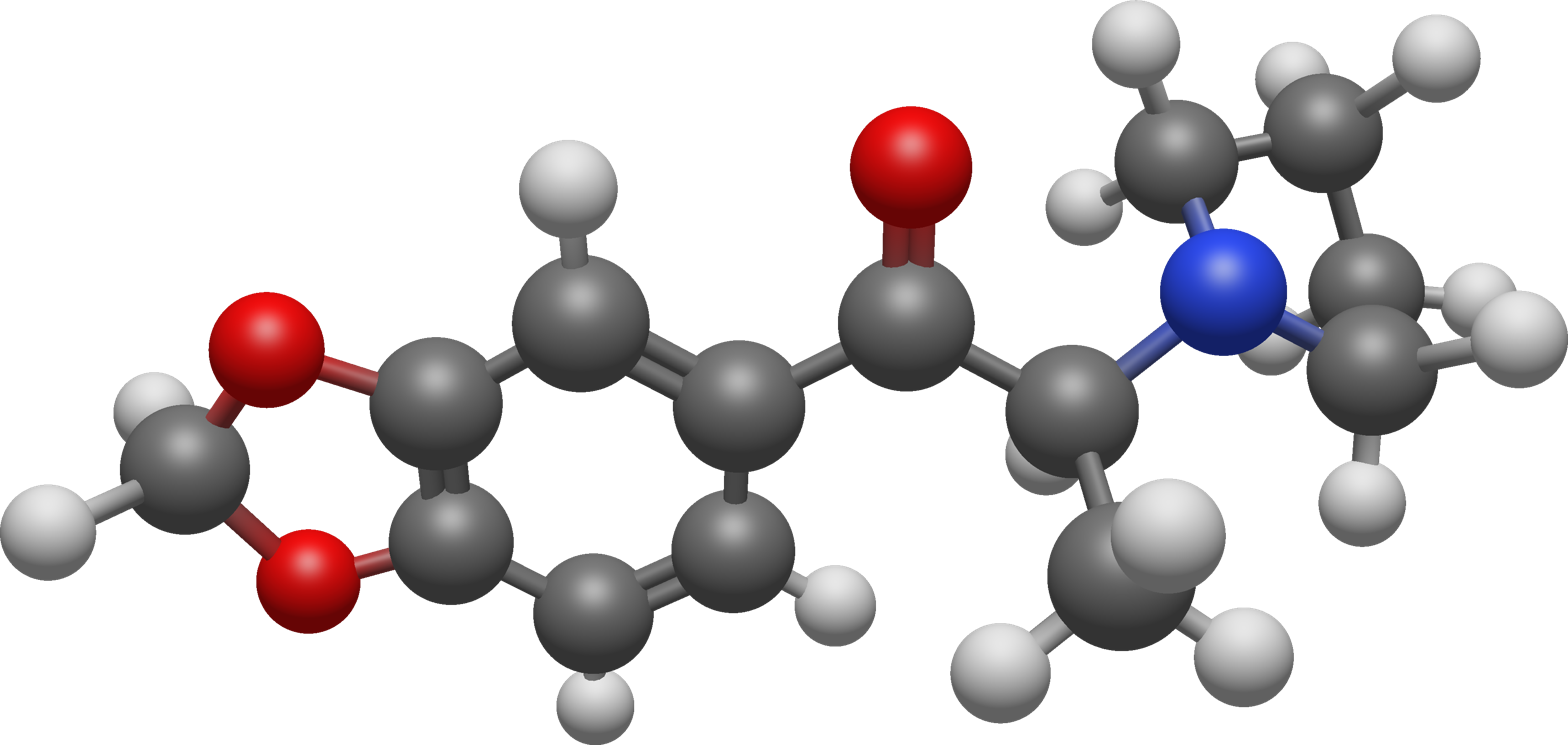

Clinical data
- Routes of administration: By mouth, insufflation, vaporization, IV, rectal, sublingual
- ATC code: None

Legal status
- Legal status: DE: Anlage I (Authorized scientific use only); UK: Class B

Pharmacokinetic data
- Metabolism: Hepatic
- Excretion: Primarily urine (renal)

Identifiers
- IUPAC name: (RS)-1-(3,4-methylenedioxyphenyl)-2-(1-pyrrolidinyl)-1-propanone
- CAS Number: 783241-66-7
- PubChem CID: 6430845
- ChemSpider: 4936183
- UNII: 83IP4LIH8E
- CompTox Dashboard (EPA): DTXSID001024625

Chemical and physical data
- Formula: C_{14}H_{17}NO_{3}
- Molar mass: 247.294 g·mol^{−1}
- 3D model (JSmol): Interactive image
- Chirality: Racemic mixture
- SMILES: c3c1OCOc1ccc3C(=O)C(C)N2CCCC2
- InChI: InChI=1S/C14H17NO3/c1-10(15-6-2-3-7-15)14(16)11-4-5-12-13(8-11)18-9-17-12/h4-5,8,10H,2-3,6-7,9H2,1H3; Key:NIYQOTCYXGXMPI-UHFFFAOYSA-N

3',4'-Methylenedioxy-α-pyrrolidinopropiophenone (MDPPP) is a stimulant designer drug. It was sold in Germany in the late 1990s and early 2000s as an ingredient in imitation ecstasy (MDMA) pills. It shares a similar chemical structure with α-PPP and MDPV, and has been shown to have reinforcing effects in rats.

== Metabolism ==
MDPPP appears to have a similar metabolic fate as MDPV.

== Legal status ==
As of October 2015 MDPPP is a controlled substance in China.

== See also ==
- Substituted methylenedioxyphenethylamine
- α-Pyrrolidinopropiophenone (α-PPP)
- 4'-Methyl-α-pyrrolidinopropiophenone (MPPP)
- 4'-Methoxy-α-pyrrolidinopropiophenone (MOPPP)
- 3',4'-Methylenedioxy-α-pyrrolidinobutiophenone (MDPBP)
- Dimethylone
