= 4C (psychedelics) =

Class of chemical compounds

Ariadne (4C-D).

4C (4C-x), also known as 4-substituted 2,5-dimethoxy-α-ethylphenethylamines, is a general name for the family of psychedelic and related phenylisobutylamines (α-ethylphenethylamines) having methoxy groups at the 2 and 5 positions of the phenyl ring and a 4-position substituent. These compounds are analogues of the 2Cs and DOx drugs, but the α-alkyl chain has been further lengthed (0 carbons for 2C, 1 carbon for DOx, and 2 carbons for 4C).

The most notable and well-known of the 4C drugs is Ariadne (4C-D). This drug produces only threshold psychedelic effects and has been described as non-hallucinogenic or as having "the alert of a psychedelic, with none of the rest of the package". These unique properties have made Ariadne of interest for potential therapeutic applications. In contrast to Ariadne, other 4C drugs, such as 4C-B, have been reported to be more significantly psychedelic. The pharmacology of the 4C drugs has been studied and they are known to act as serotonin 5-HT_{2A} receptor agonists, but with lower efficacy than other related psychedelics like the 2Cs and DOx drugs.

4C drugs have been developed and/or studied by Alexander Shulgin, Daniel Trachsel, and Michael Cunningham and colleagues.

== List of 4C drugs ==
Structure	Name(s)	Chemical name	CAS #
	Ariadne (4C-D)	1-(2,5-Dimethoxy-4-methylphenyl)butan-2-amine	52842-59-8
	4C-B	1-(2,5-Dimethoxy-4-bromophenyl)butan-2-amine	69294-23-1
	4C-C	1-(2,5-Dimethoxy-4-chlorophenyl)butan-2-amine	791010-74-7
	4C-E	1-(2,5-Dimethoxy-4-ethylphenyl)butan-2-amine	72667-79-9
	4C-I	1-(2,5-Dimethoxy-4-iodophenyl)butan-2-amine	758631-75-3
	4C-N	1-(2,5-Dimethoxy-4-nitrophenyl)butan-2-amine	775234-58-7
	4C-P (4C-Pr)	1-(2,5-Dimethoxy-4-(n-propyl)phenyl)butan-2-amine	72667-81-3
	4C-T-2	1-[2,5-Dimethoxy-4-(ethylthio)phenyl]butan-2-amine	850007-13-5
	4C-TFM	1-[2,5-Dimethoxy-4-(trifluoromethyl)phenyl]butan-2-amine	?

Various other 4C drugs have also been studied and described.

== See also ==
- Substituted methoxyphenethylamine, 2C, DOx
- PiHKAL (Phenethylamines I Have Known and Loved)
- The Shulgin Index, Volume One: Psychedelic Phenethylamines and Related Compounds
- 5C-D
