= Phenylisobutylamine =

Stimulant drug of the phenethylamine class

Clinical data
- Other names: α-Ethylphenethylamine; α-Ethylphenylethylamine; Butanphenamine; B; AEPEA
- Routes of administration: Oral
- Drug class: Norepinephrine–dopamine releasing agent; Stimulant
- ATC code: None

Legal status
- Legal status: CA: Schedule I; DE: NpSG (Industrial and scientific use only); UK: Class A; US: Schedule II (isomer of Methamphetamine)

Identifiers
- IUPAC name: 1-phenylbutan-2-amine
- CAS Number: 53309-89-0
- PubChem CID: 103771
- ChemSpider: 93687
- UNII: L76NRN6FL5
- CompTox Dashboard (EPA): DTXSID50874112

Chemical and physical data
- Formula: C_{10}H_{15}N
- Molar mass: 149.237 g·mol^{−1}
- 3D model (JSmol): Interactive image
- SMILES: CCC(CC1=CC=CC=C1)N
- InChI: InChI=1S/C10H15N/c1-2-10(11)8-9-6-4-3-5-7-9/h3-7,10H,2,8,11H2,1H3; Key:IOLQWLOHKZENDW-UHFFFAOYSA-N

Phenylisobutylamine, also known as α-ethylphenethylamine (AEPEA) or as butanphenamine (B), is a stimulant drug of the phenethylamine and amphetamine families. It is a higher homologue of amphetamine, differing from amphetamine's molecular structure only by the substitution of the methyl group at the alpha position of the side chain with an ethyl group.

Phenylisobutylamine acts as a norepinephrine–dopamine releasing agent (NDRA) and has been found to produce stimulant-like and reinforcing effects in animals. It shows much lower potency and a greater preference for induction of norepinephrine release compared to dextroamphetamine.

"Phenylisobutylamine" is in fact a chemical misnomer because isobutylamine itself contains a branched chain. The correct name after this style for this class of compound would be "phenylsecbutylamine".

== Derivatives ==
A number of notable derivatives of phenylisobutylamine are known, including the following:

- α-Ethylmescaline (AEM)
- N-Methyl-α-ethylphenethylamine (MEPEA)
- N,α-Diethylphenethylamine (DEPEA)
- BDB
- MBDB
- EBDB
- 5-MBPB (5-MABB)
- 6-MBPB (6-MABB)
- 4-CAB (α-Et-PCA)
- 4-MAB (α-Et-4-MA)
- Buphedrone
- N-Ethylbuphedrone
- 3F-NEB
- 4-Methylbuphedrone
- Butylone (βk-MBDB)
- Eutylone (βk-EBDB)
- Dibutylone (βk-DMBDB)
- Ariadne (α-Et-DOM)
- 4C-B (α-Et-DOB)
- 4C-T-2 (α-Et-2C-T-2)
- α-Pyrrolidinobutiophenone (α-PBP)
- MPBP
- MDPBP

Additional derivatives with longer α chains also exist, for instance pentedrone, MBDP, pentylone, MDPV, and hexedrone, as well as others, like mexedrone.

Whereas MDMA is a serotonin–norepinephrine–dopamine releasing agent (SNDRA), MBDB appears to be a highly selective serotonin–norepinephrine releasing agent (SNRA) and with significant preference for induction of serotonin release over norepinephrine release.

The phenylisobutylamine counterparts of psychedelic phenethylamines and amphetamines, for instance MBDB (the α-ethyl homologue of MDMA) and Ariadne (the α-ethyl homologue of DOM), show greatly reduced or abolished psychedelic effects in comparison. This has also applied to α-ethyltryptamine (αΕΤ), which is non-hallucinogenic in contrast to α-methyltryptamine (αMT). In the case of Ariadne specifically, it may be due to reduced efficacy in activating the serotonin 5-HT_{2A} receptor.

== See also ==
- α-Propylphenethylamine (APPEA)
- 4C (psychedelics)
