= Ariadne (drug) =

Psychoactive drug

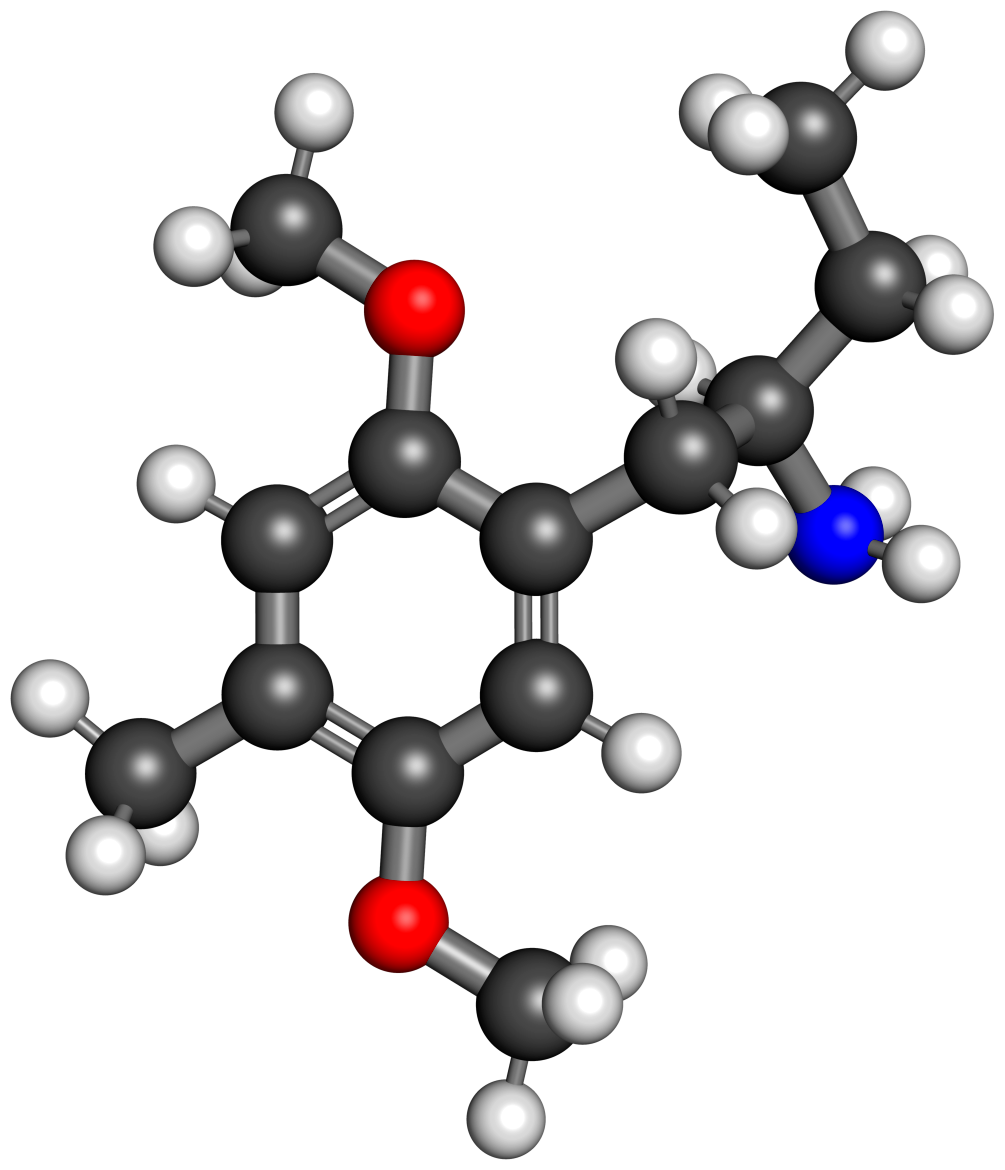

Clinical data
- Trade names: Dimoxamine (tentative)
- Other names: ARIADNE; 4-Methyl-2,5-dimethoxy-α-ethylphenethylamine; 2,5-Dimethoxy-4-methyl-α-ethylphenethylamine; 4C-D; 4C-DOM; "Four-carbon DOM"; α-Ethyl-2C-D; α-Et-2C-D; α-Desmethyl-α-ethyl-DOM; BL-3912; BL3912; Dimoxamine; 1-(4-Methyl)-2,5-dimethoxyphenyl-2-aminobutane; MDPA-1
- Routes of administration: Oral
- Drug class: Serotonin 5-HT_{2A}, 5-HT_{2B}, and 5-HT_{2C} receptor agonist; Non-hallucinogenic serotonin 5-HT_{2A} receptor agonist; Antidepressant; Stimulant
- ATC code: None

Legal status
- Legal status: US: Schedule I (positional isomer of DOET)

Pharmacokinetic data
- Duration of action: ~2–5 hours

Identifiers
- IUPAC name: 1-(2,5-dimethoxy-4-methylphenyl)butan-2-amine
- CAS Number: 52842-58-7 52842-59-8 ((R)-isomer)
- PubChem CID: 169886
- ChemSpider: 148565
- UNII: 09426ZTO78
- CompTox Dashboard (EPA): DTXSID501343240 DTXSID30967314, DTXSID501343240

Chemical and physical data
- Formula: C_{13}H_{21}NO_{2}
- Molar mass: 223.316 g·mol^{−1}
- 3D model (JSmol): Interactive image
- SMILES: O(c1cc(c(OC)cc1C[C@H](N)CC)C)C
- InChI: InChI=1S/C13H21NO2/c1-5-11(14)7-10-8-12(15-3)9(2)6-13(10)16-4/h6,8,11H,5,7,14H2,1-4H3; Key:MLYCFWZIAJAIGW-UHFFFAOYSA-N

Ariadne, also known chemically as 4C-D or 4C-DOM, by its developmental code name BL-3912, and by its former tentative brand name Dimoxamine, is a non-hallucinogenic psychoactive drug of the phenethylamine, phenylisobutylamine (α-ethylphenethylamine), and 4C families. It is a close analogue of the psychedelic drugs 2C-D and DOM, with 2C-D having no substitution at the α carbon, DOM having an α-methyl group, and Ariadne having an α-ethyl group. Ariadne is taken orally.

The drug is a serotonin 5-HT_{2} receptor partial agonist, including of the serotonin 5-HT_{2A} receptor, similarly to psychedelics. However, Ariadne is not hallucinogenic in humans, but is still psychoactive, producing antidepressant and mild stimulant effects such as feelings of well-being and mental alertness. The drug shows dopaminergic actions in animals, such as increased motivation and reversal of parkinsonism, which may be mediated by serotonin 5-HT_{2A} receptor activation-induced dopamine release in the brain. It is thought that the non-psychedelic nature of Ariadne with retained psychoactive effects is due to reduced but still high efficacy at the serotonin 5-HT_{2A} receptor relative to psychedelics.

Ariadne was first synthesized by Alexander Shulgin in 1968 and its psychoactive effects were discovered by Shulgin in 1969. It was developed as a potential pharmaceutical drug at Bristol Laboratories, for instance as an antidepressant and for various other uses, and entered clinical trials around 1974. The drug reached phase 3 trials prior to its development being shelved. The development of Ariadne is said to have been discontinued for strategic economic reasons rather than due to issues with effectiveness or safety. There has been renewed interest in Ariadne and similar drugs in the 2020s owing to increased interest in psychedelics for treatment of psychiatric disorders. Ariadne is not an explicitly controlled substance in the United States, but may be considered Schedule I as an isomer of DOET.

== Use and effects ==
In his book PiHKAL (Phenethylamines I Have Known and Loved), Alexander Shulgin reported human tests of Ariadne at doses of up to 32 mg orally, finding that it produced "the alert of a psychedelic, with none of the rest of the package". It had a duration of roughly 2 to 5 hours. Very little published data exists about the human pharmacology of Ariadne apart from Shulgin's limited testing; unpublished human trials reportedly observed some psychoactive effects, but no hallucinogenic effects. Ariadne is one of Shulgin's "ten classic ladies", a series of methylated DOM derivatives.

In his book The Shulgin Index, Volume One: Psychedelic Phenethylamines and Related Compounds, Shulgin described (R)-Ariadne as increasing mental alertness and producing feelings of well-being at doses of 25 to 50 mg orally. It was claimed to improve symptoms of manic depression in psychotic individuals at doses of 50 to 100 mg orally and to improve symptoms of Parkinson's disease at a dosage of 100 mg/day orally. Doses of up to 300 mg resulted in an altered state of consciousness but still no psychedelic effects. For comparison, DOM shows psychoactive sub-hallucinogenic effects at doses of 1 to 3 mg orally and psychedelic effects at doses of more than 3 mg orally.

Another related drug with similar psychoactive effects as Ariadne is thiobuscaline.

== Overdose ==
Ariadne, as the (R)- enantiomer, is active at doses as low as 25 mg and was tested in clinical trials at doses of 50 to 100 mg. Doses as high as 300 mg have been assessed, more than 10 times higher than the minimum reported active dose. No psychedelic effects occurred at this or lower doses, but therapeutic effects were observed.

== Interactions ==
Hamilton Morris has described the combination of (R)-Ariadne and fluoxetine as unexpectedly strongly potentiating the effects and duration of (R)-Ariadne such that (R)-Ariadne became potently psychedelic in its effects and lasted over 24 hours. Morris assumed that this was due to some kind of enzyme inhibition caused by fluoxetine, for instance cytochrome P450 inhibition.

== Pharmacology ==
=== Pharmacodynamics ===
Ariadne activities
| Target | Affinity (K_{i}, nM) |
|---|---|
| 5-HT_{1A} | >10,000 (K_{i}); 656 (EC_{50}); 68% (E_{max}) |
| 5-HT_{1B} | >10,000 (K_{i}); 4,023 (EC_{50}); 90% (E_{max}) |
| 5-HT_{1D} | ND (K_{i}); 612 (EC_{50}); 65% (E_{max}) |
| 5-HT_{1E} | ND (K_{i}); 727 (EC_{50}); 79% (E_{max}) |
| 5-HT_{1F} | ND (K_{i}); 690 (EC_{50}); 75% (E_{max}) |
| 5-HT_{2A} | 120 (K_{i}); 39–1,300 (EC_{50}); 80–97% (E_{max}) |
| 5-HT_{2B} | >10,000 (K_{i}); 217–>32,000 (EC_{50}); 68–85% (E_{max}) |
| 5-HT_{2C} | ND (K_{i}); 120–3,020 (EC_{50}); 34–93% (E_{max}) |
| 5-HT_{3} | >10,000 |
| 5-HT_{4} | ND (K_{i}); ND (EC_{50}) <20% (E_{max}) |
| 5-HT_{5A} | ND (K_{i}); ND (EC_{50}) <20% (E_{max}) |
| 5-HT_{6} | ND (K_{i}); 1,038 (EC_{50}); 42% (E_{max}) |
| 5-HT_{7} | ND (K_{i}); ND (EC_{50}) <20% (E_{max}) |
| α_{1A} | >10,000 |
| α_{1B}, α_{1D} | ND |
| α_{2A} | >10,000 |
| α_{2B}, α_{2C} | ND |
| β_{1}, β_{2} | >10,000 |
| β_{3} | ND |
| D_{1}, D_{2} | >10,000 |
| D_{3}–D_{5} | ND |
| H_{1}, H_{2} | >10,000 |
| H_{3}, H_{4} | ND |
| M_{1}–M_{3} | >10,000 |
| M_{4}, M_{5} | ND |
| I_{1} | ND |
| σ_{1}, σ_{2} | ND |
| TAAR1 | ND |
| SERT | >10,000 (K_{i}) >50,000 (IC_{50}); ND (EC_{50}) |
| NET | >10,000 (K_{i}); ND (IC_{50}); ND (EC_{50}) |
| DAT | >10,000 (K_{i}) >100,000 (IC_{50}); ND (EC_{50}) |
| MAO-A | >10,000 (K_{i}) |
Notes: The smaller the value, the more avidly the drug binds to the site. All proteins are human unless otherwise specified. Refs:

Ariadne is a potent and selective agonist of the serotonin 5-HT_{2} receptors, including of the serotonin 5-HT_{2A}, 5-HT_{2B}, and 5-HT_{2C} receptors. However, it is less efficacious in activating the serotonin 5-HT_{2A} receptor, including the G_{q}, G_{11}, and β-arrestin2 signaling pathways, compared to the related drug DOM, and this weaker partial agonism may be responsible for its lack of psychedelic effects. In addition to the serotonin 5-HT_{2} receptors, Ariadne is a lower-affinity agonist of the serotonin 5-HT_{1} receptors. Ariadne shows essentially no activity at the monoamine transporters.

Ariadne shows a markedly attenuated head-twitch response, a behavioral proxy of psychedelic effects, in animals, although it does still significantly induce a weak head-twitch response. The drug substitutes for DOM in rodent drug discrimination tests, albeit with dramatically lower potency than DOx drugs like DOM itself, DOET, and DOB. It has also been shown to produce stimulus generalization in rats trained to respond to LSD and MDMA. Ariadne's capacity to fully substitute for MDMA is not shared with DOM and is unusual among psychedelics, but is shared with α-ethyltryptamine (αET). In monkeys, Ariadne was found to possibly increase motivation, as it caused monkeys that had stopped running mazes to begin running them again. Ariadne has also been found to be effective in an animal model of Parkinson's disease, where it reversed motor deficits similarly to levodopa.

Serotonin 5-HT_{2A} receptor agonists have been found to increase dopamine levels in the nucleus accumbens and other mesolimbic areas. Non-hallucinogenic serotonin 5-HT_{2A} receptor agonists like Ariadne may produce this effect without causing psychedelic effects. This action may underlie the preliminary observations of effectiveness of Ariadne in the treatment of parkinsonism in animals and humans.

== Chemistry ==
Ariadne, also known as 4-methyl-2,5-dimethoxy-α-ethylphenethylamine, is a substituted phenethylamine and amphetamine derivative. It is the analogue of 2,5-dimethoxy-4-methylamphetamine (DOM) in which the α-methyl group has been replaced with an α-ethyl group and is the analogue of 2,5-dimethoxy-4-methylphenethylamine (2C-D) with an ethyl group substituted at the α carbon.

=== Synthesis ===
The chemical synthesis of Ariadne has been described.

=== Analogues ===
Other related compounds include the 4C derivatives 4C-B (homologue of 2C-B and DOB), 4C-I (homologue of 2C-I and DOI), 4C-P (homologue of 2C-P and DOPR), 4C-T-2 (homologue of 2C-T-2 and Aleph-2), and 4C-TFM (homologue of 2C-TFM and DOTFM), among others. Unlike Ariadne, 4C-B has been reported to produce pronounced psychedelic effects, although generally milder than those of 2C-B or DOB. A higher homologue of Ariadne is 5C-D.

== History ==
Ariadne was first synthesized by Alexander Shulgin in 1968 and he discovered its psychoactive effects in 1969. He introduced it to Bristol Laboratories and they began clinical trials of the drug for various medical uses in 1974. Shulgin disclosed an anecdote in which he had convinced the board of directors of the company to try it themselves before initiating clinical trials. The drug was evaluated as an antidepressant, for increasing mental alertness in geriatric individuals, treating Parkinson's disease, and treating psychosis and manic depression. The tentative commercial name of Ariadne was Dimoxamine. (R)-Ariadne was said to have completed phase 2 clinical trials and to have reached phase 3 trials, but the actual clinical data were never disclosed and further development was halted due to strategic economic reasons. However, according to journalist Hamilton Morris, the United States Central Intelligence Agency (CIA) may have had involvement in the discontinuation of Ariadne's development.

== Society and culture ==
=== Names ===
Ariadne's alternative name 4C-DOM or 4C-D stands for "four-carbon DOM", whereas the name of 2C-D stands for "two-carbon DOM". Another name of Ariadne is α-Et-2C-D, which stands for α-ethyl-2C-D. Racemic Ariadne is additionally known by the former developmental code name BL-3912, while the (R)-enantiomer of Ariadne (R)-Ariadne, is known by the former developmental code name BL-3912A.

=== Legal status ===
==== Canada ====
Ariadne may be a controlled substance in Canada under phenethylamine blanket-ban language.

==== United States ====
Ariadne is not an explicitly controlled substance in the United States as of 2011. However, as a positional isomer of DOET, it can be considered and is listed as a Schedule I controlled substance in this country similarly.

== See also ==
- 4C (psychedelics)
- Non-hallucinogenic 5-HT_{2A} receptor agonist
- Stimulant § Serotonin 5-HT_{2A} receptor agonists
- Motivation-enhancing drug § Serotonin 5-HT_{2A} receptor agonists
- 5C-D (5C-DOM; α-propyl-2C-D)
- ASR-2001 (2CB-5PrO)
- AB-300
- DOET
- N-Methyl-DOET
- Thiobuscaline
