= Head-twitch response =

Head movement in rodents upon 5-HT2A receptor activation

Video of the head-twitch response in a mouse after injection with 3 mg/kg DPT hydrochloride, recorded by Hamilton Morris

The head-twitch response (HTR), also sometimes known as wet dog shakes (WDS) in rats, is a rapid side-to-side head movement that occurs in mice and rats in association with serotonin 5-HT_{2A} receptor activation. Serotonergic psychedelics like lysergic acid diethylamide (LSD) and psilocybin consistently induce the HTR in rodents, whereas non-hallucinogenic serotonin 5-HT_{2A} receptor agonists do not. Because of this, the HTR is widely employed in scientific research as an animal behavioral model of hallucinogen effects and in the discovery of new psychedelic drugs.

The HTR is one of the only behavioral paradigms for assessment of psychedelic-like effects in animals, with the other most notable test being drug discrimination. However, the HTR is far less costly and less time-consuming than drug discrimination and hence has become much more popular in recent years. Limitations of the HTR include the fact that various other drugs besides serotonin 5-HT_{2A} receptor agonists, such as NMDA receptor antagonists and muscarinic acetylcholine receptor antagonists, also induce the HTR, and certain indirect non-hallucinogenic serotonin 5-HT_{2A} receptor activators, like 5-hydroxytryptophan (5-HTP) and serotonin releasers, induce the response as well. While a useful test, it should not be regarded as a definitive predictor of human psychedelic potential.

The HTR was first described as an effect of psychedelics in the mid-1950s. It was subsequently proposed as a behavioral test of psychedelic-like effects in 1967. The HTR became widely used as a test of psychedelic-like effects by the mid-2000s. Automated versions of the HTR test, allowing for high-throughput screening, were developed in the 2010s and 2020s.

== Description ==
The HTR is a rapid, rhythmic side-to-side or rotational head movement that intermittently occurs in mice and rats in association with central serotonin 5-HT_{2A} receptor activation. In mice, each individual head movement lasts about 10 milliseconds and each HTR consists of 5 to 11 individual head movements. The HTR is spontaneous and irregularly occurring over the drug's duration. Head twitches also occur naturally in rodents but occur at low frequencies and are only rarely observed in non-stimulated animals. Drugs inducing the HTR cause the frequency to increase by many orders of magnitude above the spontaneous rate. Within a 10-minute period, between 4 and 68 head twitches have been observed following administration of DOI, depending on the dose, enantiomer, and rodent species and strain. The head twitches produced by HTR-inducing drugs are identical to spontaneous head twitches and to touch-induced head twitches (also known as the pinna reflex).

In rats, the HTR is also sometimes known instead as wet dog shakes (WDS). This is because the response in rats can involve more of the whole body instead of just the head shaking and can resemble the shaking of dogs coming out of water. On account of the preceding, the test has also been referred to as the head-twitch response/wet dog shake (HTR/WDS) test.

Serotonin 5-HT_{2A} receptor agonists show an inverted U-shaped dose–response curve for induction of the HTR in terms of its frequency. Tolerance rapidly develops to the induction of the HTR with many but not all serotonergic psychedelics. More specifically, tolerance has been observed with LSD, DOB, DOI, 2C-T-7, 25CN-NBOH, and 5-MeO-AMT, but not with DPT or DiPT. Development of tolerance to the HTR and other serotonin 5-HT_{2A} receptor agonist effects in animals parallels the rapid development of tolerance to the hallucinogenic effects of many psychedelics in humans, including LSD, DOM, psilocybin, and mescaline, among others. Conversely, similarly to the HTR with DPT and DiPT, tolerance does not appear to develop to the psychedelic effects of DMT, ayahuasca (which contains DMT), or 5-MeO-DMT in humans. However, more recent clinical studies employing DMT by continuous intravenous infusion (also known as DMTx) have found rapid and moderate acute tolerance development with DMT. Time-dependent supersensitivity to the HTR in animals has also been reported, for instance with DOI.

The effective doses (ED_{50}) of numerous serotonergic psychedelics in producing the HTR have been reviewed as well as correlated with human psychedelic doses.

Different psychedelic and related drugs show differences in efficacy in inducing the HTR, which is quantified by number of or maximal head twitches in a given time period. Although potency in inducing the HTR strongly correlates with hallucinogenic doses in humans, it is unclear whether magnitude of HTR can be considered a proxy of degree of psychedelic effects, for instance ranging from mild to strong hallucinogenic effects, as this subject has not been rigorously assessed. It is notable in this regard that psilocin shows a similar maximal HTR as the non-hallucinogenic Ariadne and related compounds (both ~15–25 head twitches per 15 minutes). Consequently, cautious interpretation of HTR degree is required, for instance when comparing it across different chemical scaffolds or when assessing novel drugs with no human data.

The HTR is also known to occur in rabbits and certain mole-like shrews such as the least shrew. Conversely, it does not occur in other species like primates or humans. However, HTR-like behaviors are also induced by psychedelics in certain other animal species, for instance cats and stump-tailed macaque monkeys. Other related behaviors to head twitches induced by serotonergic agents in animals include ear scratching in mice, limb jerks or flicks in cats, head bobs in rabbits, and body scratches. However, other behaviors induced by psychedelics may not be as reliable as the HTR. In addition, ear scratches appear to be mediated primarily by activation of the serotonin 5-HT_{2C} receptor rather than by activation of the serotonin 5-HT_{2A} receptor. On the other hand, psychedelic-induced head bobs in rabbits appear to be mediated specifically by central serotonin 5-HT_{2A} receptor activation.

== Procedure ==
The HTR method is reliable, straightforward, and simple to perform in that it merely involves direct behavioral observation following drug administration. No animal training or expensive equipment are necessarily required. The HTR can be measured in a single animal or a group of animals and can be observed in real-time or via video-recording and later observation. It can also be recorded via a magnet attached to the head or ear.

DOI is the most commonly used psychedelic to induce the HTR. DOI and other psychedelics show a biphasic or inverted U-shaped dose–response curve in terms of HTR induction. For example, no HTR is observed at 0.1 mg/kg DOI, maximal HTR is observed at 1 to 10 mg/kg, and lesser HTR is observed at 3 to 20 mg/kg in rodents. The doses can vary depending on the rodent species and strain. Hence, based on the preceding, proper drug dosing is important for induction of the HTR.

A drawback of the HTR assay is that manual observation can be very laborious and time-consuming. More recently however, semi- and fully-automated forms of the assay, notably allowing for the possibility of high-throughput screening, have been developed.

== Mechanisms ==
The HTR produced by serotonergic psychedelics, which act as non-selective serotonin receptor agonists, appears to be mediated specifically by agonism of the serotonin 5-HT_{2A} receptor. Selective and non-selective serotonin 5-HT_{2A} antagonists, like volinanserin (M100907), can block production of the HTR by serotonergic psychedelics. Similarly, the HTR of psychedelics is absent in serotonin 5-HT_{2A} receptor knockout mice. Restoration of the serotonin 5-HT_{2A} receptor to cortical neurons in these knockout mice can restore the HTR. The intracellular signaling cascade activated by the serotonin 5-HT_{2A} receptor to produce the HTR appears to be the G_{q} pathway. Relatedly, there are robust correlations between serotonin 5-HT_{2A} receptor G_{q} efficacy and magnitude of the HTR among psychedelic drugs. However, the responsible cascades have not been definitively elucidated, and other pathways, such as the G_{s} and β-arrestin2 pathways, have also been implicated in other studies.

The HTR is mediated by central serotonin 5-HT_{2A} receptor activation. Hence, if a given serotonin 5-HT_{2A} receptor agonist produces the HTR, this can be considered evidence that the drug is able to cross the blood–brain barrier and exert central effects. Activation of serotonin 5-HT_{2A} receptors in the medial prefrontal cortex (mPFC), with layer V pyramidal neurons especially implicated and with subsequent release of glutamate in this area, may be the origin of the HTR. However, other brain areas have also been independently implicated. For example, local injection of serotonergic psychedelics into the claustrum produces wet dog shakes (i.e., the HTR) in rats as well. Serotonin 5-HT_{2A} and metabotropic glutamate mGlu_{2} receptor heterodimeric complexes may or may not be important for induction of the HTR by psychedelics, with research findings in this area being conflicting. Subsequent research by Bryan L. Roth and colleagues found no evidence for direction interaction of the serotonin 5-HT_{2A} receptor and the metabotropic glutamate mGlu_{2} receptor in vitro or in vivo.

The HTR is said to resemble a strong pinna reflex involving the whole head. The pinna reflex can be elicited by tactile stimulation, for example stimulation of the ear by a fine hair. In the case of the HTR however, the reflex occurs without tactile stimulation. The HTR induced by the serotonin precursor 5-hydroxytryptophan (5-HTP) has been found to be sensitive to environmental interference by background noise and can be prevented by local anesthesia of the pinna (outer part of the ear). These findings suggest that the HTR might be due specifically to disturbances of auditory sensory processing, although more research is needed to confirm this possibility.

The reasons for the biphasic or inverted U-shaped dose–response curve with psychedelics are unknown. However, activation of serotonin 5-HT_{2C} and 5-HT_{1A} receptors at higher doses appears to at least partly be involved. In contrast to the HTR, frontal cortex inositol monophosphate (IP_{1}) turnover due to serotonin 5-HT_{2A} receptor activation, which is associated with the hallucinogenic effects of serotonergic psychedelics, has an asymptotic dose–response curve akin to a saturation curve. Based on these findings, it was suggested that psychedelics may continue to increase serotonin 5-HT_{2A} receptor activation at higher doses but that behavioral disruption limits the expression of the HTR.

Tolerance and tachyphylaxis to the HTR and/or other effects of serotonergic psychedelics may be mediated by serotonin 5-HT_{2A} receptor downregulation. LSD, psilocin, DOM, DOI, and DOB have all been found to reduce the density of brain serotonin 5-HT_{2A} receptors in animals in vivo and/or to desensitize the receptor in transfected cell lines, and this downregulation has been found to recover very slowly. LSD has also been specifically shown to reduce brain serotonin 5-HT_{2A} receptor signaling in animals. Conversely however, DMT, which is not associated with tolerance development in humans, did not desensitize the serotonin 5-HT_{2A} receptor in cell lines. Activation of the serotonin 5-HT_{2A} receptor β-arrestin2 pathway may mediate serotonin 5-HT_{2A} receptor internalization and tolerance. However, findings are conflicting, as β-arrestin2 knockout mice still showed tolerance to the HTR induced by DOI. It is also notable that, in contrast to most G protein-coupled receptors (GPCRs), serotonin 5-HT_{2A} receptor downregulation has been found to occur in response to both agonists and antagonists of the receptor. Besides serotonin 5-HT_{2A} receptor downregulation, tolerance to psychedelics may also develop due to adaptations in downstream glutamate receptors. An alternative possibility to serotonin 5-HT_{2A} receptor biased agonism is that the lack of tolerance with drugs like DMT may simply be due to their very short durations. Accordingly, more recent clinical studies employing DMT by continuous intravenous infusion (also known as DMTx) have found rapid and moderate acute tolerance development with DMT.

== Scientific validity ==
Head twitches do not occur with psychedelics in humans or many other species. In addition, they lack face validity as an animal behavioral proxy of psychedelic effects, in that they bear little resemblance to the human psychedelic experience. In any case, it has been said that head twitches might be a behavioral response to sensory disturbances during hallucinogenic experiences. On the other hand, many drugs that are not hallucinogenic in humans also induce the HTR. Despite the preceding limitations, the assay has strong predictive validity for hallucinogenic effects of serotonin 5-HT_{2A} receptor agonists in humans. There is a strong correlation between the capacity of serotonergic psychedelics to induce head twitches in rodents and their reported potency in inducing hallucinogenic effects in humans. The HTR is easily quantifiable and there is high agreement in counts between independent observers. In addition, there is a low level of within-subject and between-subject variability in induction of the HTR in animals. Nonetheless, while the HTR assay is useful in assessing target engagement, it should not be regarded as a definitive predictor of psychedelic potential.

== Exceptions ==
=== Psychedelics lacking head twitches in animals ===
There are few or no known examples of serotonergic psychedelics with hallucinogenic effects in humans that do not produce the HTR in animals. It was suggested that one of the only observed exceptions, the LSD prodrug ALD-52 (1-acetyl-LSD), could be explained by species differences in metabolism. However, subsequent research found that ALD-52 actually does produce the HTR. Other possible exceptions, including various 2C psychedelics like 2C-B, 2C-I, and 2C-D, as well as the phenylpiperazine TFMPP, may be explained by these agents having relatively low intrinsic activity at the serotonin 5-HT_{2A} receptor and by species differences in sensitivity to HTR elicitation by serotonin 5-HT_{2A} receptor partial agonists (mice being more sensitive than rats). Dimethyltryptamine (DMT) shows effects on the HTR in mice that are highly strain-dependent, including producing an HTR comparable to other psychedelics, producing an HTR that is much weaker than that of other psychedelics, or producing no HTR at all. These conflicting results may be due to rapid metabolism of DMT and/or other peculiarities of DMT in different species.

In contrast to serotonergic psychedelics, oneirogens like harmine and ibogaine do not produce the HTR in rodents.

=== Non-psychedelics inducing head twitches ===
The HTR can be non-specific and can have false positives, with head twitches also produced by some drugs that do not act through serotonin 5-HT_{2} receptors. Examples of these agents include NMDA receptor antagonists like phencyclidine (PCP), certain benzodiazepines and Z-drugs like estazolam, triazolam, and zopiclone, α_{2}-adrenergic receptor antagonists like yohimbine, muscarinic acetylcholine receptor antagonists like atropine and scopolamine, serotonin 5-HT_{1A} receptor antagonists like WAY-100635 and UH-301, and CB_{1} receptor antagonists like rimonabant. In the cases of benzodiazepines, rimonabant, and serotonin 5-HT_{1A} receptor antagonists however, this effect appeared to be mediated by indirect or direct activation of serotonin 5-HT_{2A} receptors. Acute lithium administration induces the HTR via increased serotonin release in rodents, whereas chronic administration blunts head twitches in response to psychedelics. A number of other drugs, including the acetylcholine receptor agonist carbachol, opioids, and thyrotropin-releasing hormone (TRH) among others, have also been reported to induce the HTR.

Drugs such as the serotonin precursors tryptophan and 5-hydroxytryptophan (5-HTP), serotonin releasing agents (SRAs) like fenfluramine and para-chloroamphetamine (PCA), and other agents like 1-methylpsilocin and 3,4-dimethoxyphenethylamine (DMPEA) stimulate serotonin receptors and can produce head twitches, but are not known to be hallucinogenic in humans. However, at least in the case of 5-HTP, this could be just be due to the very high doses required. It is notable in this regard that hallucinations are reported in a subset of cases of serotonin syndrome, although it is unclear at the present time whether these hallucinations are psychedelic in nature or are of a different etiology. While the SRA and mixed entactogen and psychedelic MDA likewise induces the HTR, findings are mixed and conflicting for the SRA and less hallucinogenic MDMA. The SRA dexfenfluramine produces wet dog shakes in rats, whereas the serotonin reuptake inhibitor fluoxetine has little or no effect on wet dog shakes. Amphetamine as well as para-hydroxyamphetamine (given intracerebroventricularly) can also elicit the HTR at sufficiently high doses.

The preceding findings collectively suggest that while the HTR can be a useful indicator as to whether a compound is likely to display hallucinogenic activity in humans, the induction of the HTR does not necessarily mean that a compound will be hallucinogenic. In relation to this, caution should be exercised when interpreting such results.

=== Non-hallucinogenic serotonin 5-HT_{2A} receptor agonists ===
Some serotonin 5-HT_{2A} receptor agonists, including lisuride, 2-bromo-LSD (bromolysergide; BOL-148), ergotamine, 6-fluoro-DET, 6-MeO-DMT, Ariadne, zalsupindole (DLX-001; AAZ-A-154), ITI-1549, 25N-N1-Nap, and IHCH-7086 among others, are either non-hallucinogenic or are thought to be non-hallucinogenic in spite of activating the serotonin 5-HT_{2A} receptor. The HTR is among the only animal behavioral tests that can reliably distinguish between hallucinogenic and non-hallucinogenic serotonin 5-HT_{2A} receptor agonists. Although lisuride and other non-hallucinogenic serotonin 5-HT_{2A} receptor agonists do not produce the HTR in rodents, lisuride does produce the HTR in the least shrew, a non-rodent species that is said to be highly sensitive to serotonin 5-HT_{2A} receptor agonists. In any case, it is thought that partial agonism with sufficiently low efficacy for specific intracellular signaling pathways underlies the lack of HTR and psychedelic effects with non-hallucinogenic serotonin 5-HT_{2A} receptor agonists. However, other findings suggest that ergotamine may be non-hallucinogenic due to inability to efficiently cross the blood–brain barrier and peripheral selectivity, while lisuride and 2-bromo-LSD may actually be variably hallucinogenic at sufficiently high doses.

Serotonin administered by intracerebroventricular injection at high doses produces the HTR in animals. However, serotonin itself has been considered to be non-hallucinogenic in humans. This would be in accordance with the lack of inherent psychedelic effects with serotonin releasing agents, serotonin reuptake inhibitors, and serotonin precursors in humans. The HTR with high doses of serotonin in animals appears to be mediated by formation of more lipophilic N-methylated psychedelic metabolites of serotonin, like bufotenin (N,N-dimethylserotonin).

=== Others ===
Surprisingly, the HTR induced by the mescaline-related psychedelic drug methallylescaline (MAL) was blocked by the selective serotonin 5-HT_{2C} receptor antagonist SB-242084 but not by the serotonin 5-HT_{2A} receptor antagonist ketanserin. This was in contrast to the case of the 2C and BOx psychedelic BOD (β-methoxy-2C-D) in the same study, for which both ketanserin and SB-242084 blocked the HTR. These findings suggest an involvement of the serotonin 5-HT_{2C} receptor and not the serotonin 5-HT_{2A} receptor in the psychedelic-like effects of methallylescaline in rodents. In addition, they suggest that different psychedelics may differentially activate the serotonin 5-HT_{2A} and 5-HT_{2C} receptors to produce their psychedelic-like effects.

== Modulators of the head-twitch response ==
While the serotonin 5-HT_{2A} receptor mediates the HTR, other serotonin receptors, including the serotonin 5-HT_{1A} and 5-HT_{2C} receptors, appear to modulate the serotonin 5-HT_{2A} receptor-induced HTR. Serotonin 5-HT_{1A} receptor agonists like 8-OH-DPAT suppress the HTR, while serotonin 5-HT_{1A} receptor antagonists can augment it. In addition, LSM-775, which is a weakly hallucinogenic psychedelic in humans, does not induce the HTR in animals unless the serotonin 5-HT_{1A} receptor is blocked with WAY-100635, suggesting that serotonin 5-HT_{1A} receptor activation masks its psychedelic-like effects. The serotonin 5-HT_{1A} receptor agonist buspirone has been reported to suppress the hallucinogenic effects of serotonergic psychedelics in humans, while the serotonin 5-HT_{1A} receptor antagonist pindolol has been reported to robustly potentiate them. However, paradoxically, whereas the serotonin 5-HT_{1A} receptor full agonist 8-OH-DPAT suppresses the HTR induced by 5-hydroxytryptophan (5-HTP) or DOI, buspirone, a serotonin 5-HT_{1A} receptor partial agonist, has been shown to enhance the HTR induced by 5-HTP plus pargyline.

Serotonin 5-HT_{2C} receptor agonists, for instance Ro 60-0175, CP-809,101, and meta-chlorophenylpiperazine (mCPP), have been reported to suppress the HTR, while serotonin 5-HT_{2C} receptor antagonists, like SB-242084, have been reported to potentiate the HTR. However, in some studies, serotonin 5-HT_{2C} receptor inactivation, by antagonism with SB-242084 or SB-206553 or by receptor knockout, has been reported to diminish the HTR. The reasons for these contradictory findings are unclear. In any case, animal strain differences have been suggested. In addition, the influence of serotonin 5-HT_{2C} receptor signaling on the HTR may be bimodal, with a more recent study finding that the serotonin 5-HT_{2C} receptor antagonist RS-102221 enhanced the HTR at lower doses but inhibited it at higher doses. The possible influence of serotonin 5-HT_{2B} receptor signaling on the HTR has been little-studied and is largely unknown. However, a subsequent study found that the highly selective 5-HT_{2B} receptor antagonist RS-127445 diminished the HTR induced by LSD in rats but not in mice.

A number of other drugs have also been found to modulate the HTR. Monoamine oxidase inhibitors (MAOIs) like harmine, iproniazid, pargyline, clorgyline, and tranylcypromine have been found to potentiate the HTR induced by serotonergic psychedelics and other serotonergic agents without inducing the HTR on their own. This is the case even with psychedelics that are not themselves monoamine oxidase (MAO) substrates, indicating that the potentiation is not simply due to inhibition of their metabolism. In contrast to MAOIs, serotonin reuptake inhibitors (SRIs), including citalopram, fluoxetine, fluvoxamine, and imipramine, do not affect the HTR induced by DOI. Conversely, serotonin transporter (SERT) knockout greatly reduces or even eliminates the psychedelic-induced HTR. This may be due to elevated serotonin levels and decreased serotonin 5-HT_{2A} receptor expression. Unlike SRIs, chronic administration of serotonin–norepinephrine reuptake inhibitors (SNRIs) has been found to decrease the DOI-induced HTR. Relatedly, activation of the α_{2}-adrenergic receptor has been found to suppress the HTR with psychedelics and serotonin releasing agents. The norepinephrine reuptake inhibitor (NRI) reboxetine blocks MDMA-induced norepinephrine release and has been found to unmask the HTR with MDMA, whereas co-administration of psilocybin and reboxetine suppressed psilocybin-induced HTR. Along similar lines, the α_{2}-adrenergic receptor antagonist atipamezole did not induce an HTR on its own but allowed MDMA to induce the HTR, whereas the α_{2}-adrenergic receptor agonist guanfacine suppressed MDMA- and psilocybin-induced HTR. Serotonin depletion has been found to potentiate the HTR. This appears to be related to increased postsynaptic serotonin 5-HT_{2} receptors.

A variety of other agents, including the β-adrenergic receptor agonist clenbuterol, AMPA receptor antagonists like tezampanel (LY-293558), metabotropic glutamate mGlu_{2} and mGlu_{3} receptor agonists like eglumegad and LY-379268, antipsychotics like haloperidol, antihistamines, μ-opioid receptor agonists like morphine, methadone, and pethidine, adenosine A_{1} receptor agonists like N^{6}-cyclopentyladenosine, and the TAAR1 antagonist EPPTB, have been reported to inhibit the HTR induced by serotonergic psychedelics and/or other serotonergic agents in animals. Conversely, the metabotropic glutamate mGlu_{2} and mGlu_{3} receptor antagonist LY-341495 has been found to potentiate the psychedelic-induced HTR. Selective dopamine D_{3} receptor agonists like WC-44 and WW-III-55 suppress the HTR induced by DOI. The anticonvulsant phenytoin potentiates the HTR. NMDA receptor antagonists like phencyclidine (PCP), ketamine, and dizocilpine (MK-801) have been found to enhance the DOI-induced HTR as well.

== History ==
Drugs inducing HTR from Corne & Pickering (1967)
| Drug | ED_{50} (mg/kg s.c.) | Time to max effect (min) | Drug class |
|---|---|---|---|
| LSD | 0.045 | 9–11 | Psychedelic |
| MLD-41 | 0.074 | 4–6 | Psychedelic |
| Ergometrine | 10 | 14–16 | Psychedelic |
| Psilocin | 1.3 | 4–6 | Psychedelic |
| Psilocybin | 1.1 | 4–6 | Psychedelic |
| DMT | 2.8 | 2–4 | Psychedelic |
| Bufotenin | 15 | 14–16 | Psychedelic |
| AMT | 7.9 | 44–46 | Psychedelic |
| 5-HTP | 75 | 9–11 | Serotonin precursor |
| Mescaline | 9.6 | 19–21 | Psychedelic |
| TMA | 11 | 14–16 | Psychedelic |
| α-Ethylmescaline | ~20 | 14–16 | Psychedelic |
| DMPEA | 15 | 9–31 | Psychedelic |
| Scopolamine | 4.2 | 9–11 | Antimuscarinic |
| Atropine | 8.9 | 2–16 | Antimuscarinic |
| Trihexyphenidyl | 7.6 | 14–16 | Antimuscarinic |
| Ditran | 11 | 4–6 | Antimuscarinic |
| Phencyclidine | 0.36 | 4–21 | NMDAR antagonist |
| Yohimbine | 8.4 | 14–31 | α_{2}R antagonist |
Notes: Drugs that did not produce the HTR in the study included ALD-52, BOL-148, ergotamine, methysergide, αET, serotonin, nalorphine, atropine methylnitrate, amphetamine, epinephrine, α-propylmescaline, α-butylmescaline, pheniprazine, tranylcypromine, acetylcholine, histamine, bradykinin, and hypertonic saline.

The HTR was first described as an effect induced by LSD, independently by Winter and Flataker and by Keller and Umbreit, in 1956. Subsequently, it was described as an effect of large doses of 5-HTP, by Corne, Pickering, and Warner, in 1963. At first, the HTR was just a pharmacological curiosity and was not used as a tool in scientific research. In 1967 however, Corne and Pickering demonstrated the influence of a wide range of drugs on the HTR and proposed the HTR as a behavioral predictor of hallucinogenic effects in humans. The reliability of the HTR for identifying psychedelics is said to have been established by the mid-1970s. However, it has been said that the HTR test did not become widely used in studying serotonin 5-HT_{2A} receptor activation until the mid-2000s.

Studies published in the 1960s and 1970s had shown that serotonin receptor antagonists, such as cinanserin, methysergide, and cyproheptadine, blocked the hallucinogen-like effects of psychedelics in animals. Mediation of the HTR specifically via serotonin 5-HT_{2} receptor agonism was first proposed by Peroutka, Lebovitz, and Snyder in 1981, followed by supporting studies by Ortmann and colleagues in 1982 and Leysen and colleagues also in 1982. Richard Glennon and colleagues further supported mediation of the hallucinogen-like effects of psychedelics by serotonin 5-HT_{2} receptor agonism with subsequent studies, for instance employing drug discrimination, in 1983 and thereafter. However, the role of the serotonin 5-HT_{2A} receptor in the mediation of psychedelic-like effects, including the HTR, was not conclusively validated until studies with serotonin 5-HT_{2A} receptor knockout mice were published in 2003. It was found in 1985 that the non-hallucinogenic serotonin receptor agonist lisuride did not produce the HTR in animals and could antagonize the HTR induced by other drugs, leading to the suggestion that it was a low-efficacy partial agonist of the serotonin 5-HT_{2} receptors.

Automation of the HTR assay was first described by Adam Halberstadt and colleagues in 2013. They developed a semi-automated assay using magnetometer-based detection. de la Fuente Revenga and colleagues developed a fully automated HTR test based on Halberstadt's work and published their system in 2019. Additional automated HTR systems, including ones employing deep learning techniques, were developed in 2020 and thereafter.

== Other tests ==
The only other behavioral paradigms for assessment of psychedelic-like effects in animals at present are drug discrimination (DD) and, to a lesser extent, prepulse inhibition (PPI) and time perception. However, the HTR is far less costly and less time-consuming than drug discrimination and hence has become much more popular in recent years. Other paradigms for assessing psychedelic-associated effects have also been studied but have not shown satisfactory consistency for general use. In the 2020s, a test of psychedelic-induced visual distortions in animals was published. This study marked the first evidence of psychedelic-induced visual distortions in animals. However, a much earlier test of psychedelic-related visual changes, described by the late 1960s, was a visual object size discrimination task in monkeys.

== See also ==
- Drug discrimination
