= 3',4'-Methylenedioxy-α-pyrrolidinobutiophenone =

Stimulant drug

MDPBP

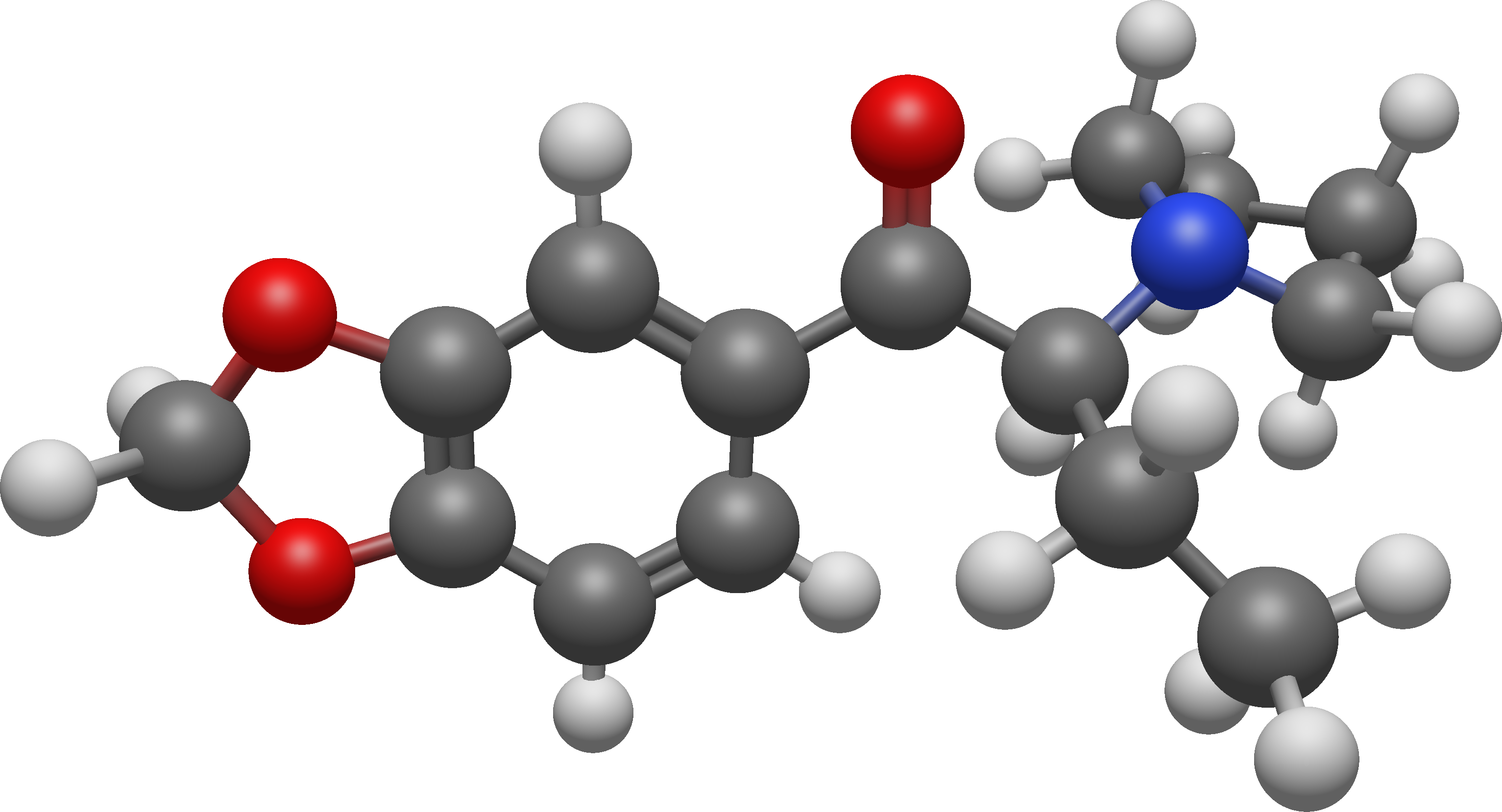

Legal status
- Legal status: CA: Schedule I; DE: NpSG (Industrial and scientific use only); UK: Class B; Illegal in China and Poland

Identifiers
- IUPAC name: 1-(2H-1,3-Benzodioxol-5-yl)-2-(pyrrolidin-1-yl)butan-1-one
- CAS Number: 784985-33-7
- PubChem CID: 71300672
- ChemSpider: 52084589
- UNII: 979L917V7T
- ChEBI: CHEBI:234466
- CompTox Dashboard (EPA): DTXSID101024630

Chemical and physical data
- Formula: C_{15}H_{19}NO_{3}
- Molar mass: 261.321 g·mol^{−1}
- 3D model (JSmol): Interactive image
- SMILES: CCC(C(=O)C1=CC2=C(C=C1)OCO2)N3CCCC3
- InChI: InChI=1S/C15H19NO3/c1-2-12(16-7-3-4-8-16)15(17)11-5-6-13-14(9-11)19-10-18-13/h5-6,9,12H,2-4,7-8,10H2,1H3; Key:OLVLMDVPMCIBQW-UHFFFAOYSA-N

3',4'-Methylenedioxy-α-pyrrolidinobutyrophenone (MDPBP) is a stimulant of the cathinone class developed in the 1960s, which has been reported as a novel designer drug. MDPBP is sometimes sold under the name "NRG-1" as a mixture with other cathinone derivatives, including flephedrone, pentylone, MαPPP and its higher homologue MDPV. As with other cathinones, MDPBP has been shown to have reinforcing effects in rats.

The main metabolic steps are thought to be demethylenation followed by methylation of one hydroxy group, aromatic and side chain hydroxylation, oxidation of the pyrrolidine ring to the corresponding lactam as well as ring opening to the corresponding carboxylic acid. CYP2C19 and CYP2D6 have been identified as the isoenzymes mainly responsible for demethylenation.

== Legal status ==
As of October 2015 MDPBP is a controlled substance in Poland and China.

== See also ==
- Substituted methylenedioxyphenethylamine
- α-Pyrrolidinobutiophenone (α-PBP)
- Butylone
- 3',4'-Methylenedioxy-α-pyrrolidinopropiophenone (MDPPP)
- Methylenedioxypyrovalerone (MDPV)
