= Ethyl group =

Chemical group (–CH2–CH3)

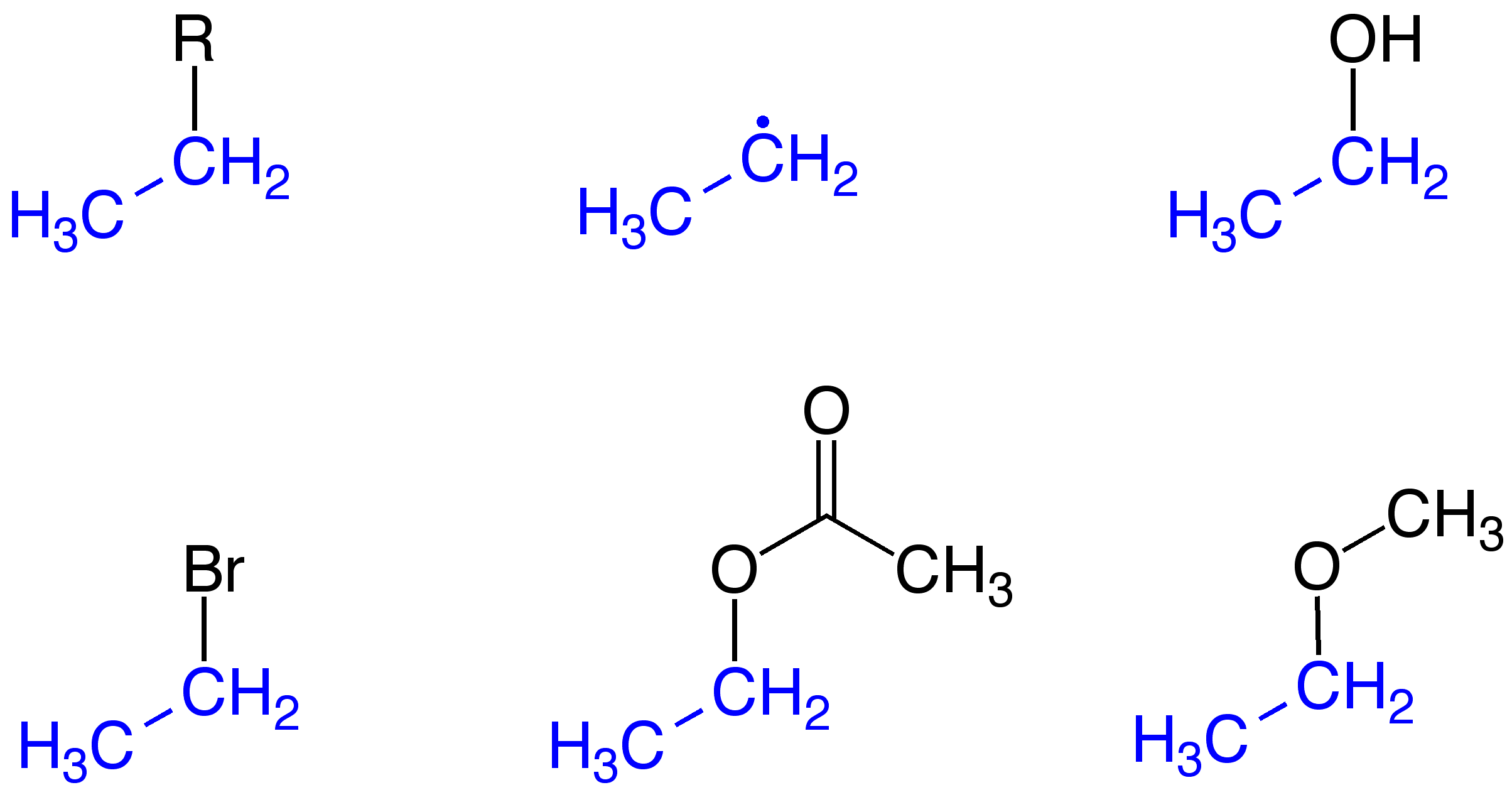
Ethyl group (highlighted blue) as part of a molecule, as the ethyl radical and in the compounds ethanol, bromoethane, ethyl acetate and ethyl methyl ether.

In organic chemistry, an ethyl group (abbreviated as ET, Et or et) is an alkyl substituent with the formula −CH_{2}CH_{3}, derived from ethane (C_{2}H_{6}).

Ethyl is used in the International Union of Pure and Applied Chemistry's nomenclature of organic chemistry for a saturated two-carbon moiety in a molecule, while the prefix "eth-" is used to indicate the presence of two carbon atoms in the molecule.

== Ethylation ==
Ethylation is the formation of a compound by introduction of the ethyl group. The most widely practiced example of this reaction is the ethylation of benzene with ethylene to yield ethylbenzene, a precursor to styrene, which is a precursor to polystyrene. Approximately 24.7 million tons of ethylbenzene were produced in 1999.

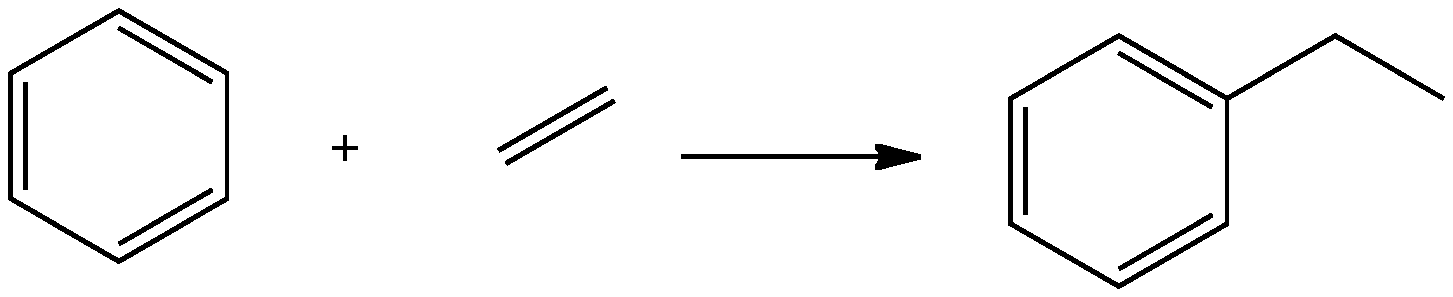

Many ethyl-containing compounds are generated by electrophilic ethylation, i.e. treatment of nucleophiles with sources of Et^{+}. Triethyloxonium tetrafluoroborate [Et_{3}O]BF_{4} is such a reagent. For good nucleophiles, less electrophilic reagents are employed, such as ethyl halides.

== Stereochemistry ==
In unsymmetrical ethylated compounds, the methylene protons in the ethyl substituent are diastereotopic. Chiral reagents are known to stereoselectively modify such substituents.

== Etymology ==
The name of the group is derived from the Aether, the first-born Greek elemental god of air (and at that time a general term for any highly volatile compound) and "hyle", referring to "stuff". The name "ethyl" was coined in 1835 by the Swedish chemist Jöns Jacob Berzelius.

== See also ==
- Functional group
