= C10H13NO3 =

The molecular formula C_{10}H_{13}NO_{3} (molar mass : 195.22 g/mol) may refer to:

- N-Acetyldopamine
- AMPT
- Benzodioxolylhydroxybutanamine
- Damascenine
- Methoxymethylenedioxyphenethylamine
  - Lophophine
  - 2C-MMDA-2
  - 2C-MMDA-3a
- 3,4-Dihydroxymethcathinone
- Methylenedioxyhydroxyamphetamine
- Metirosine
