= 2C-B-OH =

Clinical data
- Other names: 4-Bromo-2,5-dimethoxy-N-hydroxyphenethylamine; 2,5-Dimethoxy-4-bromo-N-hydroxyphenethylamine; N-Hydroxy-4-bromo-2,5-dimethoxyphenethylamine; N-Hydroxy-2C-B
- ATC code: None

Identifiers
- IUPAC name: N-[2-(4-bromo-2,5-dimethoxyphenyl)ethyl]hydroxylamine
- CAS Number: 1843217-36-6
- PubChem CID: 129849638

Chemical and physical data
- Formula: C_{10}H_{14}BrNO_{3}
- Molar mass: 276.130 g·mol^{−1}
- 3D model (JSmol): Interactive image
- SMILES: COC1=CC(=C(C=C1CCNO)OC)Br
- InChI: InChI=1S/C10H14BrNO3/c1-14-9-6-8(11)10(15-2)5-7(9)3-4-12-13/h5-6,12-13H,3-4H2,1-2H3; Key:BXSZGYIMATXPNW-UHFFFAOYSA-N

2C-B-OH, also known as 4-bromo-2,5-dimethoxy-N-hydroxyphenethylamine or as N-hydroxy-2C-B, is a chemical compound of the phenethylamine and 2C families related to the psychedelic drug 2C-B. It is the N-hydroxy derivative of 2C-B and is structurally related to the HOT-x psychedelics like HOT-2 (N-hydroxy-2C-T-2), HOT-7 (N-hydroxy-2C-T-7), and HOT-17 (N-hydroxy-2C-T-17). Unlike the HOT-x drugs however, 2C-B-OH was not included nor mentioned by Alexander Shulgin in his 1991 book PiHKAL (Phenethylamines I Have Known and Loved). The HOT-x psychedelics, as well as the MDxx entactogens MDOH (N-hydroxy-MDA) and FLEA (MDMOH; N-hydroxy-MDMA), may act as prodrugs of their N-unsubstituted analogues, for instance HOT-2 into 2C-T-2. The chemical synthesis of 2C-B-OH has been described. The drug was first described in the scientific literature by Leth-Petersen and colleagues in 2016. It is a controlled substance in Canada under phenethylamine blanket-ban language.

== See also ==
- 2C (psychedelics)
- HOT-x (psychedelics)
- N-Hydroxy-DOM
- 2C-B-AN
