= Homarylamine =

Chemical compound

Clinical data
- Other names: MDMPEA; 1,3-Benzodioxolyl-N-methyl-5-ethanamine; 3,4-Methylenedioxy-N-methyl-2-phenylethylamine; Norlobivine; METHYL-H; METHYL-MDPEA; N-Me-MDPEA

Legal status
- Legal status: US: Schedule I (as a positional isomer of MDA)

Identifiers
- IUPAC name: 2-(1,3-benzodioxol-5-yl)-N-methylethanamine
- CAS Number: 451-77-4
- PubChem CID: 10776
- ChemSpider: 10321
- UNII: 6FJ4B5B368
- ChEMBL: ChEMBL2104353
- CompTox Dashboard (EPA): DTXSID90196385

Chemical and physical data
- Formula: C_{10}H_{13}NO_{2}
- Molar mass: 179.219 g·mol^{−1}
- 3D model (JSmol): Interactive image
- SMILES: CNCCC1=CC2=C(C=C1)OCO2
- InChI: InChI=1S/C10H13NO2/c1-11-5-4-8-2-3-9-10(6-8)13-7-12-9/h2-3,6,11H,4-5,7H2,1H3; Key:OPJOMVMFYOUDPK-UHFFFAOYSA-N

Homarylamine (INN), also known as 3,4-methylenedioxy-N-methylphenethylamine (MDMPEA) or as METHYL-H, is a chemical compound of the phenethylamine and methylenedioxyphenethylamine (MDxx) family. It is the N-methyl derivative of homopiperonylamine (methylenedioxyphenethylamine; MDPEA; H). The drug was patented by Merck & Co. in 1956 and studied as an antitussive (cough suppressant) in 1961. It is a schedule I drug in the United States as a positional isomer of 3,4-methylenedioxyamphetamine (MDA).

== Use and effects ==
Homarylamine was briefly mentioned by Alexander Shulgin in his book PiHKAL (Phenethylamines I Have Known and Loved). According to Shulgin, homarylamine has been reported to be active as an antitussive (cough suppressant) at a dose of 30 mg. No central effects were described as this dose. Shulgin tried this dose and experienced a little tightness of facial muscles, but no mental effects whatsoever.

== Chemistry ==
=== Reactions ===
Reaction of homarylamine with formaldehyde gives hydrastinine.

A practical application of homarylamine is in the synthesis of Roemerin.

=== Analogues ===
Analogues of homarylamine include homopiperonylamine (MDPEA), lobivine (MDDMPEA), lophophine (MMDPEA), MDA, MDMA, hydrastine, and hydrastinine, among others.

== See also ==
- Substituted methylenedioxyphenethylamine
