= N-Hydroxyamphetamine =

Clinical data
- Other names: NOHA; HOT-A; AMPH-OH
- Drug class: Stimulant
- ATC code: None

Identifiers
- IUPAC name: N-(1-phenylpropan-2-yl)hydroxylamine
- CAS Number: 63-90-1 4490-17-9 (hydrochloride)
- PubChem CID: 65546
- ChemSpider: 58990
- UNII: A2AXB2C6CQ

Chemical and physical data
- Formula: C_{9}H_{13}NO
- Molar mass: 151.209 g·mol^{−1}
- 3D model (JSmol): Interactive image
- SMILES: CC(CC1=CC=CC=C1)NO
- InChI: InChI=1S/C9H13NO/c1-8(10-11)7-9-5-3-2-4-6-9/h2-6,8,10-11H,7H2,1H3; Key:LPZRPPBVFGJUOJ-UHFFFAOYSA-N

N-Hydroxyamphetamine (NOHA), also known as AMPH-OH, is a stimulant drug of the amphetamine family. It is the N-hydroxy derivative of amphetamine and has similar potency in terms of stimulant-like activity in animals. NOHA is a known metabolite of amphetamine and may be a prodrug of amphetamine. It has been encountered as a novel designer drug.

== See also ==
- Substituted amphetamine
- N-Hydroxymethamphetamine
- MDOH, MDMOH (FLEA)
- HOT-x (psychedelics)
- N-Hydroxy-DOM
- 2C-B-OH
- N-Hydroxy-AMT
