= N-Hydroxy-DOM =

Clinical data
- Other names: N-HO-DOM; 4-Methyl-2,5-dimethoxy-N-hydroxyamphetamine; 2,5-Dimethoxy-4-methyl-N-hydroxyamphetamine; DOM-OH
- Drug class: Possible serotonergic psychedelic or hallucinogen
- ATC code: None

Identifiers
- IUPAC name: N-[1-(2,5-dimethoxy-4-methylphenyl)propan-2-yl]hydroxylamine
- CAS Number: 43022-01-1
- PubChem CID: 597107
- ChemSpider: 519067
- UNII: 05R77CAF0B
- CompTox Dashboard (EPA): DTXSID80962859

Chemical and physical data
- Formula: C_{12}H_{19}NO_{3}
- Molar mass: 225.288 g·mol^{−1}
- 3D model (JSmol): Interactive image
- SMILES: CC1=CC(=C(C=C1OC)CC(C)NO)OC
- InChI: InChI=1S/C12H19NO3/c1-8-5-12(16-4)10(6-9(2)13-14)7-11(8)15-3/h5,7,9,13-14H,6H2,1-4H3; Key:JAIPYOTXVGSAEO-UHFFFAOYSA-N

N-Hydroxy-DOM, also known as 4-methyl-2,5-dimethoxy-N-hydroxyamphetamine or as DOM-OH, is a possible psychedelic drug of the phenethylamine, amphetamine, and DOx families related to DOM. It is the N-hydroxy derivative of DOM. The drug was not included nor mentioned by Alexander Shulgin in his 1991 book PiHKAL (Phenethylamines I Have Known and Loved) and its properties and effects in humans are unknown. N-Hydroxy-DOM was reported to produce DOM-like behavioral and physiological effects in rats, including pupil dilation and hypolocomotion among others, but was 6-fold less potent than DOM in this species. It also appears to be a metabolite of DOM formed by the liver in rabbits. Other N-hydroxy derivatives of phenethylamines such as the HOT-x series like HOT-2 (N-hydroxyl-2C-T-2) as well as MDOH (N-hydroxy-MDA) may act as prodrugs of their N-unsubstituted analogues. The chemical synthesis of N-hydroxy-DOM has been described. N-Hydroxy-DOM was first described in the scientific literature by Ronald Coutts and Jerry Malicky by 1973. It is a controlled substance in Canada under phenethylamine blanket-ban language.

== See also ==
- DOx (psychedelics)
- HOT-x (psychedelics)
- 2C-B-OH (N-hydroxy-2C-B)
- N-Hydroxyamphetamine
