= ROD-188 =

Chemical compound

Clinical data
- ATC code: none

Legal status
- Legal status: In general: uncontrolled

Identifiers
- IUPAC name: (5R)-5-{(1R)-2-[(4-methylphenyl)sulfonyl]-1,2,3,4-tetrahydroisoquinolin-1-yl}dihydrofuran-2(3H)-one
- CAS Number: 309267-40-1
- PubChem CID: 9842377
- ChemSpider: 8018092
- ChEMBL: ChEMBL136324
- CompTox Dashboard (EPA): DTXSID001027550

Chemical and physical data
- Formula: C_{20}H_{21}NO_{4}S
- Molar mass: 371.45 g·mol^{−1}
- 3D model (JSmol): Interactive image
- SMILES: Cc1ccc(cc1)S(=O)(=O)N2CCc4ccccc4[C@@H]2[C@@H]3CCC(=O)O3

ROD-188 is a sedative drug that was structurally derived from the GABA_{A} antagonist bicuculline by a team at Roche. Unlike bicuculline, ROD-188 acts as an agonist at GABA_{A} receptors, being a positive allosteric modulator acting at a novel binding site distinct from those of benzodiazepines, barbiturates or muscimol, with its strongest effect produced at the α6β2γ2 subtype of the GABA_{A} receptor. ROD-188 is one of a number of related compounds acting at this novel modulatory site, some of which also act at benzodiazepine receptors.

== See also ==
- Bicuculline
