= C10H14BrNO3 =

The molecular formula C_{10}H_{14}BrNO_{3} (molar mass : 276.13 g/mol) may refer to:

- BOH-2C-B
- 2C-B-OH
