= Glaucidium =

Glaucidium may refer to:

- Glaucidium (bird), a genus of pygmy owls in the family Strigidae
- Glaucidium (plant), a genus of plants in the family Ranunculaceae
