= Lobivine =

Names
- Preferred IUPAC name 2-(2H-1,3-Benzodioxol-5-yl)-N,N-dimethylethan-1-amine

Identifiers
CAS Number	65953-87-9
3D model (JSmol)	Interactive image
ChemSpider	26485734
PubChem CID	12816914
CompTox Dashboard (EPA)	DTXSID401045534
- InChI: InChI=1S/C11H15NO2/c1-12(2)6-5-9-3-4-10-11(7-9)14-8-13-10/h3-4,7H,5-6,8H2,1-2H3 Key: GWQGGJKNIBZRAG-UHFFFAOYSA-N
- SMILES: CN(C)CCc1ccc2c(c1)OCO2

Properties
Chemical formula	C_{11}H_{15}NO_{2}
Molar mass	193.246 g·mol^{−1}
- Except where otherwise noted, data are given for materials in their standard state (at 25 °C [77 °F], 100 kPa). Infobox references

Lobivine, also known as '3,4-methylenedioxy-N,N-dimethylphenethylamine (MDDMPEA), is a phenethylamine alkaloid found in Lophophora williamsii that is a constitutional isomer of MDMA.

== See also ==
- Homarylamine (3,4-methylenedioxy-N-methylphenethylamine; MDMPEA)
- 3,4-Methylenedioxyphenethylamine (MDMPEA)
- 3,4-Methylenedioxymethamphetamine (MDMA)
