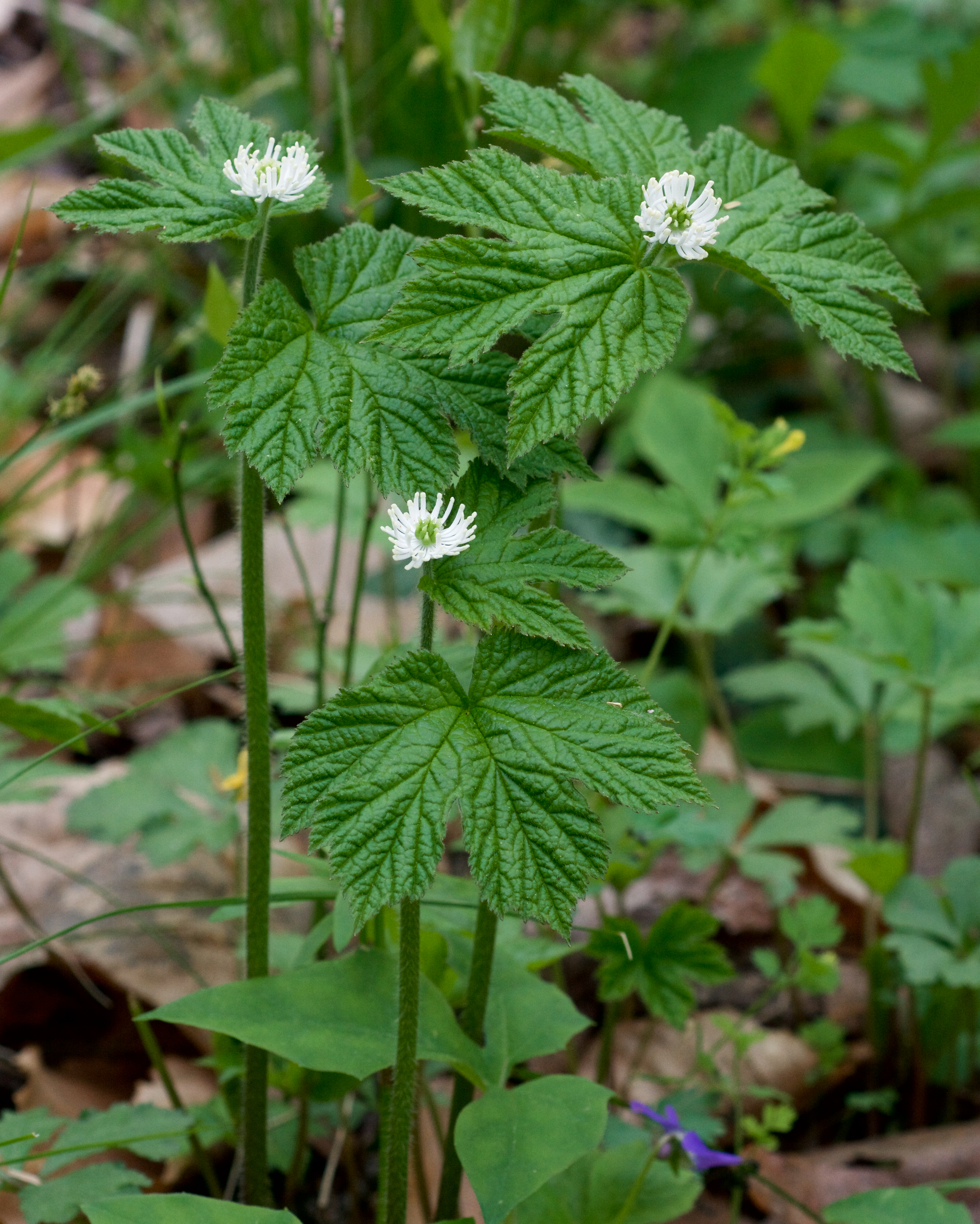
- Hydrastis canadensis

Conservation status
- Vulnerable (IUCN 3.1)
- CITES Appendix II

Scientific classification
- Kingdom: Plantae
- Clade: Tracheophytes
- Clade: Angiosperms
- Clade: Eudicots
- Order: Ranunculales
- Family: Ranunculaceae
- Subfamily: Hydrastidoideae; Rafinesque, 1815
- Genus: Hydrastis; L.
- Species: H. canadensis

Binomial name
- Hydrastis canadensis L.

= Goldenseal =

Species of flowering plant

Goldenseal (Hydrastis canadensis), also called orangeroot or yellow puccoon, is a perennial herb in the buttercup family Ranunculaceae, native to North America. It may be distinguished by its thick, yellow knotted rootstock. The stem is purplish and hairy above ground and yellow below ground where it connects to the yellow rhizome. Goldenseal reproduces both clonally through the rhizome and sexually, with clonal division more frequent than asexual reproduction. It takes between 4 and 5 years for a plant to reach sexual maturity, i.e. the point at which it produces flowers. Plants in the first stage, when the seed erupts and cotyledons emerge, can remain in this state one or more years. The second vegetative stage occurs during years two and three (and sometimes longer) and is characterized by the development of a single leaf and absence of a well developed stem. Finally, the third stage is reproductive, at which point flowering and fruiting occurs. This last stage takes between 4 and 5 years to develop.

A second species from Japan, previously listed as Hydrastis palmatum, is now usually classified in another genus, as Glaucidium palmatum.

== Description ==
Hydrastis canadensis is a herbaceous perennial growing from a horizontal, yellowish rhizome that is thick with knobby knots. The finely hairy, upright, unbranched, stems grow to 15–50 centimetres (6–19 1/2 inches) tall. Fertile plants have a single stem with two palmately lobed leaves. Flowering plants produce a single terminal flower with no petals and three sepals and 12 or more conspicuous white pistils; flowering occurs for a short time in spring. Fertilized flowers grow into red, raspberry-like fruits with one or two seeds.

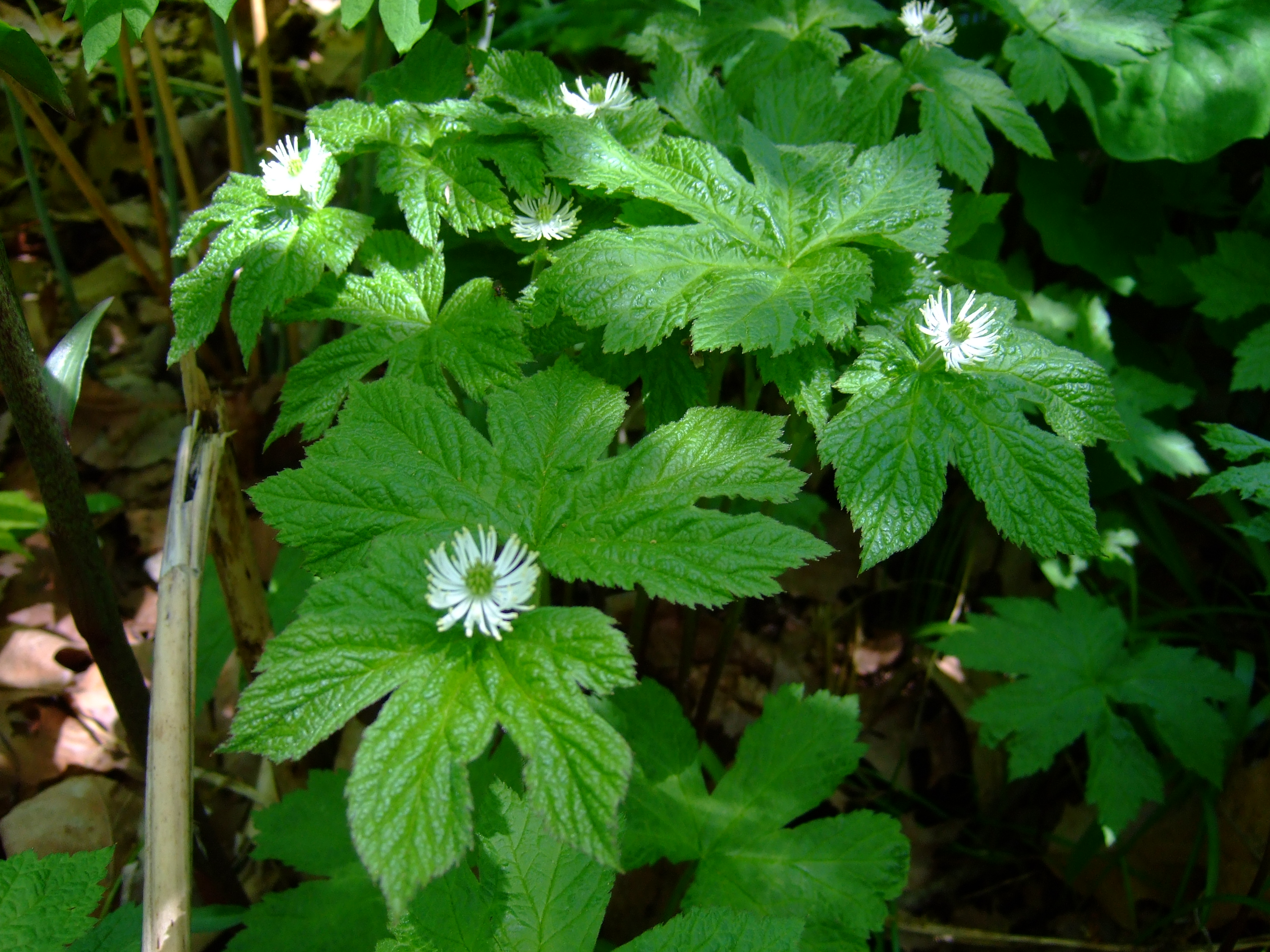
Goldenseal in flower

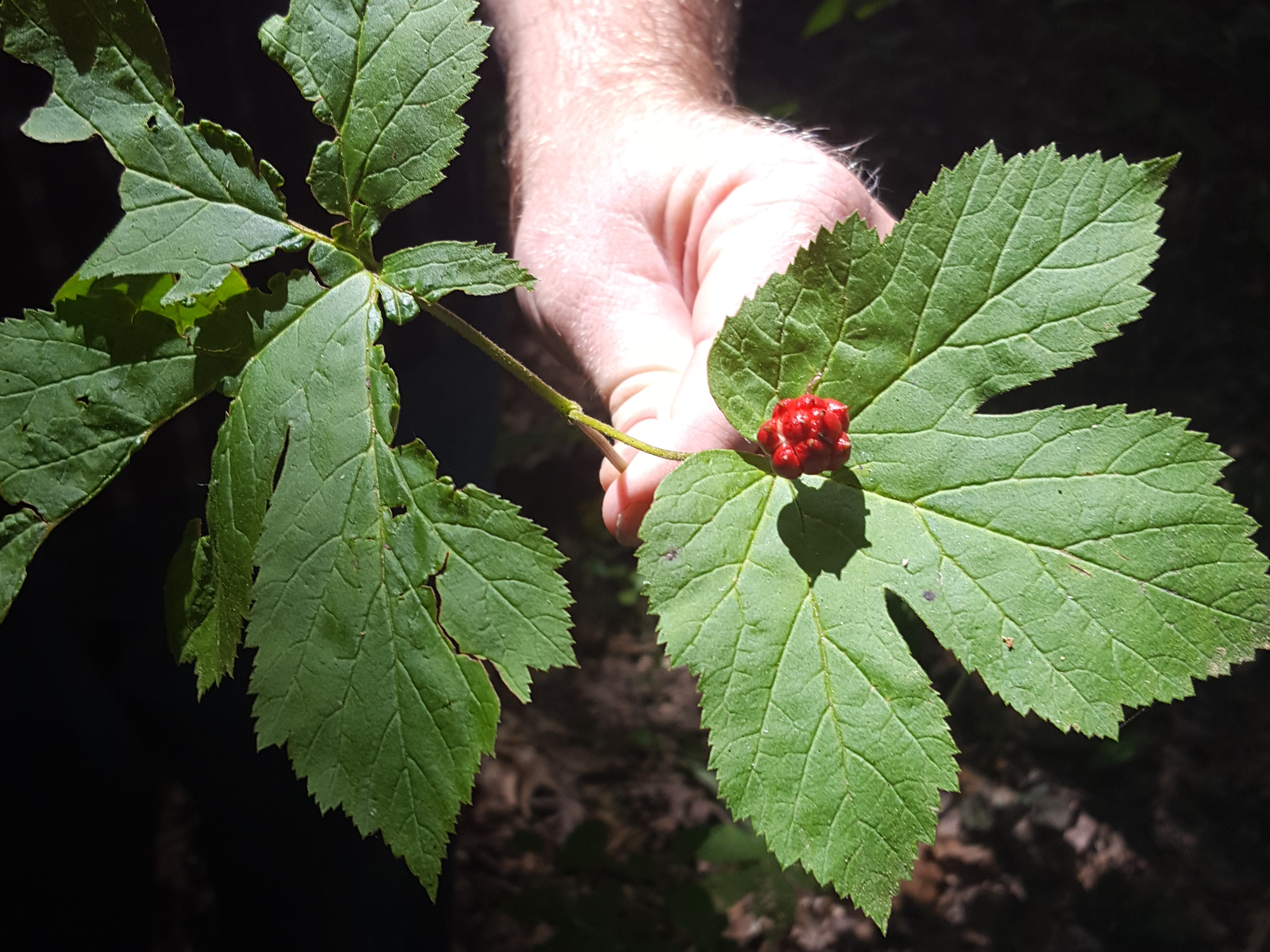
Goldenseal in fruit

=== Constituents and modern pharmacology ===
Goldenseal contains the isoquinoline alkaloids hydrastine, berberine, berberastine, hydrastinine, tetrahydroberberastine, canadine and canalidine. A related compound, 8-oxotetrahydrothalifendine, was identified in one study. The United States Pharmacopoeia requires goldenseal sold as a supplement to have hydrastine concentrations of at least 2% and berberine concentrations of at least 2.5%. The requirements in Europe are that hydrastine concentrations be at least 2.5% and that berberine concentrations at least 3%. The hydrastine concentrations of goldenseal plants range between 1.5% and 5%, while the berberine concentrations are usually between 0.5% and 4.5%. Goldenseal is harvested for its rhizomes because the concentrations of hydrastine and berberine in the shoots do not meet these requirements. Berberine and hydrastine act as quaternary bases and are poorly soluble in water but freely soluble in alcohol. The herb seems to have synergistic antibacterial activity over berberine in vitro, possibly as a result of efflux pump inhibitory activity.

== Distribution and habitat ==
Found in southeastern Canada and the eastern United States, the plant grows in mesic forests under deciduous trees. It is found in sheltered ravines or on talus slopes. It seems to be intolerant of disturbances in the tree canopy and grazing. It can be found growing in association with other uncommon plants such as Jeffersonia diphylla (twinleaf) and Dicentra canadensis (squirrel corn).

== Conservation ==
Goldenseal became popular in the mid-19th century. By 1905, the herb was much less plentiful because of overharvesting and habitat destruction. Roots of goldenseal are listed in Appendix II of the Convention on International Trade in Endangered Species of Wild Fauna and Flora (CITES), meaning a CITES permit to export is required. The U.S. Fish and Wildlife Service recommends that diggers and harvesters track sales and harvests and prove legality of all harvests.

Canada, as well as 17 of the 27 U.S. states where goldenseal grows natively, have declared it as threatened, vulnerable or uncommon. More than 60 million goldenseal plants are picked each year without being replaced. Although goldenseal's geographical range is wide, it is found in small quantities in these habitats. The core of the herb's range is in the Ohio River Valley, but its population there has decreased by almost half. The process of mountain top removal mining has recently put the wild goldenseal population at major risk from loss of habitat.

Many herbalists urge caution in choosing products containing goldenseal, as they may have been harvested in an unsustainable manner rather than having been organically cultivated.

There are several berberine-containing plants that can serve as useful alternatives, including Chinese coptis, yellowroot or Oregon grape root.

== Toxicity ==
According to the American Cancer Society, "Goldenseal can have toxic side effects, and high doses can cause death."

Side effects of goldenseal may include "digestive complaints, nervousness, depression, constipation, rapid heartbeat, diarrhea, stomach cramps and pain, mouth ulcers, nausea, seizures, vomiting, and central nervous system depression. High doses may cause breathing problems, paralysis, and even death. Long-term use may lead to vitamin B deficiency, hallucinations, and delirium." In addition, goldenseal may cause brain damage to newborn babies if given directly or if taken by breastfeeding or pregnant mothers, and may affect blood pressure unpredictably because it contains several compounds that have opposite effects on blood pressure.

Taking goldenseal over a long period of time can reduce absorption of B vitamins, and it is cautioned to avoid goldenseal during pregnancy and lactation, with gastrointestinal inflammation and with pro-inflammatory disorders. A 2011 study found rats fed goldenseal constantly for two years had a greater tendency to develop tumors.

Goldenseal has been found to have inhibited cytochrome P450 CYP2D6, CYP3A4 and CYP3A5 activity by approximately 40%, a statistically and clinically significant reduction. CYP2D6 is a known metabolizer of many commonly used pharmaceuticals, such as antidepressants (including all SSRIs except for fluvoxamine), neuroleptics, codeine, and Metformin. Combining goldenseal with such medications should be done with caution and under the supervision of a doctor as it can lead to serious, perhaps fatal, toxicity. Those with a genetic deficiency in these enzymes are at particular risk.

== Cultivation ==
As of 1998, only 2.4% of goldenseal plant material originated from a cultivated source rather than wild harvest, although that number was projected to rise by 15–30% over the next several years. In response to conservation concerns, research has expanded regarding the propagation success of wild plant material for commercial yield. Because goldenseal grows in patches of interconnected ramets reproducing asexually through clonal propagation, transplanting rhizome propagules into cultivated settings is possible. Seed propagation is also feasible and has advantages such as lower cost and greater genetic variability, but is considered difficult and unpredictable.

Goldenseal may be commercially cultivated through agroforestry in natural settings mirroring the plant's ecological environment, or on farms with artificial shade canopies. Another propagation method of goldenseal utilizes a controlled environment such as a greenhouse growing lab where the plant's environmental needs such as light, water and temperature are artificially simulated. Crop selection and biotechnology experimentation may be employed to increase yield and pharmacological potency. Controlled environments can greatly reduce the amount of time required to grow goldenseal to its desired harvestable state. While forest-cultivated plants double in mass every three to five years, plants can double in mass every 15 weeks in growth chambers and triple in growth when in a course soil medium. Subculturing can take place every 30 days to mass-propagate the plant.

Another option is cultivating goldenseal in new regions. An experiment conducted by Douglas et al. grew goldenseal over a six-year period in a warm, temperate environment in New Zealand. The yields were 74% higher in the sixth year of growth compared to the fourth year of growth, which is when goldenseal is normally harvested. The overall growth of the allochthonous goldenseal was comparable to that found in the United States, and the hydrastine and berberine concentrations were within the American and European standards. Cultivating goldenseal in a New Zealand environment that is similar to its home range is an option to maintain its population.

=== Research on harvest effects ===
Research completed by Albrecht and McCarthy shows that when goldenseal is harvested in the fall season, it has a faster population recovery than with midsummer harvests. However, a study by Douglas et al. showed that goldenseal has the highest concentrations of hydrastine and berberine in the early summer. Their research also showed that three to five years of growth will yield the highest concentration of alkaloids in the plant.

Two experiments done by Sinclair and Catling on the effects of soil turnover, fertilization and transplanting of goldenseal show that disturbances actually benefit the growth of goldenseal. The results from the first growing season of the experiment showed that soil turnover and fertilization combined show the greatest increase in plant biomass, while the results after two growing seasons showed that this group also yielded the highest proportion of flowering plants, fruit production and seed production. Both experiments also showed that soil disturbances benefit the growth of goldenseal.

== Uses ==
At the time of the European colonization of the Americas, goldenseal was in extensive use among certain Native American tribes of North America, both as a medicine and as a coloring material. In 1798, Benjamin Smith Barton referred to the Cherokee use of goldenseal as a cancer treatment; he called attention to its properties as a bitter tonic, and as a local wash for ophthalmia. It became a favorite of the Eclectics from the time of Constantine Raffinesque in the 1830s. Tribes also used goldenseal for digestive issues, as an eyewash, as a diuretic and as a bitter.

According to the American Cancer Society, "Available scientific evidence does not support claims that goldenseal is effective in treating cancer or other diseases." According to the National Center for Complementary and Integrative Health, "The scientific evidence does not support the use of goldenseal for any health-related purpose."

In the early 20th century, it was used as a yellow dye, astringent, and insect repellent.

== See also ==
- Coptisine
- List of ineffective cancer treatments

== Literature ==
- Blanchan, Neltje (2005). Wild Flowers Worth Knowing. Project Gutenberg Literary Archive Foundation. ISBN 0-665-98934-2.
- John Uri Lloyd (1908). Hydrastis canadensis. Lloyd Library, Cincinnati. PDF
- W. Scott Persons and Jeanine M. Davis (2005) Growing & Marketing Ginseng, Goldenseal & Other Woodland Medicinals Bright Mountain Books. ISBN 978-0-914875-42-0
- Richo Cech. (2002) Growing At-Risk Medicinal Herbs, Cultivation, Conservation and Ecology ISBN 978-0-9700312-1-1
