= 2C-MMDA-3a =

Clinical data
- Other names: 2C-3a; 2-Methoxy-3,4-methylenedioxyphenethylamine; 2-Methoxy-MDPEA; 2-MeO-MDPEA; 2-Methoxy-3,4-MDPEA; 2-MeO-3,4-MDPEA; MMDPEA-3a
- Routes of administration: Oral
- Drug class: Psychoactive drug
- ATC code: None

Pharmacokinetic data
- Duration of action: Unknown

Identifiers
- IUPAC name: 2-(4-methoxy-1,3-benzodioxol-5-yl)ethanamine
- CAS Number: 2220-19-1
- PubChem CID: 11127161
- ChemSpider: 9302281
- ChEMBL: ChEMBL1196834

Chemical and physical data
- Formula: C_{10}H_{13}NO_{3}
- Molar mass: 195.218 g·mol^{−1}
- 3D model (JSmol): Interactive image
- SMILES: COC1=C(C=CC2=C1OCO2)CCN
- InChI: InChI=1S/C10H13NO3/c1-12-9-7(4-5-11)2-3-8-10(9)14-6-13-8/h2-3H,4-6,11H2,1H3; Key:AXEJSBWWIHAWJM-UHFFFAOYSA-N

2C-MMDA-3a, also known as 2C-3a, MMDPEA-3a, or 2-methoxy-3,4-methylenedioxyphenethylamine (2-methoxy-MDPEA), is a psychoactive drug of the phenethylamine and MDxx families related to 3,4-methylenedioxyphenethylamine (MDPEA). It is the phenethylamine (2C) analogue of MMDA-3a and the 2-methoxy derivative of MDPEA. According to Alexander Shulgin in his 1991 book PiHKAL (Phenethylamines I Have Known and Loved), 2C-MMDA-3a has a dose range of 40 to 120 mg orally with marginal effects. At 40 mg, there was perhaps the hint of a psychic energizer (antidepressant); at 65 mg, there was pleasant mood elevation; and at 80 and 120 mg, there was brief parasthesia. Shulgin has noted the modest change in effects with the drug over a three-fold dose range and has wondered whether it might be useful as an antidepressant or might be a serotonin reuptake inhibitor. The chemical synthesis of 2C-MMDA-3a has been described. It was first described in the scientific literature by Shulgin and colleagues by 1969.

== See also ==
- Substituted methylenedioxyphenethylamine
- Substituted methoxyphenethylamine
- Methoxymethylenedioxyphenethylamine
- Lophophine (2C-MMDA-1 or MMDPEA-1)
- 2C-MMDA-2
- 2C2-NBOMe (2C-MMDA-2-NBOMe)
