= Strickland Gillilan =

American poet

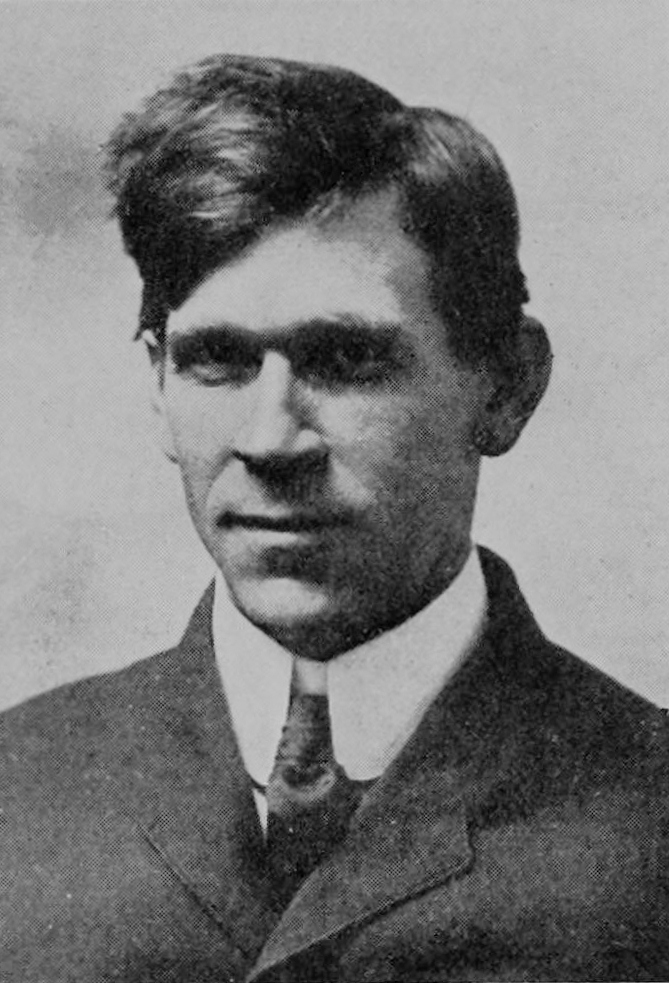
Strickland Gillilan

Strickland W. Gillilan (1869–1954) was an American journalist, author, poet, humorist and speaker. He is most famous for the poem The Reading Mother, which remains a popular poem on Mother's Day. He is also recognized as the author of Lines on the Antiquity of Microbes, said to be the shortest poem ever written. Much of his work is public domain and is often reproduced in greeting cards.

Gillilan was an Ohio-born descendant of a Nathan Gilliland line which can be traced from Augusta County, Virginia back to Ireland and Scotland.

Gillilan's writings, which ranged from the satirical to the sublime, made him one of the more popular authors and speakers of his time. After three years at Ohio University in Athens, Strickland started his journalism career at the Jackson, Ohio Herald, but this was only the beginning of a lifelong journey as an editor and writer. His career followed a path from rural Ohio across the country to Los Angeles and finally back to Warrenton, Virginia, from where he contributed to the Washington Post. It was not as an editor or a journalist for which Strickland will be remembered. He had been a lyceum lecturer and after dinner speaker since 1899. Following three years on staff at the Baltimore American (1902-1905) he became a free-lance writer and by 1908 his poems were being published in the Saturday Evening Post, a magazine which would feature many of Strickland's poems in the years following.

In addition to his many poems, Strickland Gillilan also penned short stories, wrote several songs (the most famous of which, the wickedly sharp The Poison Squad, is reputed to have led to the passage of the Food and Drug Act of 1906) as well as a number of novels that are still available on today's market.

Strickland Gillilan and his wife were invited to White House receptions on two occasions, January 4, 1934 and January 9, 1936 under President Franklin D. Roosevelt.
