= N-Hydroxy-AMT =

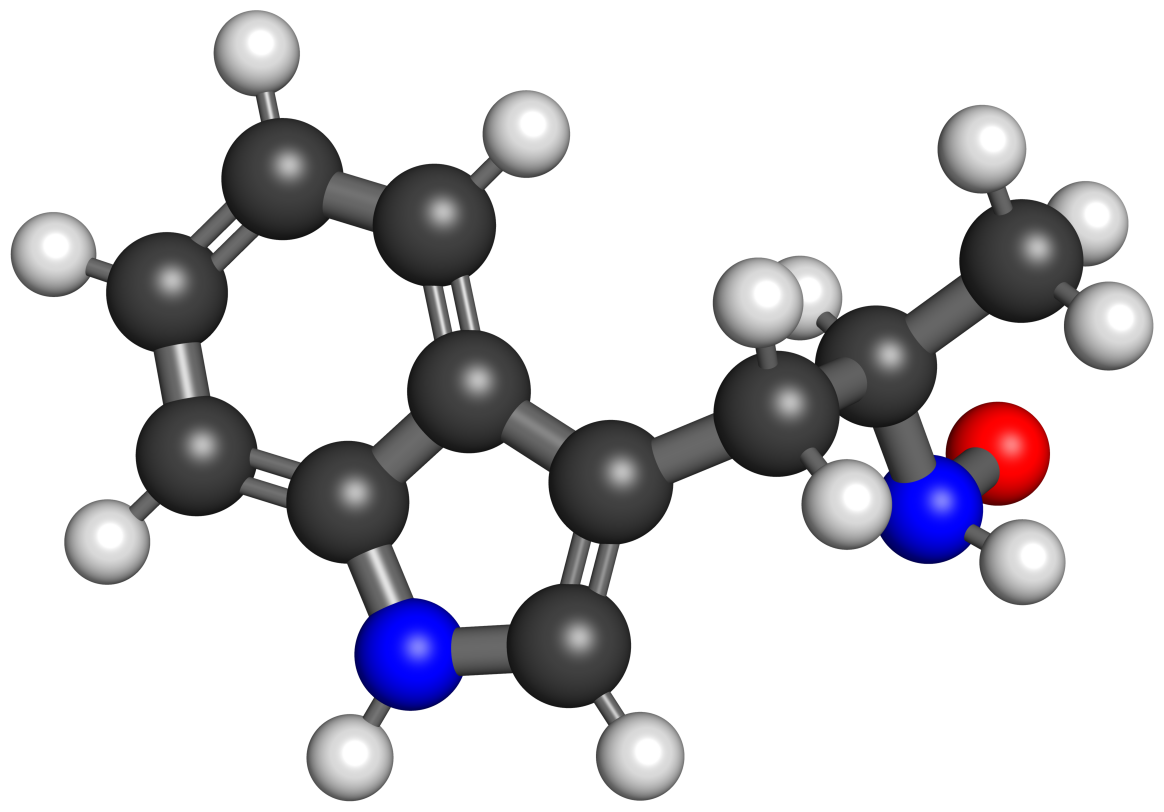

Clinical data
- Other names: N-HO-AMT; N-Hydroxy-α-methyltryptamine
- Drug class: Possible psychedelic drug or hallucinogen; Stimulant
- ATC code: None

Identifiers
- IUPAC name: N-[1-(1H-indol-3-yl)propan-2-yl]hydroxylamine
- CAS Number: 63-33-2
- PubChem CID: 56728
- ChemSpider: 51154

Chemical and physical data
- Formula: C_{11}H_{14}N_{2}O
- Molar mass: 190.246 g·mol^{−1}
- 3D model (JSmol): Interactive image
- SMILES: CC(CC1=CNC2=CC=CC=C21)NO
- InChI: InChI=1S/C11H14N2O/c1-8(13-14)6-9-7-12-11-5-3-2-4-10(9)11/h2-5,7-8,12-14H,6H2,1H3; Key:QDEFFOYILHFBSE-UHFFFAOYSA-N

N-Hydroxy-AMT, or N-HO-AMT, also known as N-hydroxy-α-methyltryptamine, is a possible psychedelic drug of the tryptamine and α-alkyltryptamine families related to α-methyltryptamine (AMT). It is the N-hydroxy derivative of AMT. The drug was not mentioned in Alexander Shulgin's 1997 book TiHKAL (Tryptamines I Have Known and Loved) and its properties and effects in humans are unknown. In preclinical research, N-hydroxy-AMT produces stimulant-like effects in mice such as hyperlocomotion and antagonism of hexobarbital-induced sleeping time, pressor effects in cats, and a psychedelic-like rage reaction in cats. Unlike AMT, it is not a monoamine oxidase inhibitor (MAOI) in vitro. N-Hydroxy derivatives of phenethylamines such as the HOT-x series like HOT-2 as well as MDOH may act as prodrugs of their N-unsubstituted forms. The chemical synthesis and analytical detection of N-hydroxy-AMT have been described. N-Hydroxy-AMT was first described in the scientific literature by F. Benington and colleagues in 1965. It is not a controlled substance in Canada as of 2025.

== See also ==
- Substituted α-alkyltryptamine
