= HOT-17 =

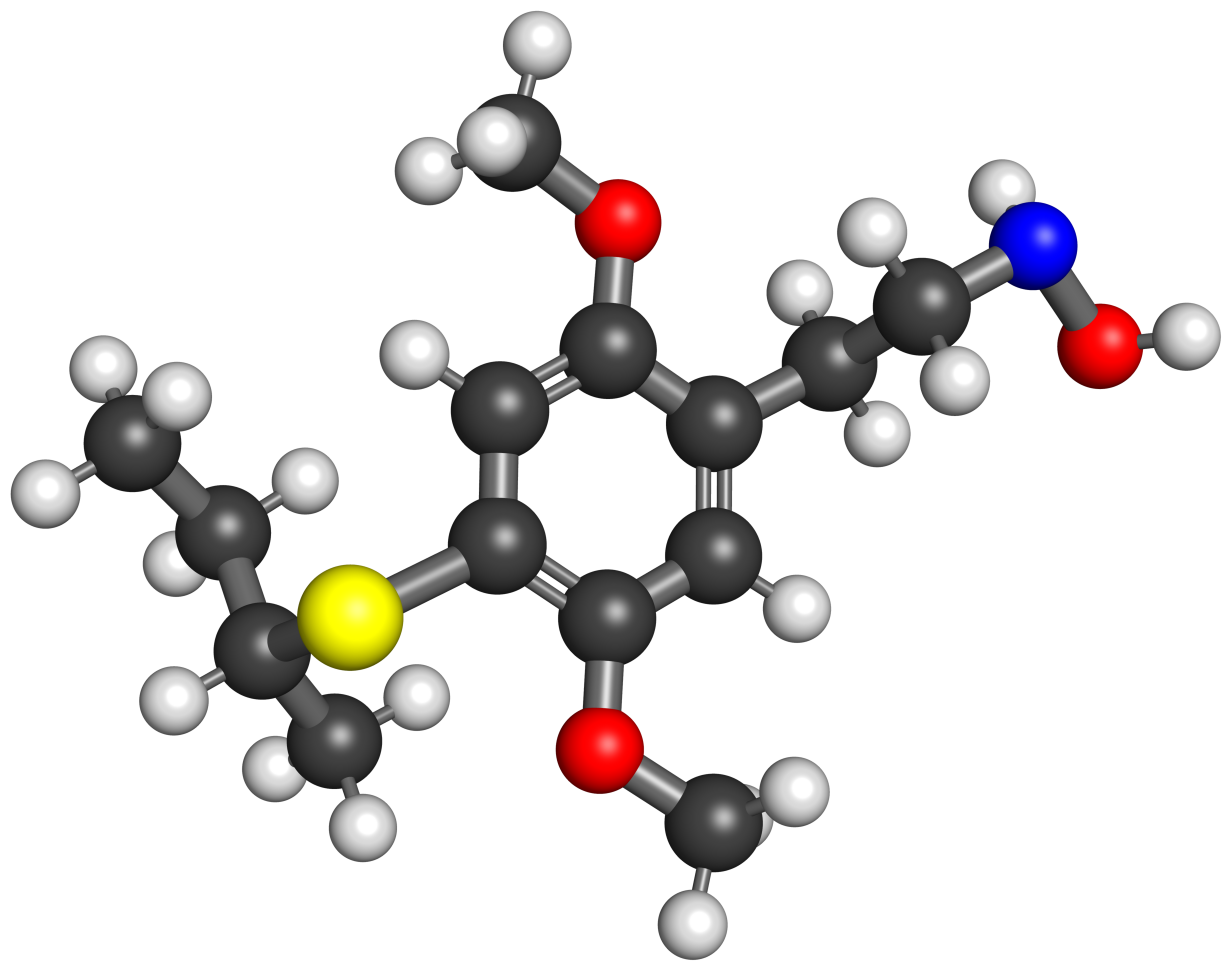

Clinical data
- Other names: 4-sec-Butylthio-2,5-dimethoxy-N-hydroxyphenethylamine; 2,5-Dimethoxy-4-sec-butylthio-N-hydroxyphenethylamine; N-Hydroxy-2C-T-17; N-OH-2C-T-17
- Routes of administration: Oral
- Drug class: Serotonergic psychedelic; Hallucinogen
- ATC code: None

Pharmacokinetic data
- Metabolites: Possibly 2C-T-17
- Onset of action: 0.5–1.5 hours Peak: 3 hours
- Duration of action: 12–18 hours

Identifiers
- IUPAC name: 2-{4-[(butan-2-yl)sulfanyl]-2,5-dimethoxyphenyl}-N-hydroxyethan-1-amine
- CAS Number: 207740-40-7
- PubChem CID: 44350007
- ChemSpider: 21106319
- UNII: A9AD8C69LQ
- ChEMBL: ChEMBL127509
- CompTox Dashboard (EPA): DTXSID70658370

Chemical and physical data
- Formula: C_{14}H_{23}NO_{3}S
- Molar mass: 285.40 g·mol^{−1}
- 3D model (JSmol): Interactive image
- SMILES: CCC(C)SC1=C(C=C(C(=C1)OC)CCNO)OC
- InChI: InChI=1S/C14H23NO3S/c1-5-10(2)19-14-9-12(17-3)11(6-7-15-16)8-13(14)18-4/h8-10,15-16H,5-7H2,1-4H3; Key:BUKIXGXYEUJJHQ-UHFFFAOYSA-N

HOT-17, also known as 4-sec-butylthio-2,5-dimethoxy-N-hydroxyphenethylamine or as N-hydroxy-2C-T-17, is a psychedelic drug of the phenethylamine, 2C, and HOT-x families. It is the N-hydroxy derivative of 2C-T-17. The drug is taken orally.

== Use and effects ==
In his book PiHKAL (Phenethylamines I Have Known and Loved), Alexander Shulgin lists HOT-17's dose range as 70 to 120 mg orally and its duration as 12 to 18 hours. The drug's onset is 30 minutes to 1.5 hours and peak effects occur after 3 hours. HOT-17's properties are very similar to those of 2C-T-17, which has a dose of 60 to 100 mg orally, a duration of 10 to 15 hours, and an onset of 1 hour with a time to peak of 3 hours. HOT-17 may act as a prodrug of 2C-T-17.

The effects of HOT-17 have been reported to include "something going on upstairs", no sensory distortion, mild time distortion, feeling light and slightly floaty, walking feeling pleasant due to the lightness, and no body load, among others. It was described as producing "plus-two" and "plus-three" experiences on the Shulgin Rating Scale. The compound is said to have an "unbelievably grim taste—not bitter, but simply evil".

== Chemistry ==
=== Synthesis ===
The chemical synthesis of HOT-17 has been described.

=== Analogues ===
Analogues of HOT-17 include 2C-T-17, HOT-2 (N-hydroxy-2C-T-2), and HOT-7 (N-hydroxy-2C-T-7), among others.

== History ==
HOT-17 was first described in the literature by Alexander Shulgin in his 1991 book PiHKAL (Phenethylamines I Have Known and Loved).

== Society and culture ==
=== Legal status ===
==== Canada ====
HOT-17 is a controlled substance in Canada under phenethylamine blanket-ban language.

== See also ==
- HOT-x (psychedelics)
