= 3,4-Methylenedioxy-N-hydroxy-N-methylamphetamine =

Entactogen

FLEA

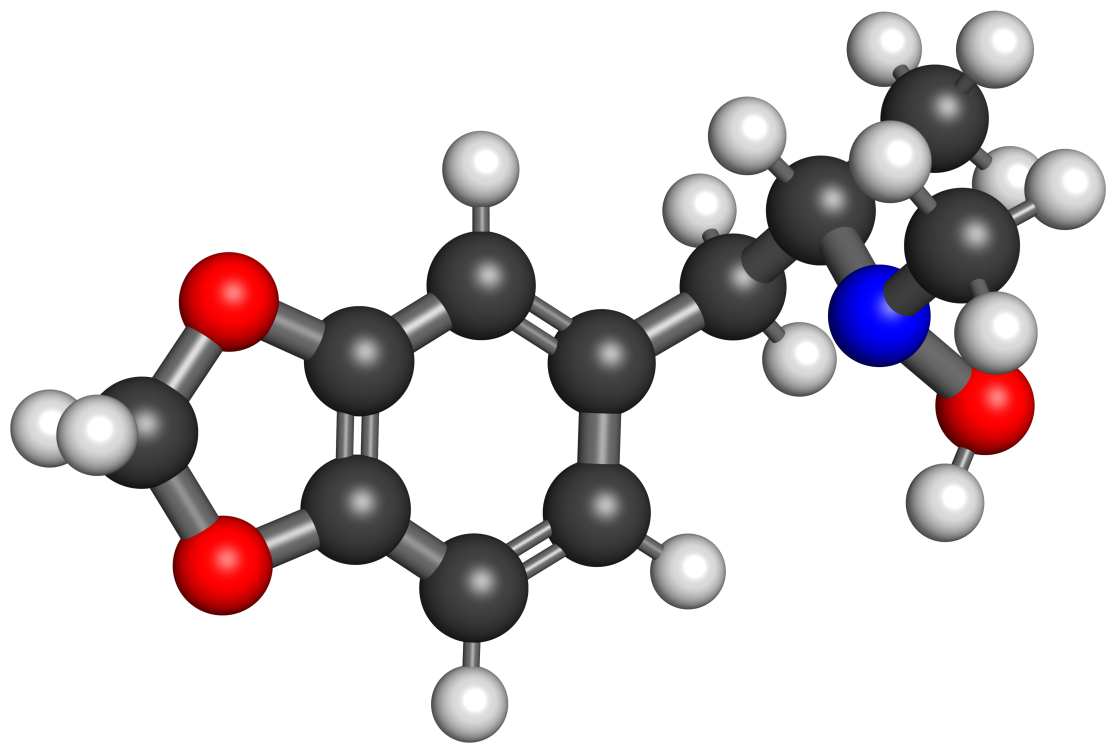

Clinical data
- Other names: 3,4-Methylenedioxy-N-hydroxy-N-methylamphetamine; 3,4-Methylenedioxy-N-methyl-N-hydroxyamphetamine; MDMOH; MDHMA; N-Hydroxy-MDMA; FLEA
- Routes of administration: Oral
- Drug class: Entactogen
- ATC code: None

Legal status
- Legal status: DE: Anlage I (Authorized scientific use only); UK: Class A

Pharmacokinetic data
- Duration of action: 4–8 hours

Identifiers
- IUPAC name: 1-(1,3-benzodioxol-5-yl)-N-hydroxy-N-methylpropan-2-amine
- CAS Number: 214414-88-7
- PubChem CID: 44350092
- ChemSpider: 21106310
- UNII: E2816HU3KT
- KEGG: C22806
- CompTox Dashboard (EPA): DTXSID90658377

Chemical and physical data
- Formula: C_{11}H_{15}NO_{3}
- Molar mass: 209.245 g·mol^{−1}
- 3D model (JSmol): Interactive image
- SMILES: C1=C2C(=CC=C1CC(C)N(C)O)OCO2
- InChI: InChI=1S/C11H15NO3/c1-8(12(2)13)5-9-3-4-10-11(6-9)15-7-14-10/h3-4,6,8,13H,5,7H2,1-2H3; Key:ORADFQZOLNHWRQ-UHFFFAOYSA-N

3,4-Methylenedioxy-N-hydroxy-N-methylamphetamine, also known as MDMOH, MDHMA, or FLEA, is an entactogen, psychedelic, and stimulant of the phenethylamine, amphetamine, and MDxx families. It is the N-hydroxy homologue of MDMA ("Ecstasy"), and the N-methyl homologue of MDOH.

== Use and effects ==
In his book PiHKAL (Phenethylamines I Have Known and Loved), Alexander Shulgin lists FLEA's dose as 100 to 160 mg orally and its duration as 4 to 8 hours. He describes FLEA as producing entactogenic and open MDMA-like effects, easing communication, and increasing appreciation of the senses. He has noted that the properties and effects of the closely related drug MDOH are very similar or near-identical to those of MDA, and that MDOH might be converted into MDA in the body.

== Chemistry ==
=== Synthesis ===
The chemical synthesis of FLEA has been described.

=== Analogues ===
Analogues of FLEA include MDMA and MDOH (N-hydroxy-MDA), among others.

== Society and culture ==
=== Names ===
Alexander Shulgin explained the reasoning for naming the compound "FLEA" in his book PiHKAL (Phenethylamines I Have Known and Loved):

Of course, I was asked, why call it FLEA? The origin was in a classic bit of poetry. A commonly used code name for MDMA was ADAM, and I had tried making several modest modifications of the MDMA structure in the search for another compound that would maintain its particular music without the annoying tooth-grinding and occasional nystagmus, or eye-wiggle, that some users have mentioned. One of these was the 6-methyl homologue which was, with some perverse logic, called MADAM. And, following this pattern, the 6-fluoroanalogue was to be FLADAM. So, with the N-hydroxy analogue, what about HADAM? Which brought to mind the classic description of Adam's earliest complaint, an infestation of fleas. The poem was short and direct. "Adam had 'em." So, in place of HAD 'EM, the term FLEA jumped into being.

=== Legal status ===
==== Canada ====
FLEA is a controlled substance in Canada under phenethylamine blanket-ban language.

==== United Kingdom ====
This substance is a Class A drug in the Drugs controlled by the UK Misuse of Drugs Act.

==== United States ====
FLEA is not an explicitly controlled substance in the United States. However, it could be considered a controlled substance under the Federal Analogue Act if intended for human consumption.

== See also ==
- Substituted methylenedioxyphenethylamine
- HOT-x (psychedelics)
- N-Hydroxyamphetamine
- N-Hydroxymethamphetamine
