= N-Hydroxymethamphetamine =

Clinical data
- Other names: N-HO-MA; N-hydroxy-NMA; N-Hydroxy-N-methylamphetamine
- ATC code: None

Identifiers
- IUPAC name: N-methyl-N-(1-phenylpropan-2-yl)hydroxylamine
- CAS Number: 52271-36-0
- PubChem CID: 6452608
- ChemSpider: 4955034
- CompTox Dashboard (EPA): DTXSID90966646

Chemical and physical data
- Formula: C_{10}H_{15}NO
- Molar mass: 165.236 g·mol^{−1}
- 3D model (JSmol): Interactive image
- SMILES: CC(CC1=CC=CC=C1)N(C)O
- InChI: InChI=1S/C10H15NO/c1-9(11(2)12)8-10-6-4-3-5-7-10/h3-7,9,12H,8H2,1-2H3; Key:PCDVFYKROPOLBF-UHFFFAOYSA-N

N-Hydroxymethamphetamine (N-HO-MA or N-hydroxy-NMA) is a known metabolite of the stimulant drug methamphetamine.

== See also ==
- Substituted amphetamine
- N-Hydroxyamphetamine
- MDMOH (FLEA)
