= Methoxymethylenedioxyphenethylamine =

Methoxymethylenedioxyphenethylamine (MMDPEA) may refer to:

- Lophophine (3-methoxy-4,5-methylenedioxyphenethylamine; MMDPEA, MMDPEA-1, or 2C-MMDA-1; 5-methoxy-MDPEA)
- 2-Methoxy-4,5-methylenedioxyphenethylamine (MMDPEA-2 or 2C-MMDA-2; 6-methoxy-MDPEA)
- 2-Methoxy-3,4-methylenedioxyphenethylamine (MMDPEA-3a or 2C-MMDA-3a; 2-methoxy-MDPEA)
- 4-Methoxy-2,3-methylenedioxyphenethylamine (MMDPEA-3b or 2C-MMDA-3b; 4-methoxy-ORTHO-MDPEA)
- 5-Methoxy-2,3-methylenedioxyphenethylamine (MMDPEA-4 or 2C-MMDA-4; 5-methoxy-ORTHO-MDPEA)
- 6-Methoxy-2,3-methylenedioxyphenethylamine (MMDPEA-5 or 2C-MMDA-5; 6-methoxy-ORTHO-MDPEA)

== See also ==
- Methoxymethylenedioxyamphetamine
- Dimethoxymethylenedioxyamphetamine
