= HOT-x =

Group of psychedelic drugs

HOT-2 (N-hydroxy-2C-T-2), a psychedelic drug of the HOT-x group.

HOT-x, also known as 4-alkylthio-2,5-dimethoxy-N-hydroxyphenethylamines or hydroxylated 2C-T derivatives, are a group of psychedelic drugs of the phenethylamine and 2C families. They have a hydroxy group (HO) at the amine as well as methoxy groups at the 2 and 5 positions and an alkylthio (T) group at the 4 position of the phenyl ring. The HOT-x drugs are the N-hydroxyl analogues of the corresponding 2C-T-x drugs.

The HOT-x drugs were synthesized and tested by Alexander Shulgin and were reported by him in his 1991 book PiHKAL (Phenethylamines I Have Known and Loved).

== Use and effects ==
Oral doses and durations of HOT-x drugs
Compound	Chemical name	Dose	Duration
HOT-2 (N-hydroxy-2C-T-2)	N-Hydroxy-4-ethylthio-2,5-dimethoxyphenethylamine	10–18 mg	6–10 hours
HOT-7 (N-hydroxy-2C-T-7)	N-Hydroxy-4-propylthio-2,5-dimethoxyphenethylamine	15–25 mg	6–8 hours
HOT-17 (N-hydroxy-2C-T-17)	N-Hydroxy-4-sec-butylthio-2,5-dimethoxyphenethylamine	70–120 mg	12–18 hours
Refs:

All three of the HOT-x drugs produce psychedelic effects according to Shulgin. The HOT-x drugs are said to be very similar to their 2C-T counterparts in terms of properties and effects and may act as prodrugs to these compounds.

== Society and culture ==
=== Legal status ===
==== Canada ====
The HOT-x drugs are controlled substances in Canada under phenethylamine blanket-ban language.

== See also ==
- 2C (psychedelics)
- Substituted methoxyphenethylamine
- N-Hydroxyamphetamine
- MDOH (MDH; N-OH-MDA)
- MDHMA (FLEA; N-OH-MDMA)
- 2C-B-OH (N-hydroxy-2C-B)
- N-Hydroxy-DOM
- N-Hydroxy-AMT
