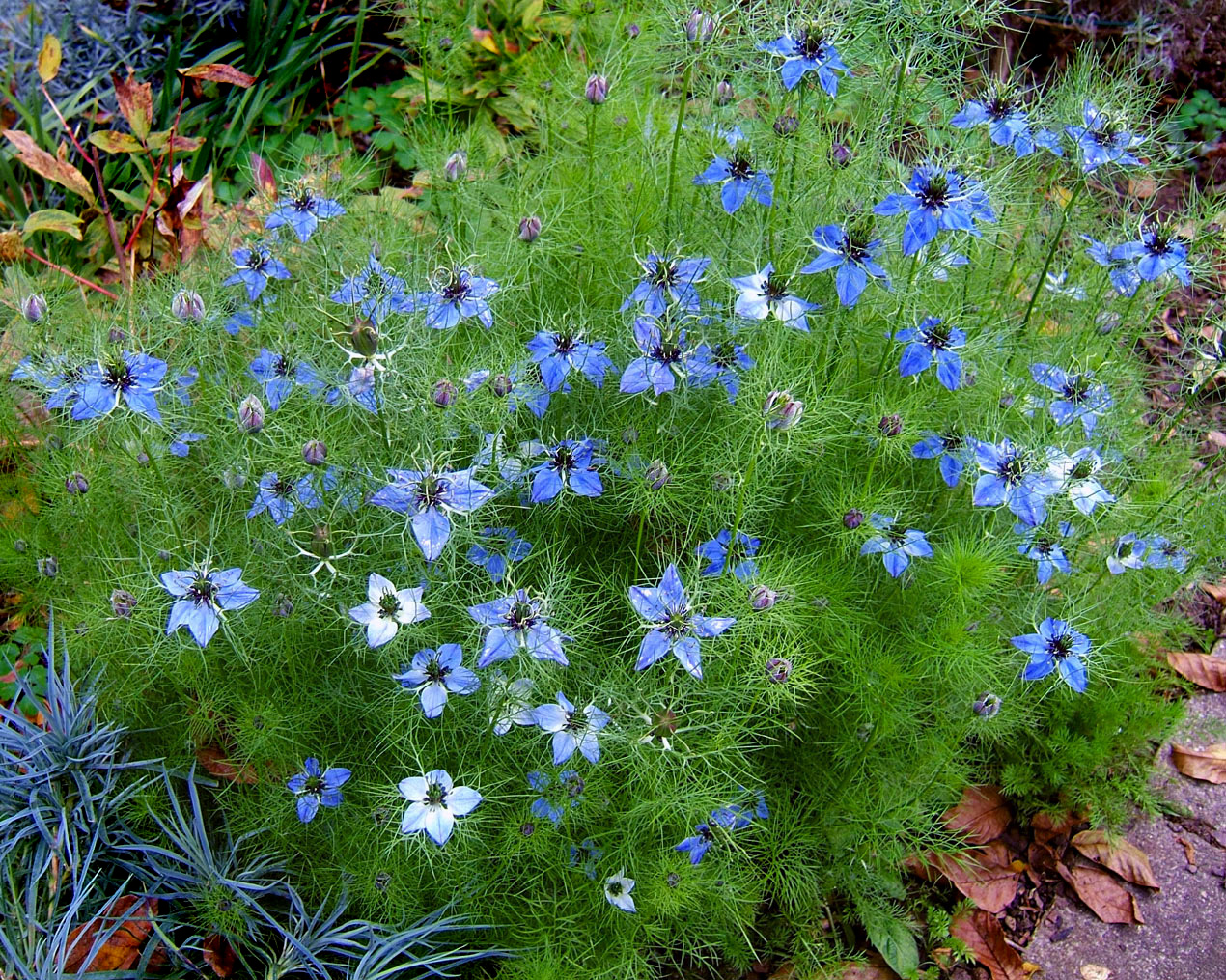

Scientific classification
- Kingdom: Plantae
- Clade: Embryophytes
- Clade: Tracheophytes
- Clade: Spermatophytes
- Clade: Angiosperms
- Clade: Eudicots
- Order: Ranunculales
- Family: Ranunculaceae
- Genus: Nigella
- Species: N. damascena

Binomial name
- Nigella damascena L.

= Nigella damascena =

Species of flowering plant in the buttercup family

Nigella damascena, love-in-a-mist, or devil in the bush, is an annual garden flowering plant, belonging to the buttercup family Ranunculaceae. It is native to southern Europe (but adventive in more northern countries of Europe), north Africa and southwest Asia, where it is found on neglected, damp patches of land.

The specific epithet damascena relates to Damascus in Syria. The plant's common name "love-in-a-mist" comes from the flower being nestled in a ring of multifid, lacy bracts.

== Description ==
It grows to 20–50 cm (8–20 in) tall, with pinnately divided, thread-like, alternate leaves. The flowers, blooming in early summer, are most commonly different shades of blue, but can be white, pink, or pale purple, with 5 to 25 sepals. The actual petals are located at the base of the stamens and are minute and clawed. The sepals are the only colored part of the perianth. The four to five carpels of the compound pistil have each an erect style.

The fruit is a large and inflated capsule, growing from a compound ovary, and is composed of several united follicles, each containing numerous seeds. This is rather exceptional for a member of the buttercup family. The capsule becomes brown in late summer. The plant self-seeds, growing on the same spot year after year.

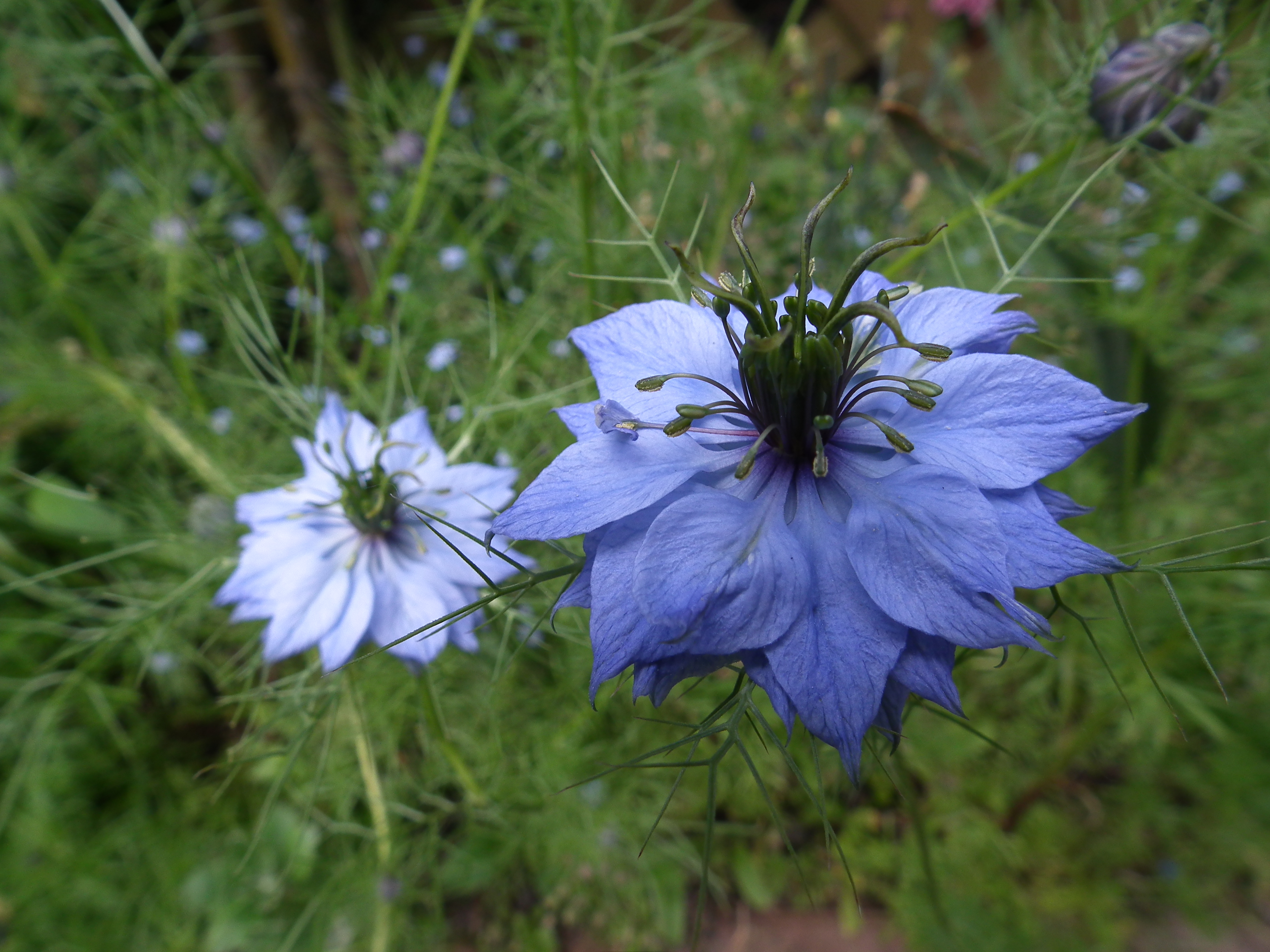
Double form

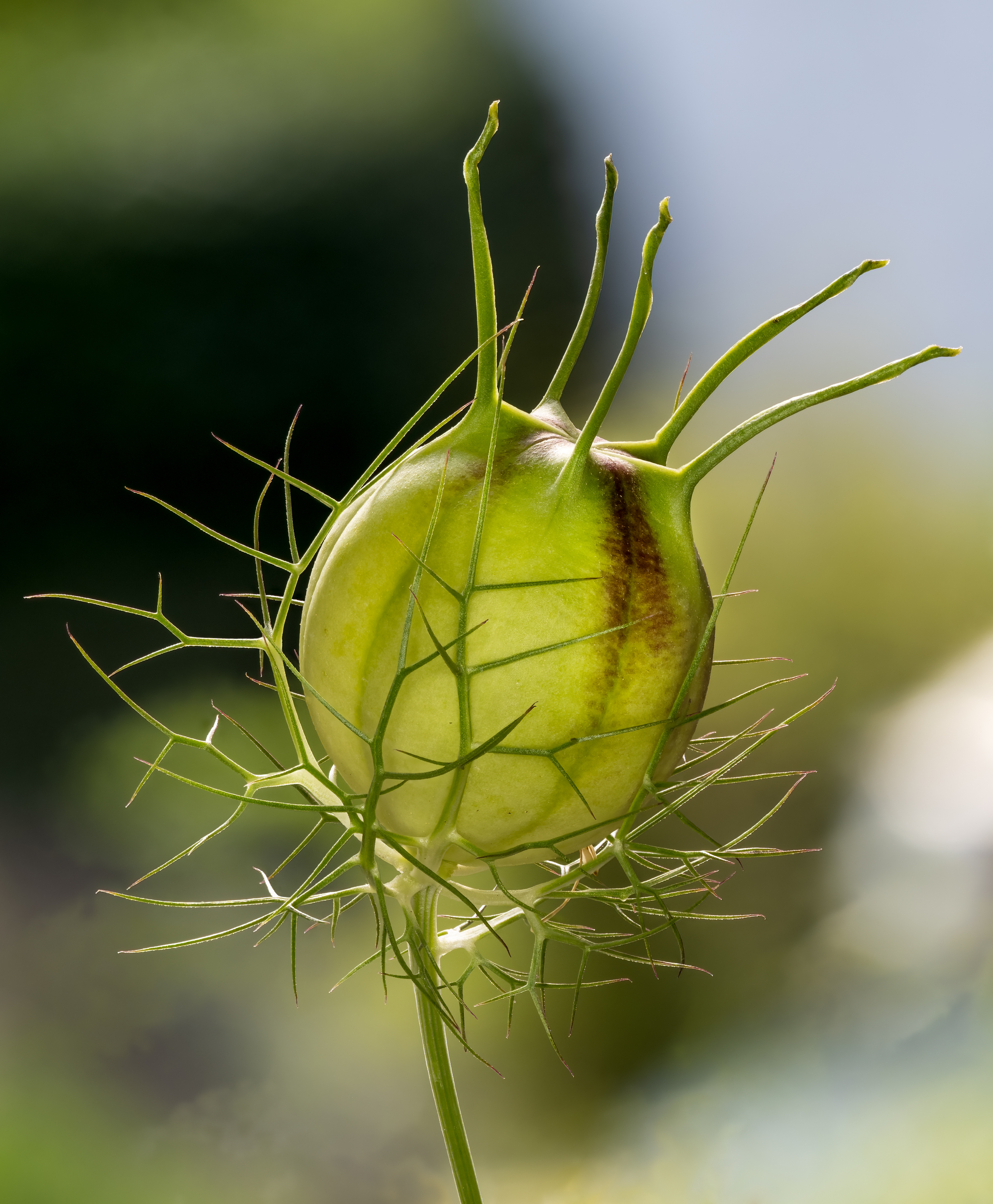
Seed capsule

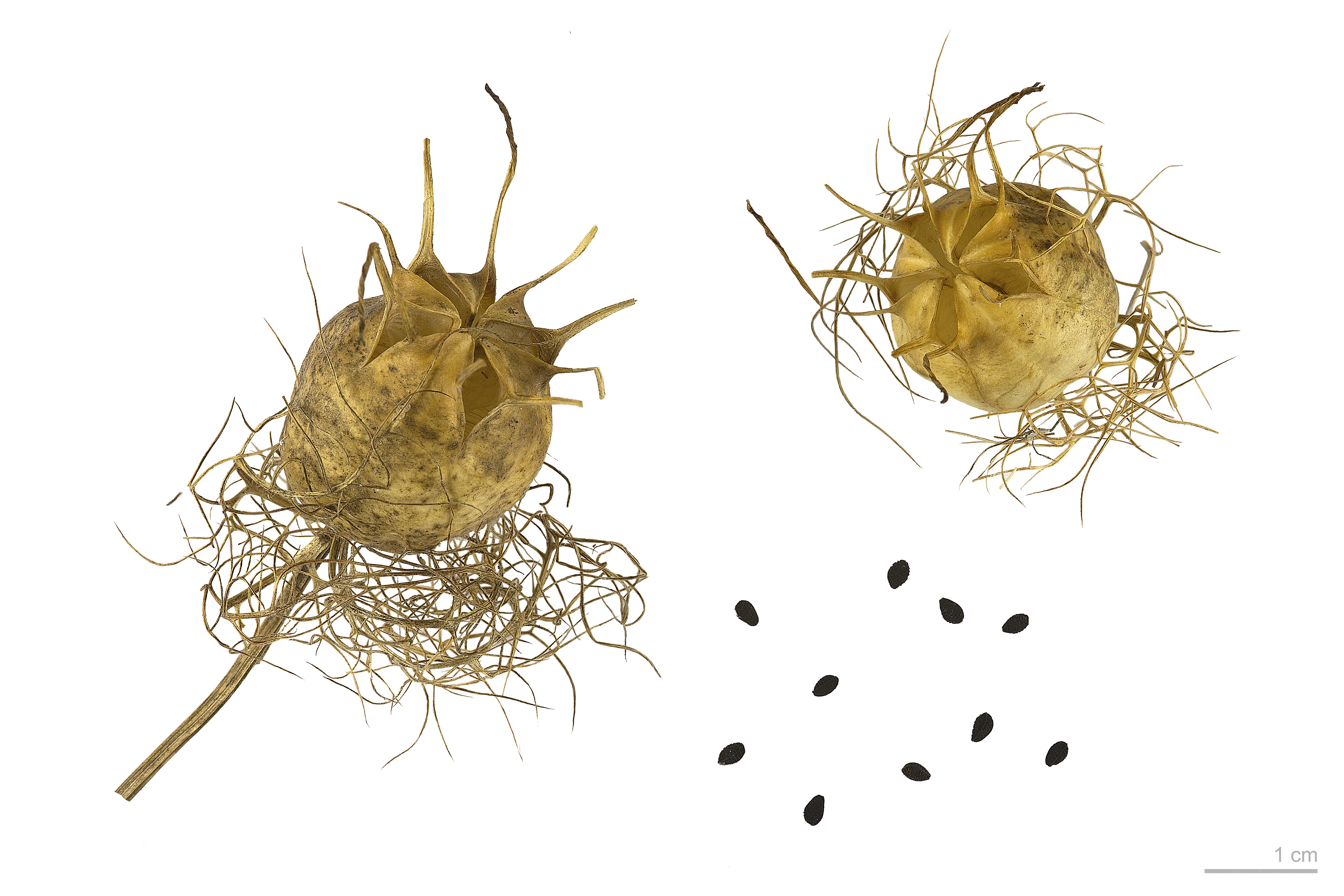
Dried seed-heads with seeds

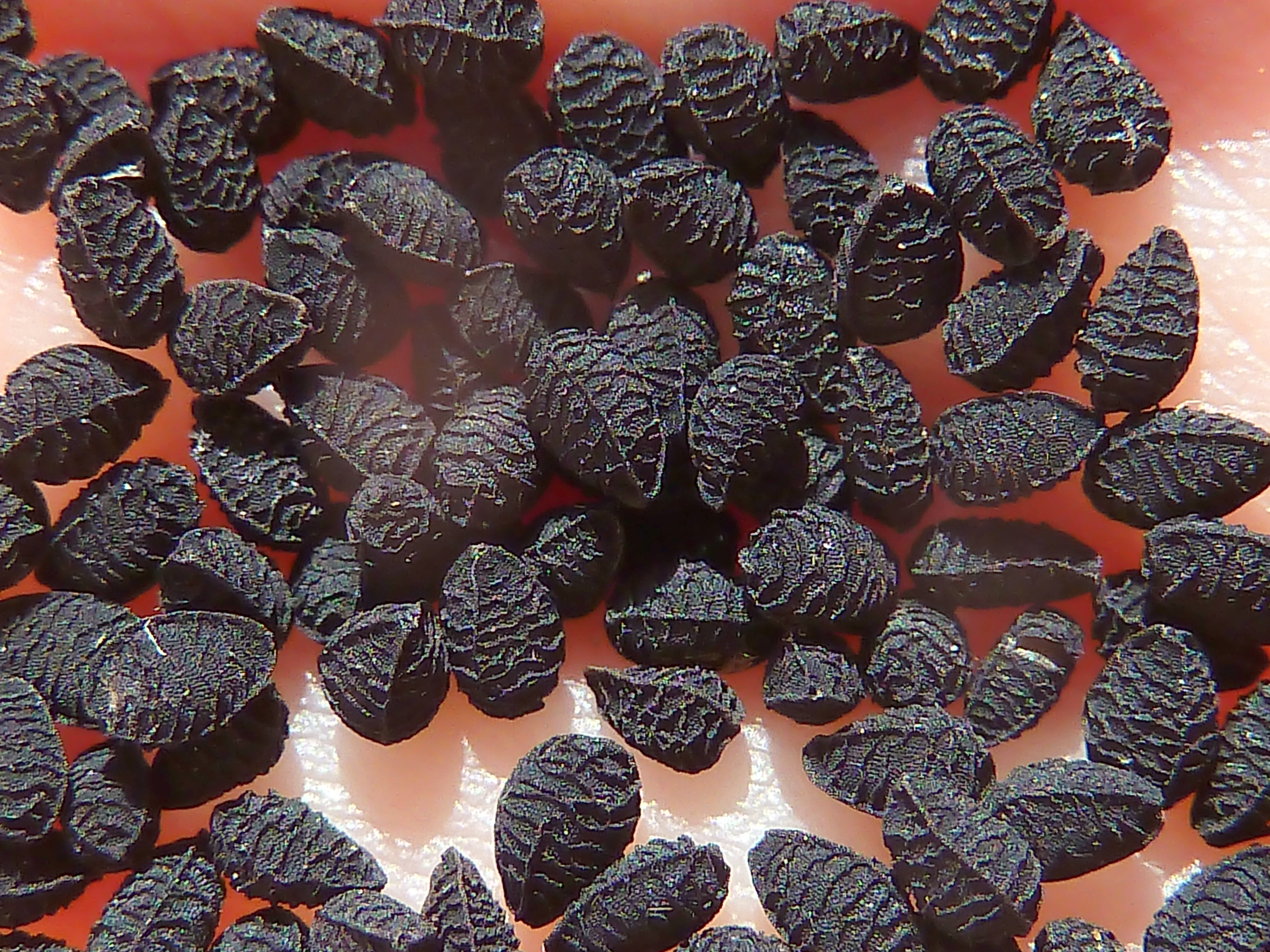
Seeds

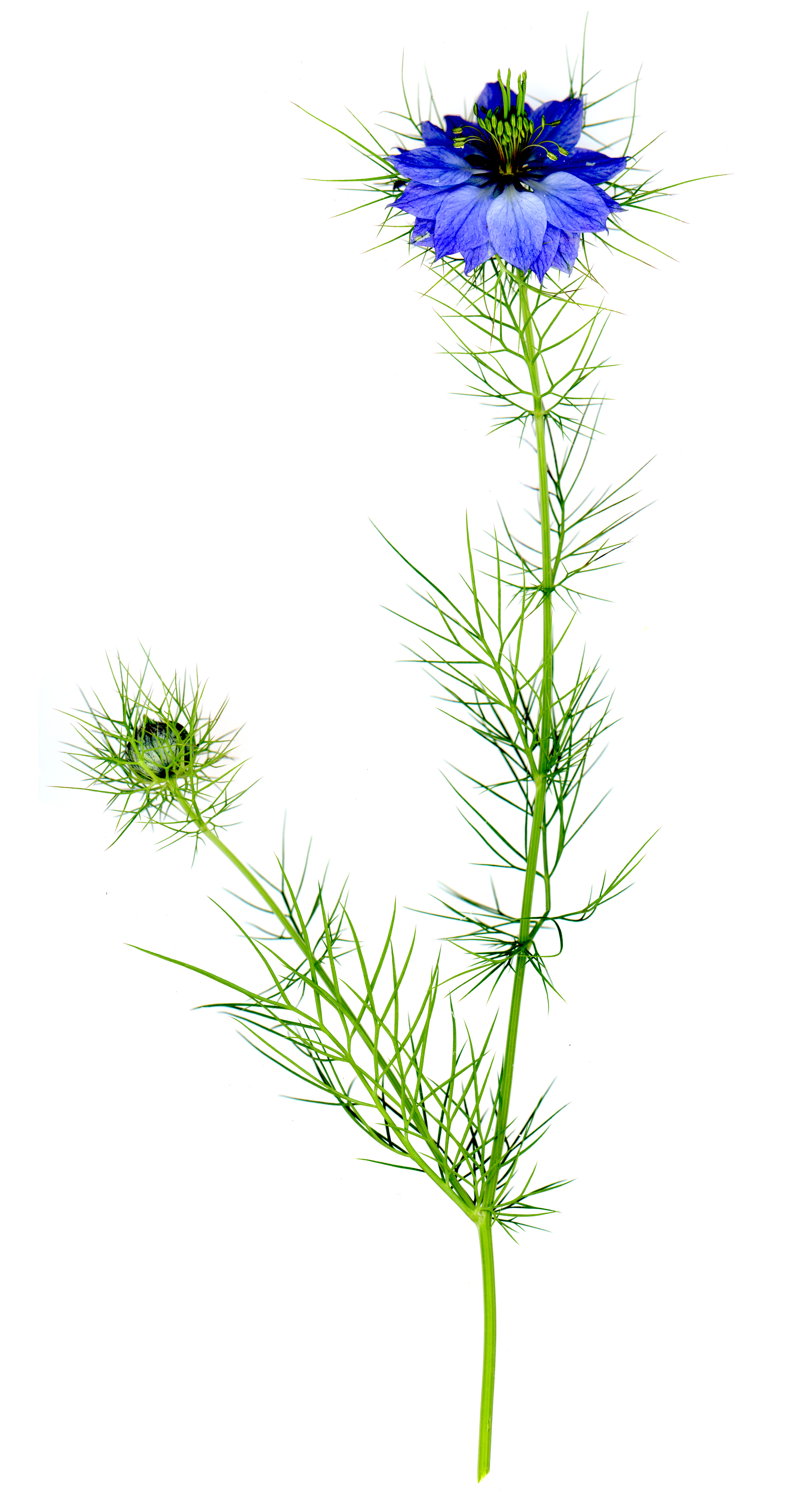

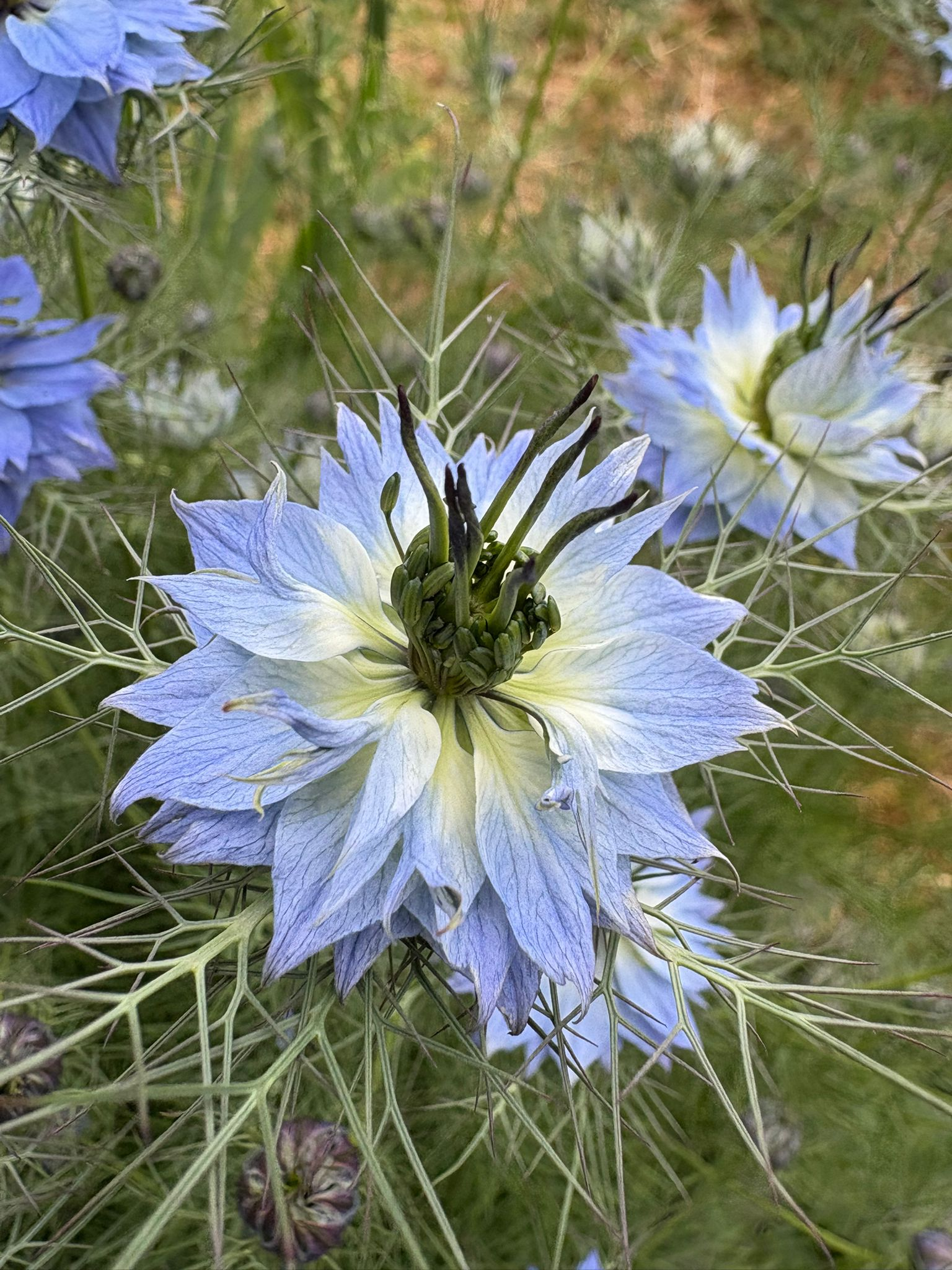
While and blue inflorescence variant

== Cultivation ==
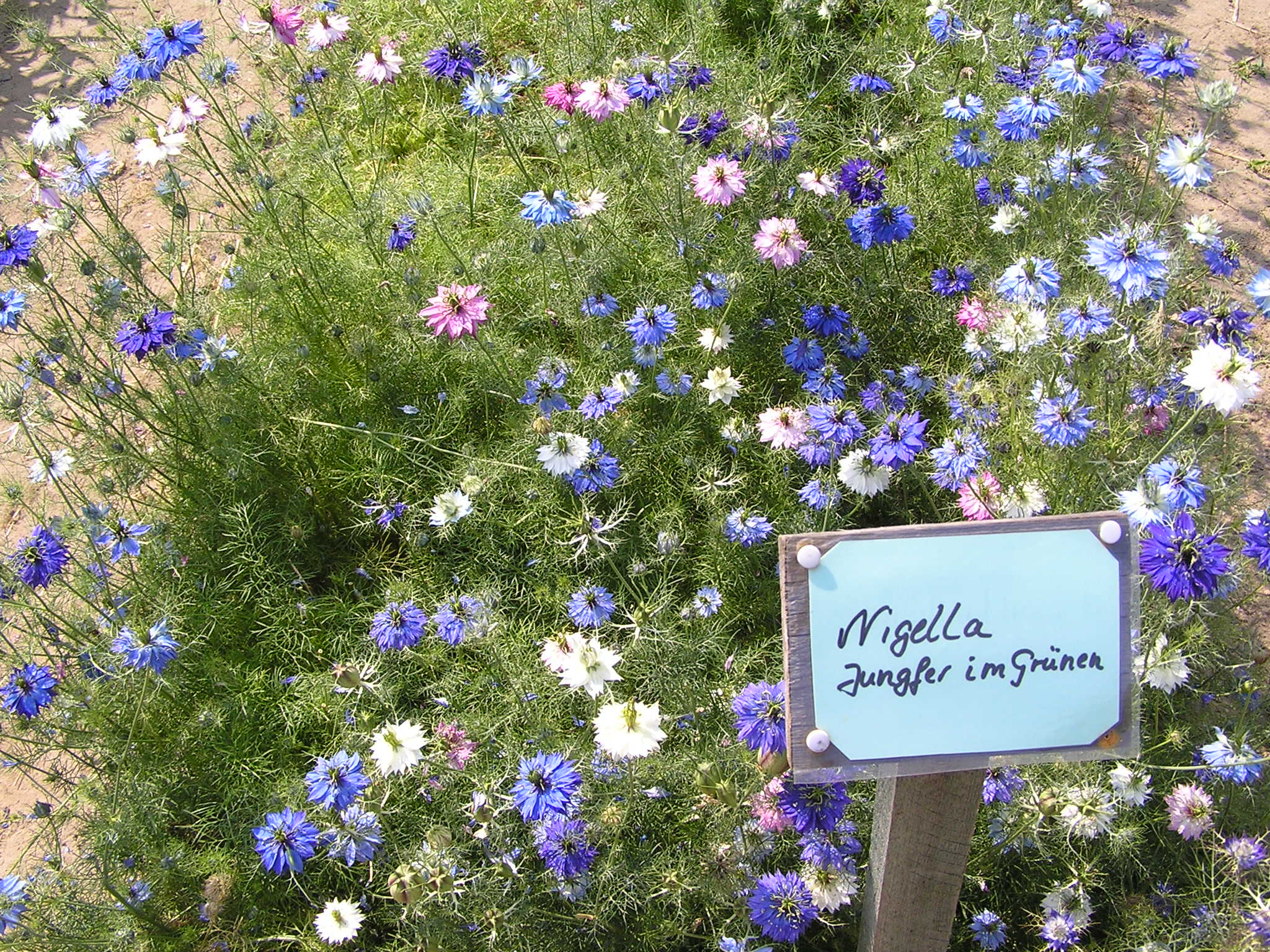
Selection of cultivars

This easily grown plant has been a familiar subject in English cottage gardens since Elizabethan times, admired for its ferny foliage, spiky flowers and bulbous seed-heads. It is now widely cultivated throughout the temperate world, and numerous cultivars have been developed for garden use. 'Persian Jewels' is a mixture of white, pink, lavender and blue flowers. 'Persian Rose' is pale pink. Other cultivars are 'Albion', 'Blue Midget', 'Cambridge Blue', 'Mulberry Rose', and 'Oxford Blue'. 'Dwarf Moody Blue' is around 15 cm (6 in) high. The pale blue ‘Miss Jekyll’ and the double white-flowered 'Miss Jekyll Alba' have gained the Royal Horticultural Society's Award of Garden Merit.

== Related species ==
The related Nigella sativa (and not N. damascena) is the source of the spice variously known as nigella, kalonji or black cumin.

== Toxicity ==
Damascenine is a toxic alkaloid found in Nigella damascena seed.

However, an in vivo study in mice (100 ppm i.p.) and in vitro assessment on human cell lines has not shown any toxicity.
