= Damascenine =

Names
- Preferred IUPAC name Methyl 3-methoxy-2-(methylamino)benzoate
- Other names Nigelline

Identifiers
CAS Number	483-64-7
3D model (JSmol)	Interactive image
ChemSpider	20085
KEGG	C10588
MeSH	C018499
PubChem CID	21368
UNII	2TU4DLG5R3
CompTox Dashboard (EPA)	DTXSID60197480
- InChI: InChI=1S/C10H13NO3/c1-11-9-7(10(12)14-3)5-4-6-8(9)13-2/h4-6,11H,1-3H3 Key: ZRWJIZYZTLTXJI-UHFFFAOYSA-N; InChI=1/C10H13NO3/c1-11-9-7(10(12)14-3)5-4-6-8(9)13-2/h4-6,11H,1-3H3 Key: ZRWJIZYZTLTXJI-UHFFFAOYAR
- SMILES: CNC1=C(C=CC=C1OC)C(=O)OC

Properties
Chemical formula	C_{10}H_{13}NO_{3}
Molar mass	195.2 g/mol
- Except where otherwise noted, data are given for materials in their standard state (at 25 °C [77 °F], 100 kPa). Infobox references

Damascenine is an alkaloid found in the plant Nigella damascena.
