= 2C-MMDA-2 =

Clinical data
- Other names: 2C-2; MMDPEA-2; 6-Methoxy-MDPEA; 2-Methoxy-4,5-methylenedioxyphenethylamine
- Drug class: Serotonin 5-HT_{2} receptor agonist
- ATC code: None

Identifiers
- IUPAC name: 2-(6-methoxy-1,3-benzodioxol-5-yl)ethanamine
- CAS Number: 497096-69-2
- PubChem CID: 21831819
- ChemSpider: 13802346

Chemical and physical data
- Formula: C_{10}H_{13}NO_{3}
- Molar mass: 195.218 g·mol^{−1}
- 3D model (JSmol): Interactive image
- SMILES: COC1=CC2=C(C=C1CCN)OCO2
- InChI: InChI=1S/C10H13NO3/c1-12-8-5-10-9(13-6-14-10)4-7(8)2-3-11/h4-5H,2-3,6,11H2,1H3; Key:VHBCQDKBQRHHPZ-UHFFFAOYSA-N

2C-MMDA-2 (2C-2), also known as MMDPEA-2 or 6-methoxy-MDPEA, as well as 2-methoxy-4,5-methylenedioxyphenethylamine, is a serotonin 5-HT_{2} receptor agonist of the phenethylamine and methylenedioxyphenethylamine families. Along with lophophine (2C-MMDA-1 or MMDPEA-1), it is one of the positional isomers of methoxymethylenedioxyphenethylamine (MMDPEA). 2C-MMDA-2 is also the phenethylamine analogue of MMDA-2.

== Use and effects ==
In his book PiHKAL (Phenethylamines I Have Known and Loved), Alexander Shulgin described testing 2C-MMDA-2 at doses of up to 2.6 mg and observed no effects but did not try higher doses.

== Pharmacology ==
=== Pharmacodynamics ===
2C-MMDA-2 is a full agonist of the serotonin 5-HT_{2A}, 5-HT_{2B}, and 5-HT_{2C} receptors. Its EC_{50} (E_{max}) values were 148 nM (102%) for G_{q} signaling and 589 nM (107%) for β-arrestin2 signaling at the serotonin 5-HT_{2A} receptor, 204 nM (104%) at the serotonin 5-HT_{2B} receptor, and 9.77 nM (109%) at the serotonin 5-HT_{2C} receptor. 2C-MMDA-2 was more potent as a serotonin 5-HT_{2} receptor agonist than mescaline.

== Chemistry ==
=== Synthesis ===
The chemical synthesis of 2C-MMDA-2 has been described.

=== Analogues ===
The NBOMe derivative of 2C-MMDA-2 is 2C2-NBOMe. It is a highly potent serotonin 5-HT_{2} receptor agonist and produces the head-twitch response, a behavioral proxy of psychedelic effects, in rodents.

== History ==
Alexander Shulgin in tested 2C-MMDA-2 in 1963. He described these findings in his 1991 book PiHKAL (Phenethylamines I Have Known and Loved), which is when 2C-MMDA-2 appears to have been first described in the literature. Later, 2C-MMDA-2 was assessed in terms of serotonin receptor activity by Jason Wallach and colleagues in 2023.

== See also ==
- Substituted methylenedioxyphenethylamine
- Substituted methoxyphenethylamine
- Methoxymethylenedioxyphenethylamine
- Lophophine (2C-MMDA-1 or MMDPEA-1)
- 2C-MMDA-3a (MMDPEA-3a)
- 2C2-NBOMe (2C-MMDA-2-NBOMe)
