= Bicuculline =

Chemical compound

Clinical data
- ATC code: none

Identifiers
- IUPAC name: (6R)-6-[(5S)-6-methyl-5,6,7,8-tetrahydro[1,3]dioxolo[4,5-g]isoquinolin-5-yl]furo[3,4-e][1,3]benzodioxol-8(6H)-one
- CAS Number: 485-49-4
- PubChem CID: 10237
- IUPHAR/BPS: 2312
- ChemSpider: 9820
- UNII: Y37615DVKC
- ChEBI: CHEBI:3092
- ChEMBL: ChEMBL417990
- PDB ligand: H0Z (PDBe, RCSB PDB)
- CompTox Dashboard (EPA): DTXSID3042687
- ECHA InfoCard: 100.006.927

Chemical and physical data
- Formula: C_{20}H_{17}NO_{6}
- Molar mass: 367.357 g·mol^{−1}
- 3D model (JSmol): Interactive image
- Melting point: 215 °C (419 °F)
- SMILES: O=C1O[C@H](c3c1c2OCOc2cc3)[C@@H]5c4cc6OCOc6cc4CCN5C
- InChI: InChI=1S/C20H17NO6/c1-21-5-4-10-6-14-15(25-8-24-14)7-12(10)17(21)18-11-2-3-13-19(26-9-23-13)16(11)20(22)27-18/h2-3,6-7,17-18H,4-5,8-9H2,1H3/t17-,18+/m0/s1; Key:IYGYMKDQCDOMRE-ZWKOTPCHSA-N

Bicuculline is a phthalide-isoquinoline compound that is a light-sensitive competitive antagonist of GABA_{A} receptors. It was originally identified in 1932 in plant alkaloid extracts and has been isolated from Dicentra cucullaria, Adlumia fungosa, and several Corydalis species (all in subfamily Fumarioideae, previously known as family Fumariaceae). Since it blocks the inhibitory action of GABA receptors, the action of bicuculline mimics epilepsy; it also causes convulsions. This property is utilized in laboratories around the world in the in vitro study of epilepsy, generally in hippocampal or cortical neurons in prepared brain slices from rodents. This compound is also routinely used to isolate glutamatergic (excitatory amino acid) receptor function.

The action of bicuculline is primarily on the ionotropic GABA_{A} receptors, which are ligand-gated ion channels concerned chiefly with the passing of chloride ions across the cell membrane, thus promoting an inhibitory influence on the target neuron. These receptors are the major targets for benzodiazepines, z-drugs, and related anxiolytic drugs.

The half-maximal inhibitory concentration (IC_{50}) of bicuculline on GABA_{A} receptors is 2 μM +/-0.1 at 40 μM of GABA (GABA half maximal effective concentration, (EC_{50})).

In addition to being a potent GABA_{A} receptor antagonist, bicuculline can be used to block Ca^{2+}-activated potassium channels.

Sensitivity to bicuculline is defined by IUPHAR as a major criterion in the definition of GABA_{A} receptors.

== See also ==
- Picrotoxin
- Hydrastine (very similar in structure)
