= Lines on the Antiquity of Microbes =

Short poem composed by Strickland Gillilan

"Lines on the Antiquity of Microbes", also known simply as "Fleas", is a couplet commonly cited as the shortest poem ever written, composed by American poet Strickland Gillilan in the early 20th century.

The poem reads in full:

Adam
Had 'em.

== Shorter poem ==
"Lines on the Antiquity of Microbes" is frequently said to be the shortest poem in the English language, or the shortest in the world. However, many shorter poems have since been written.

A notable example was composed by boxer Muhammad Ali. On June 4, 1975, after giving a speech at Harvard University, Ali was discussing poetry on stage with journalist George Plimpton. When asked for the shortest poem of all time, Plimpton recited "Fleas" as above, and Ali responded, "I've got one: Me? Whee!!"

According to the Guinness Book of Records, the world's shortest poem is a one-letter poem by Aram Saroyan comprising a four-legged version of the letter "m".
