= 2C-T-17 =

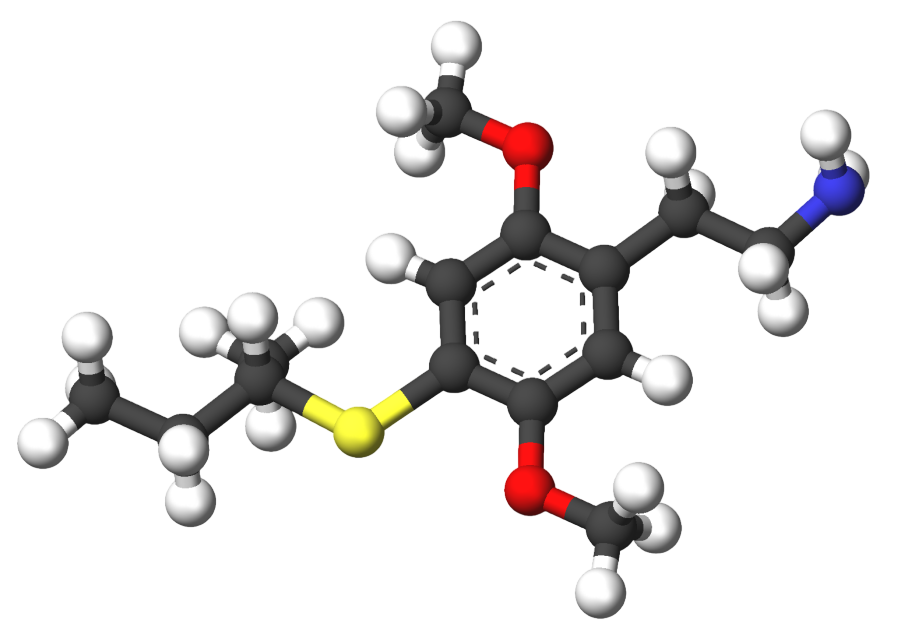

Clinical data
- Other names: 4-sec-Butylthio-2,5-dimethoxyphenethylamine; 2,5-Dimethoxy-4-sec-butylthiophenethylamine; NIMITZ; Nimitz
- Routes of administration: Oral
- Drug class: Serotonergic psychedelic; Hallucinogen
- ATC code: None

Pharmacokinetic data
- Duration of action: 10–15 hours

Identifiers
- IUPAC name: 2-(4-butan-2-ylsulfanyl-2,5-dimethoxyphenyl)ethanamine
- CAS Number: 207740-32-7
- PubChem CID: 44349798
- ChemSpider: 21106230
- UNII: NLC3VH4KZM
- ChEMBL: ChEMBL127284
- CompTox Dashboard (EPA): DTXSID20658365

Chemical and physical data
- Formula: C_{14}H_{23}NO_{2}S
- Molar mass: 269.40 g·mol^{−1}
- 3D model (JSmol): Interactive image
- SMILES: CC(CC)Sc1cc(OC)c(cc1OC)CCN
- InChI: InChI=1S/C14H23NO2S/c1-5-10(2)18-14-9-12(16-3)11(6-7-15)8-13(14)17-4/h8-10H,5-7,15H2,1-4H3; Key:KSZHVRPGICAZOA-UHFFFAOYSA-N

2C-T-17, also known as 4-sec-butylthio-2,5-dimethoxyphenethylamine or as Nimitz, is a psychedelic drug of the phenethylamine and 2C families. It is taken orally.

2C-T-17 was first described in the scientific literature by Alexander Shulgin and colleagues in 1991. Shortly after this, Shulgin described 2C-T-17 in greater detail in his 1991 book PiHKAL (Phenethylamines I Have Known and Loved).

== Use and effects ==
In his book PiHKAL (Phenethylamines I Have Known and Loved), Alexander Shulgin lists 2C-T-17's dose as 60 to 100 mg orally and its duration is 10 to 15 hours. Its onset is 1 hour and peak effects occurred after 3 hours. 2C-T-17 has been described as a "truly heavy psychedelic" but as producing no psychedelic visuals and very little in the way of perceptual changes. User reports described it as having pronounced psychoactive effects, but had difficulty describing exactly what those effects were.

== Toxicity ==
The toxicity of 2C-T-17 is not well-documented. It is much less potent than 2C-T-7, but it may be expected that at very high doses it would display similar toxicity to that of other phenethylamines of the 2C-T family.

== Pharmacology ==
=== Pharmacodynamics ===
The mechanism of action that produces 2C-T-17's hallucinogenic effects has not been specifically established, however it is most likely to result from action as a serotonin 5-HT_{2A} receptor agonist in the brain, a mechanism of action shared by all of the hallucinogenic tryptamines and phenethylamines for which the mechanism of action is known.

== Chemistry ==
2C-T-17 is the 2 carbon homologue of Aleph-17, which has never been synthesized. The full chemical name is 2-[4-(2-butyl thio)-2,5-dimethoxy phenyl]ethanamine. The drug has structural properties similar to drugs in the 2C-T series, with the most closely related compounds being 2C-T-7 and 2C-T-8.

=== Synthesis ===
The chemical synthesis of 2C-T-17 has been described.

== History ==
2C-T-17 was first described in the scientific literature by Alexander Shulgin and colleagues in a journal article in 1991. Shortly thereafter, it was described in greater detail by Shulgin in his 1991 book PiHKAL (Phenethylamines I Have Known and Loved).

== Society and culture ==
=== Legal status ===
==== Canada ====
As of October 31, 2016, 2C-T-17 is a controlled substance (Schedule III) in Canada.

==== United Kingdom ====
This substance is a Class A drug in the Drugs controlled by the UK Misuse of Drugs Act.

==== United States ====
2C-T-17 is not illegal, but possession and sales of 2C-T-17 could be prosecuted under the Federal Analog Act in the United States because of its structural similarities to 2C-T-7.

== See also ==
- 2C (psychedelics)
- ASR-3001 (5-MeO-iPALT)
- MiPT
