= N-Acetyldopamine =

Identifiers
CAS Number	2494-12-4
3D model (JSmol)	Interactive image
ChEBI	CHEBI:125678
ChEMBL	ChEMBL137743
ChemSpider	90825
PubChem CID	100526
UNII	AYU97G37EM
CompTox Dashboard (EPA)	DTXSID70179656
- InChI: InChI=1S/C10H13NO3/c1-7(12)11-5-4-8-2-3-9(13)10(14)6-8/h2-3,6,13-14H,4-5H2,1H3,(H,11,12) Key: OFSAJYZMIPNPHE-UHFFFAOYSA-N
- SMILES: CC(=O)NCCC1=CC(=C(C=C1)O)O

Properties
Chemical formula	C_{10}H_{13}NO_{3}
Molar mass	195.218 g·mol^{−1}
Appearance	Colorless solid

Hazards
- GHS labelling
Pictograms	(GHS07: Exclamation mark)
Signal word	Warning
Hazard statements	H315, H319, H335
Precautionary statements	P261, P264, P271, P280, P302+P352, P304+P340, P305+P351+P338, P312, P321, P332+P313, P337+P313, P362, P403+P233, P405, P501
- Except where otherwise noted, data are given for materials in their standard state (at 25 °C [77 °F], 100 kPa). Infobox references

N-Acetyldopamine is the organic compound with the formula CH_{3}C(O)NHCH_{2}CH_{2}C_{6}H_{3}(OH)_{2}. It is the N-acetylated derivative of dopamine. This compound is a reactive intermediate in sclerotization, the process by which insect cuticles are formed by hardening molecular precursors. The catechol substituent is susceptible to redox and crosslinking.
