= Hydrastine =

Chemical compound

Clinical data
- ATC code: none

Pharmacokinetic data
- Metabolism: Hepatic
- Excretion: Renal

Identifiers
- IUPAC name: 6,7-Dimethoxy-3-(6-methyl-5,6,7,8-tetrahydro[1,3]dioxolo[4,5-g]isoquinolin-5-yl)-2-benzofuran-1(3H)-one
- CAS Number: 118-08-1
- PubChem CID: 197835
- ChemSpider: 171234
- UNII: 8890V3217X
- ChEMBL: ChEMBL497942
- CompTox Dashboard (EPA): DTXSID9025409
- ECHA InfoCard: 100.003.849

Chemical and physical data
- Formula: C_{21}H_{21}NO_{6}
- Molar mass: 383.400 g·mol^{−1}
- 3D model (JSmol): Interactive image
- Melting point: 132 °C (270 °F)
- SMILES: O=C2O[C@@H](c1ccc(OC)c(OC)c12)[C@@H]5N(C)CCc4c5cc3OCOc3c4
- InChI: InChI=1S/C21H21NO6/c1-22-7-6-11-8-15-16(27-10-26-15)9-13(11)18(22)19-12-4-5-14(24-2)20(25-3)17(12)21(23)28-19/h4-5,8-9,18-19H,6-7,10H2,1-3H3/t18-,19+/m1/s1; Key:JZUTXVTYJDCMDU-MOPGFXCFSA-N

Hydrastine is an isoquinoline alkaloid which was discovered in 1851 by Alfred P. Durand. Nitric acid induced hydrolysis of hydrastine yields hydrastinine, which was patented by Bayer as a haemostatic drug in the early 1900s. It is present in Hydrastis canadensis (thus the name) and other plants of the family Ranunculaceae.

== Total synthesis ==
The first attempt for the total synthesis of hydrastine was reported by Sir Robert Robinson and co-workers in 1931. Following studies where the synthesis of the key lactonic amide intermediate (structure 4 in figure) was the most troublesome, the major breakthrough was achieved in 1981 when J. R. Falck and co-workers reported a four-step total synthesis of hydrastine from simple starting materials. The key step in the Falck synthesis was using a Passerini reaction to construct the lactonic amide intermediate 4.

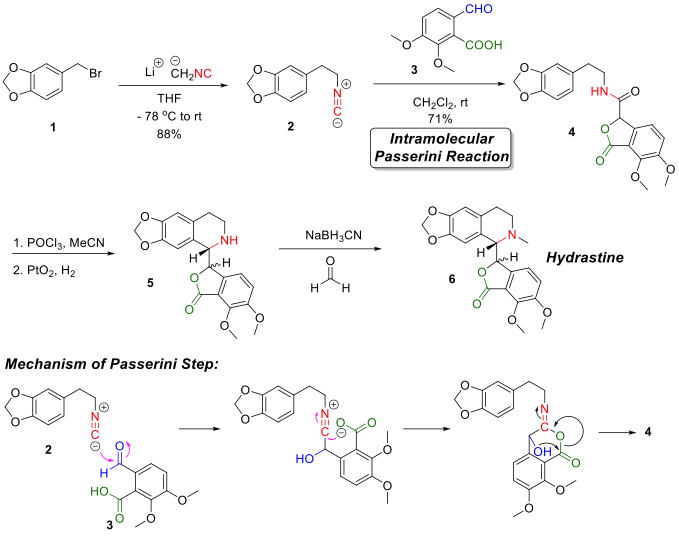

Starting from a simple phenylbromide variant 1, alkylation reaction with lithium methylisocyanide gives the isocyanide intermediate 2. Reacting isocyanide intermediate 2 with opianic acid 3 initiated the intramolecular Passerini reaction to give the key lactonic amide intermediate 4. The tetrahydro-isoquinolin ring was formed by first a ring-closure reaction under dehydration conditions using POCl3 and then a catalyzed hydrogenation using PtO2 as the catalyst. Finally, hydrastine was synthesized by installing the N-methyl group via reductive amination reaction with formaldehyde.

== Biological action ==
Hydrastine acts as a convulsant in mice. It appears to do this by binding to bicuculline-sensitive GABA_{A} receptors as a potent competitive antagonist. The action appears to be largely mediated by the (+) enantiomer (IC_{50} of 0.4µM), as (-)-hydrastine is 180 times less potent in regards to this effect.

== See also ==
- Bicuculline (very similar in structure)
