= Hydrastinine =

Chemical compound

Clinical data
- Pregnancy category: ?
- ATC code: none

Pharmacokinetic data
- Metabolism: Hepatic
- Excretion: Renal

Identifiers
- IUPAC name: 6-Methyl-5,6,7,8-tetrahydro[1,3]dioxolo[4,5-g]isoquinolin-5-ol
- CAS Number: 6592-85-4
- PubChem CID: 3638
- ChemSpider: 3512
- UNII: V1I0L48X6E
- ChEMBL: ChEMBL1623232
- CompTox Dashboard (EPA): DTXSID3048073
- ECHA InfoCard: 100.026.849

Chemical and physical data
- Formula: C_{11}H_{13}NO_{3}
- Molar mass: 207.229 g·mol^{−1}
- 3D model (JSmol): Interactive image
- SMILES: O1c2c(OC1)cc3c(c2)CCN(C3O)C
- InChI: InChI=1S/C11H13NO3/c1-12-3-2-7-4-9-10(15-6-14-9)5-8(7)11(12)13/h4-5,11,13H,2-3,6H2,1H3; Key:YOJQZPVUNUQTDF-UHFFFAOYSA-N

Hydrastinine is a semisynthetic tetrahydroisoquinoline alkaloid made via the nitric acid induced hydrolysis of the alkaloid hydrastine hydrochloride, which is extracted from Hydrastis canadensis L. (Ranunculaceae). The drug was patented by Bayer as a haemostatic drug during the 1910s.

The first known synthesis of methylenedioxymethamphetamine (MDMA) was actually an intermediate in the synthesis of the methylated analogue of hydrastinine, methylhydrastinine. It was only reviewed for its activity many years after its original synthesis.

Hydrastinine has also been found as a major unwanted side product in MDMA made by the reductive amination of 3,4-methylenedioxyphenylpropan-2-one and methylamine.

== See also ==
- Substituted tetrahydroisoquinoline
