= HOT-7 =

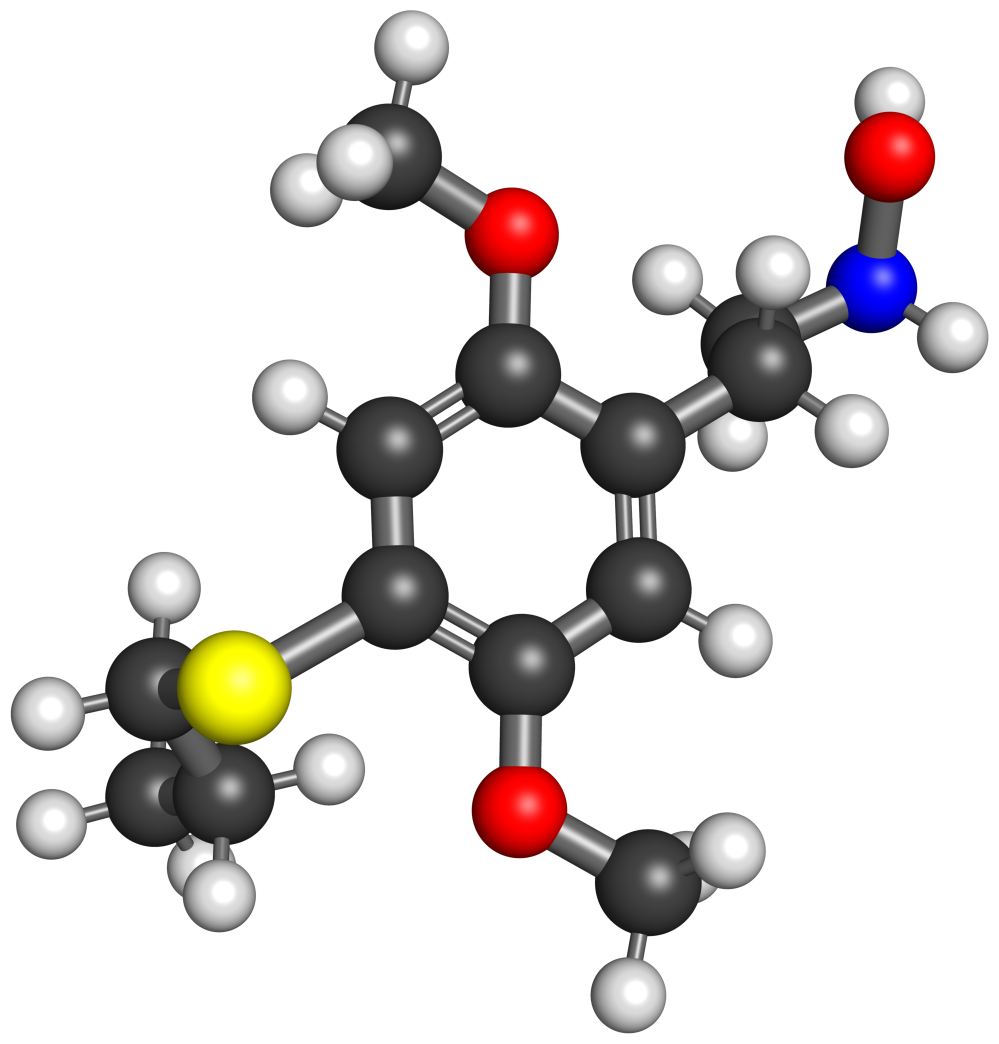

Clinical data
- Other names: 4-Propylthio-2,5-dimethoxy-N-hydroxyphenethylamine; 2,5-Dimethoxy-4-propylthio-N-hydroxyphenethylamine; N-Hydroxy-2C-T-7; N-OH-2C-T-7
- Routes of administration: Oral
- Drug class: Serotonergic psychedelic; Hallucinogen
- ATC code: None

Pharmacokinetic data
- Metabolites: Possibly 2C-T-7
- Onset of action: Unknown
- Duration of action: 6–8 hours

Identifiers
- IUPAC name: 2-[2,5-Dimethoxy-4-(propylsulfanyl)phenyl]-N-hydroxyethan-1-amine
- CAS Number: 207740-39-4
- PubChem CID: 44350017
- ChemSpider: 21106321
- UNII: J43NT74JXX
- ChEMBL: ChEMBL127582
- CompTox Dashboard (EPA): DTXSID90658372

Chemical and physical data
- Formula: C_{13}H_{21}NO_{3}S
- Molar mass: 271.38 g·mol^{−1}
- 3D model (JSmol): Interactive image
- SMILES: COc1cc(SCCC)c(cc1CCNO)OC
- InChI: InChI=1S/C13H21NO3S/c1-4-7-18-13-9-11(16-2)10(5-6-14-15)8-12(13)17-3/h8-9,14-15H,4-7H2,1-3H3; Key:ASTNLROMDNGJLS-UHFFFAOYSA-N

HOT-7, also known as 4-propylthio-2,5-dimethoxy-N-hydroxyphenethylamine or as N-hydroxy-2C-T-7, is a psychedelic drug of the phenethylamine, 2C, and HOT-x families. It is the N-hydroxy derivative of 2C-T-7. The drug is taken orally.

== Use and effects ==
In his book PiHKAL (Phenethylamines I Have Known and Loved), Alexander Shulgin lists HOT-7's dose range as 15 to 20 mg orally and its duration as 6 to 8 hours. The drug's onset and peak of effects were not described. HOT-7's properties are similar to those of 2C-T-7, which has a dose of 10 to 30 mg orally and a duration of 8 to 15 hours, although HOT-7 may have a somewhat shorter duration. HOT-7 may act as a prodrug of 2C-T-7.

The effects of HOT-7 have been reported to include being "quite psychedelic", very rich in closed-eye imagery, not as much in terms of open-eye visuals, very good for interpretive and conceptual thinking, emotional changes, feeling "smoothly stoned", lightheadedness, alcohol-like tipsiness and wooziness, social avoidance, and gastrointestinal disturbances.

== Chemistry ==
=== Synthesis ===
The chemical synthesis of HOT-7 has been described.

=== Analogues ===
Analogues of HOT-7 include 2C-T-7, HOT-2 (N-hydroxy-2C-T-2), and HOT-17 (N-hydroxy-2C-T-17), among others.

== History ==
HOT-7 was first described in the literature by Alexander Shulgin in his 1991 book PiHKAL (Phenethylamines I Have Known and Loved).

== Society and culture ==
=== Legal status ===
==== Canada ====
HOT-7 is a controlled substance in Canada under phenethylamine blanket-ban language.

==== United Kingdom ====
This substance is a Class A drug in the Drugs controlled by the UK Misuse of Drugs Act.

== See also ==
- HOT-x (psychedelics)
