= 3,4-Methylenedioxy-N-hydroxyamphetamine =

Psychedelic and entactogen

MDOH

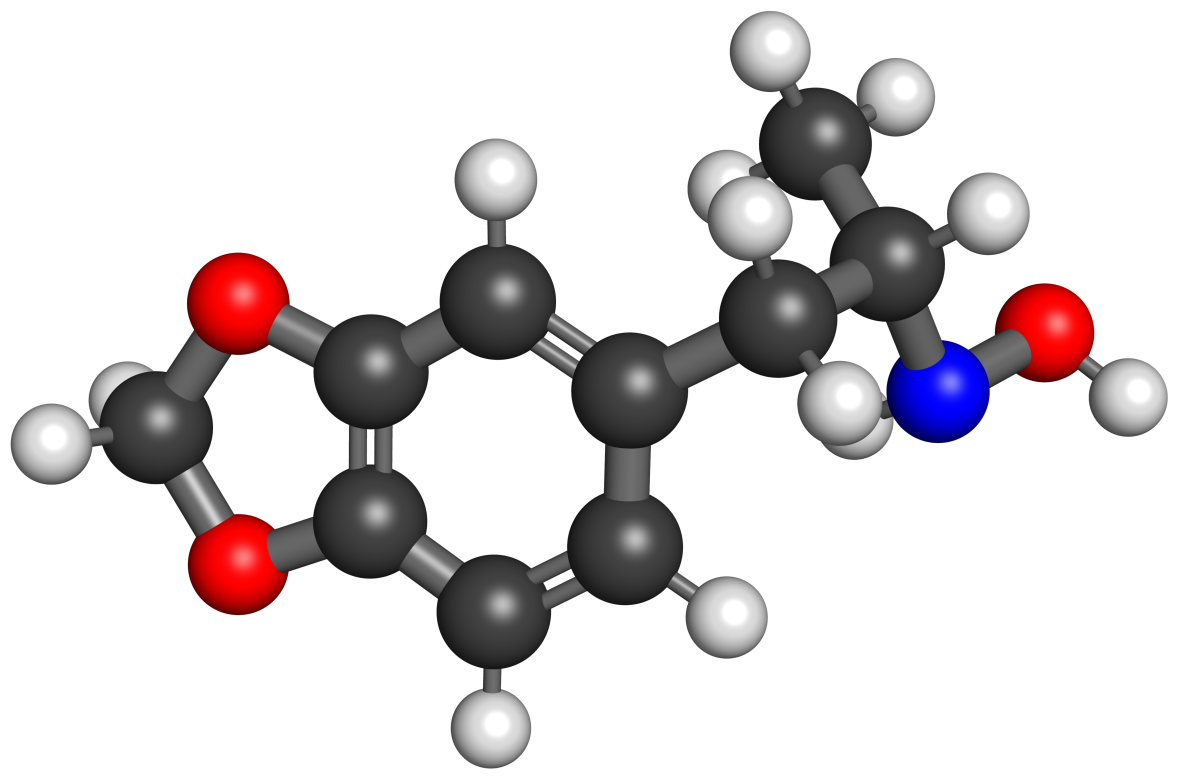

Clinical data
- Other names: MDOH; MDH; N-Hydroxy-MDA
- Routes of administration: Oral
- Drug class: Serotonergic psychedelic; Hallucinogen; Entactogen
- ATC code: None

Legal status
- Legal status: CA: Schedule I; DE: Anlage I (Authorized scientific use only); UK: Class A; US: Schedule I; UN: Psychotropic Schedule I

Pharmacokinetic data
- Duration of action: 3–6 hours

Identifiers
- IUPAC name: N-[1-(1,3-benzodioxol-5-yl)propan-2-yl]hydroxylamine
- CAS Number: 74698-47-8
- PubChem CID: 98528
- ChemSpider: 88979
- UNII: SJE1T2B1A7
- KEGG: C22807
- CompTox Dashboard (EPA): DTXSID30860972

Chemical and physical data
- Formula: C_{10}H_{13}NO_{3}
- Molar mass: 195.218 g·mol^{−1}
- 3D model (JSmol): Interactive image
- SMILES: CC(CC1=CC2=C(C=C1)OCO2)NO
- InChI: InChI=1S/C10H13NO3/c1-7(11-12)4-8-2-3-9-10(5-8)14-6-13-9/h2-3,5,7,11-12H,4,6H2,1H3; Key:FNDCTJYFKOQGTL-UHFFFAOYSA-N

3,4-Methylenedioxy-N-hydroxyamphetamine (MDOH, MDH), also known as N-hydroxy-MDA, is an entactogen, psychedelic, and stimulant of the phenethylamine, amphetamine, and MDxx families. It is the N-hydroxy homologue of MDA, and the N-desmethyl homologue of FLEA (MDMOH).

== Use and effects ==
In his book PiHKAL (Phenethylamines I Have Known and Loved), Alexander Shulgin listed the dose range as 100 to 160 mg orally and its duration as approximately 3 to 6 hours. He describes MDOH as being very psychedelic and producing increased pleasure in beauty and nature. Shulgin also mentioned several negative side effects also seen with MDMA ("Ecstasy") such as difficulty urinating and internal dryness. He has noted that the properties and effects of MDOH are very similar or near-identical to those of MDA and that MDOH might be converted into MDA in the body.

== Chemistry ==
=== Synthesis ===
The chemical synthesis of MDOH has been described.

=== Analogues ===
Analogues of MDOH include MDA and FLEA (MDMOH), among others.

== Society and culture ==
=== Legal status ===
==== Canada ====
MDOH is a controlled substance in Canada.

==== United States ====
MDOH is a schedule I controlled substance in the United States.

== See also ==
- Substituted methylenedioxyphenethylamine
- HOT-x (psychedelics)
- N-Hydroxyamphetamine
- N-Hydroxy-DOM
- N-Hydroxy-AMT
