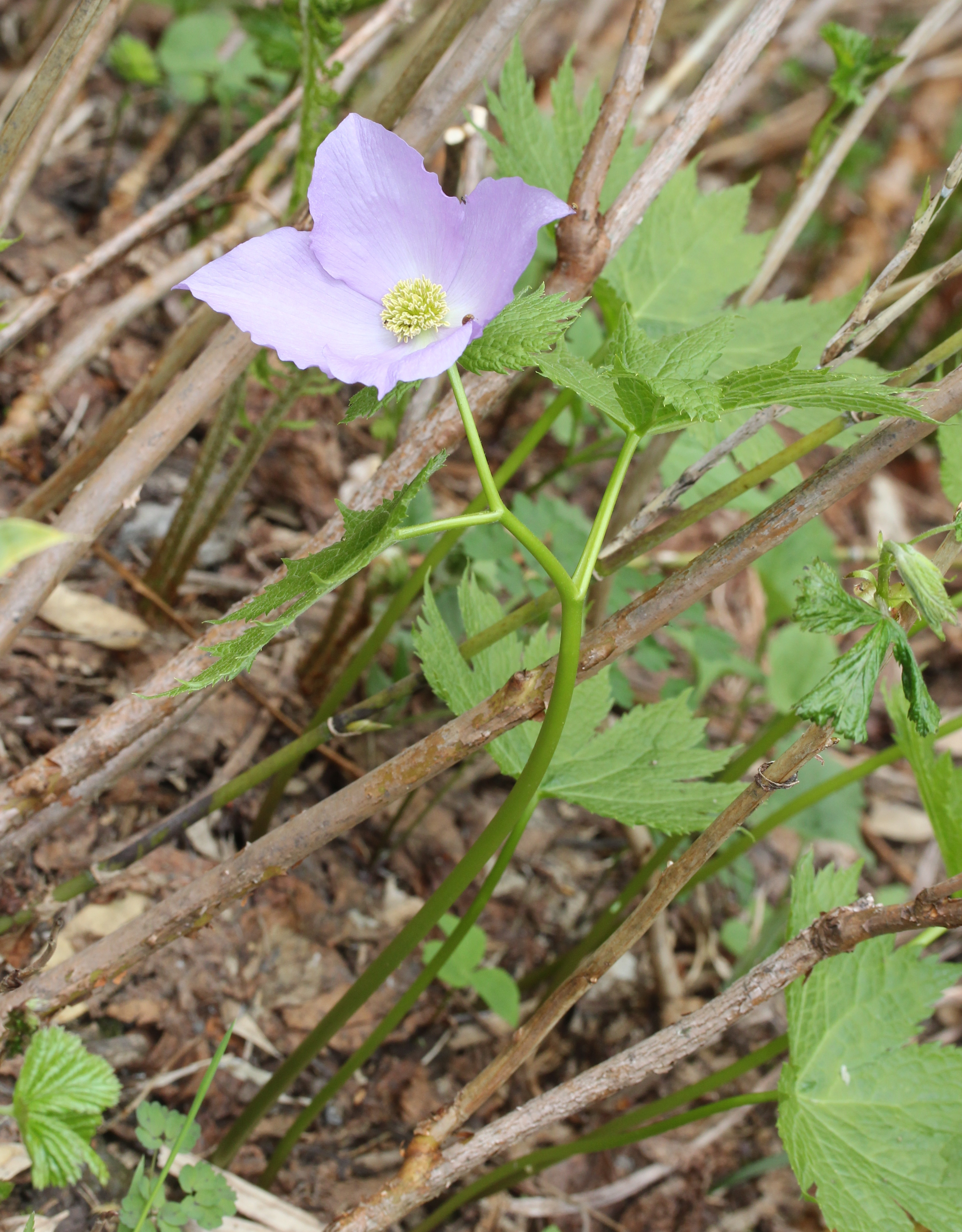

Scientific classification
- Kingdom: Plantae
- Clade: Tracheophytes
- Clade: Angiosperms
- Clade: Eudicots
- Order: Ranunculales
- Family: Ranunculaceae
- Subfamily: Glaucidioideae; Loconte
- Genus: Glaucidium; Siebold & Zucc.
- Species: G. palmatum

Binomial name
- Glaucidium palmatum Siebold & Zucc.

= Glaucidium palmatum =

Species of flowering plant

Glaucidium is a genus of plants in family Ranunculaceae, comprising a single species Glaucidium palmatum (Japanese wood poppy; シラネアオイ Shirane-aoi). It is endemic to northern and eastern Japan on Hokkaidō and northeastern Honshū on mountains close to the Sea of Japan.

It is a rhizomatous herbaceous perennial plant growing to 40 cm tall with a rigid stem with two large (20 cm diameter) palmately lobed leaves at the top and small membraneous leaves lower on the stem. The flower is produced singly at the top of the stem, 8 cm in diameter, with four pink to pale purple (rarely white) petaloid sepals, numerous stamens and two carpels. The fruit is a cluster of follicles.

It is sometimes placed in its own family Glaucidiaceae, or in the past in the family Paeoniaceae. Paeoniaceae, however, has now been shown unequivocally to belong in Saxifragales, while Glaucidium is firmly in the family Ranunculaceae.

In cultivation, Glaucidium palmatum prefers a cool, moist, sheltered position in partial shade.
