= 3,4-Methylenedioxyphenethylamine =

Chemical compound

MDPEA

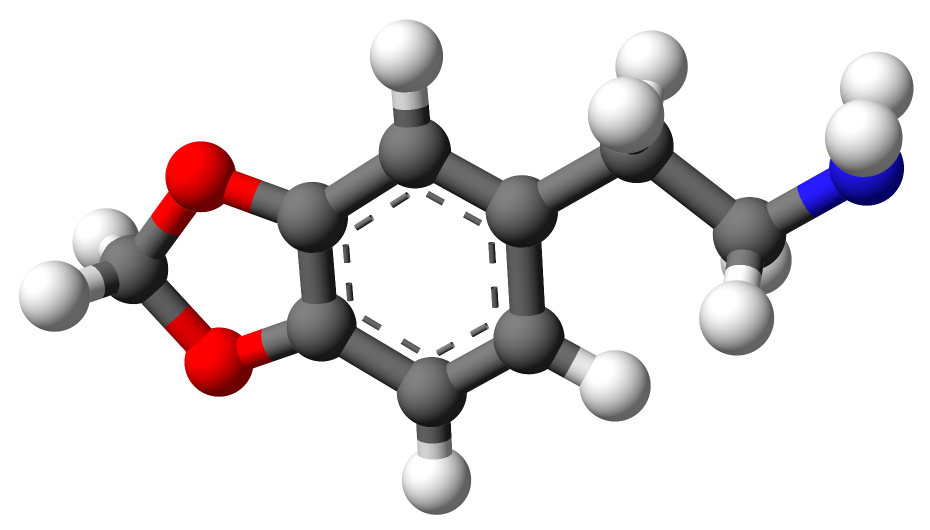

Clinical data
- Other names: 3,4-Methylenedioxyphenethylamine; Methyleneddioxyphenethylamine; 3,4-MDPEA; Homopiperonylamine; EA-1297

Legal status
- Legal status: IV-P (Poland)

Identifiers
- IUPAC name: 2-(1,3-benzodioxol-5-yl)ethanamine
- CAS Number: 1484-85-1
- PubChem CID: 73874
- ChemSpider: 66508
- UNII: F2J2U8J2G5
- CompTox Dashboard (EPA): DTXSID00163982
- ECHA InfoCard: 100.014.601

Chemical and physical data
- Formula: C_{9}H_{11}NO_{2}
- Molar mass: 165.192 g·mol^{−1}
- 3D model (JSmol): Interactive image
- SMILES: C1OC2=C(O1)C=C(C=C2)CCN
- InChI: InChI=1S/C9H11NO2/c10-4-3-7-1-2-8-9(5-7)12-6-11-8/h1-2,5H,3-4,6,10H2; Key:RRIRDPSOCUCGBV-UHFFFAOYSA-N

MDPEA, also known as 3,4-methylenedioxyphenethylamine or as homopiperonylamine, is a possible psychoactive drug of the phenethylamine and methylenedioxyphenethylamine families. It is the 3,4-methylenedioxy derivative of phenethylamine (PEA). The drug is structurally related to 3,4-methylenedioxyamphetamine (MDA), but lacks the methyl group at the α carbon. It is a key parent compound of a large group of compounds known as entactogens such as MDMA ("ecstasy").

== Use and effects ==
According to Alexander Shulgin in his book PiHKAL (Phenethylamines I Have Known and Loved), MDPEA was inactive at doses of up to 300 mg orally. This is likely because of extensive first-pass metabolism by the enzyme monoamine oxidase (MAO). However, if MDPEA were either used in high enough of doses (e.g., 1–2 grams), or in combination with a monoamine oxidase inhibitor (MAOI), it is probable that it would become active, though it would likely have a relatively short duration. This idea is similar in concept to the use of monoamine oxidase A (MAO-A) inhibitors to augment dimethyltryptamine (DMT) as in ayahuasca and of monoamine oxidase B (MAO-B) inhibitors to potentiate phenethylamine (PEA).

Besides being evaluated by Shulgin, MDPEA was studied at Edgewood Arsenal in the 1950s and was administered to humans at doses of up to 5.0 mg/kg (350 mg for a 70-kg person) by intravenous injection, although the results of these tests do not seem to have been released.

== Pharmacology ==
=== Pharmacodynamics ===
MDPEA produces sympathomimetic effects when administered intravenously at sufficiently high doses in dogs. It was about half as potent in this regard as PEA. The effects and toxicity of MDPEA in various animal species via intravenous injection have been studied and described.

== Chemistry ==
=== Properties ===
The predicted log P of MDPEA is 1.2.,

=== Synthesis ===
The chemical synthesis of MDPEA has been described.

=== Analogues ===
Analogues of MDPEA include 3,4-methylenedioxy-N-methylphenethylamine (MDMPEA), lophophine (5-methoxy-MDPEA), mescaline (3,4,5-trimethoxyphenethylamine), 3,4-methylenedioxyamphetamine (MDA), and 3,4-methylenedioxy-N-methylamphetamine (MDMA), among others.

== History ==
MDPEA was first described in the scientific literature by Gordon Alles by 1959. It was studied at Edgewood Arsenal under the code name EA-1297 in the 1950s, being administered by humans in 1952. The drug was described by Alexander Shulgin in his 1991 book PiHKAL (Phenethylamines I Have Known and Loved).

== Society and culture ==
=== Legal status ===
==== Poland ====
MDPEA is a controlled substance in Poland.

== See also ==
- Substituted methylenedioxyphenethylamine
