= Lophophine =

Chemical compound

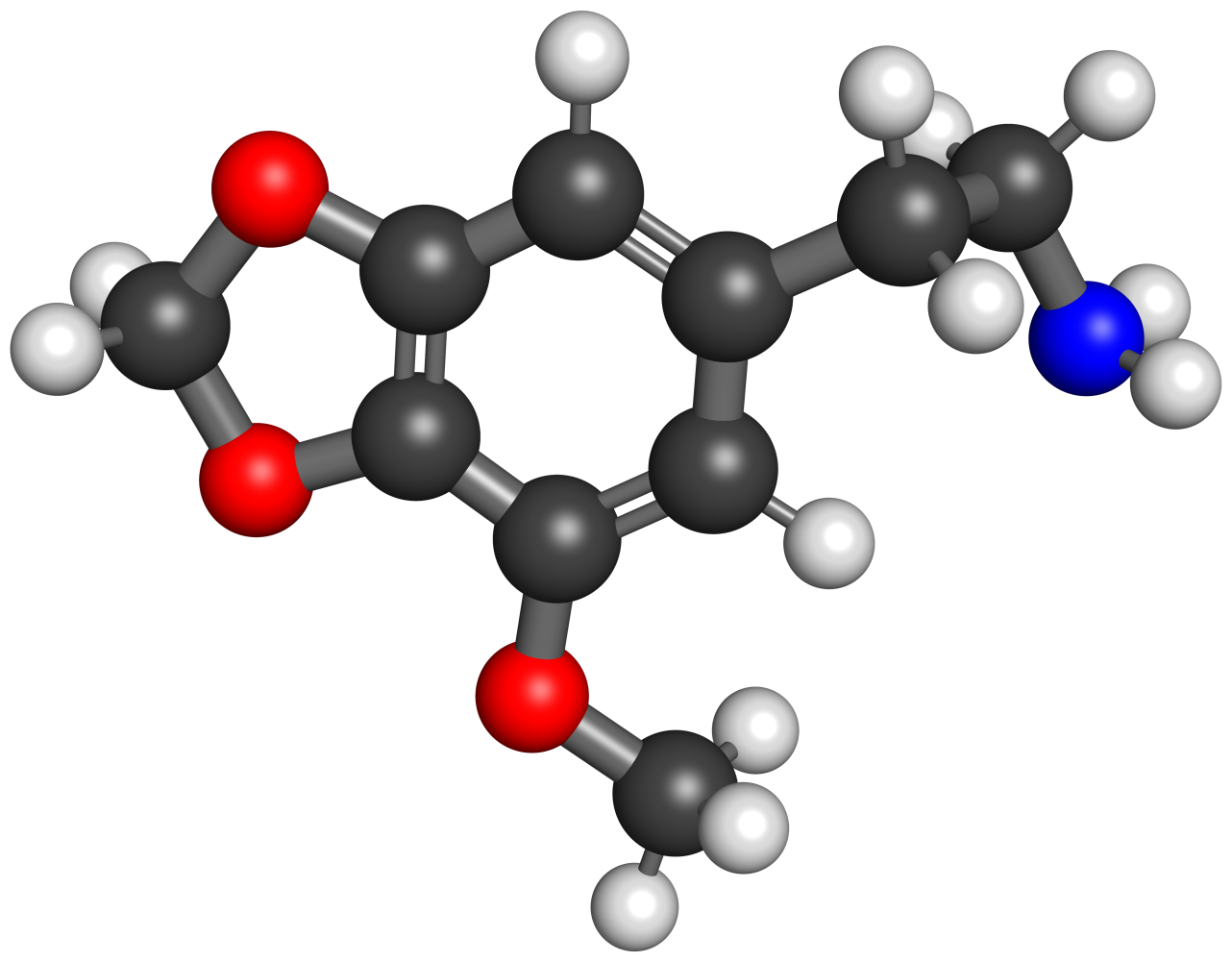

Clinical data
- Other names: 2C-MMDA; 2C-MMDA-1; MMDPEA; MMDPEA-1; 3-Methoxy-4,5-methylenedioxyphenethylamine; 5-Methoxy-MDPEA
- Routes of administration: Oral
- Drug class: Serotonergic psychedelic; Hallucinogen
- ATC code: None

Legal status
- Legal status: Uncontrolled (but may be covered under the Federal Analogue Act in the United States and under similar bills in other countries due to its similarity to mescaline and MMDA)

Identifiers
- IUPAC name: 2-(7-methoxy-1,3-benzodioxol-5-yl)ethanamine
- CAS Number: 23693-38-1
- PubChem CID: 90239
- ChemSpider: 81465
- UNII: C68IB79RC2
- ChEMBL: ChEMBL159620
- CompTox Dashboard (EPA): DTXSID80178357
- ECHA InfoCard: 100.041.645

Chemical and physical data
- Formula: C_{10}H_{13}NO_{3}
- Molar mass: 195.218 g·mol^{−1}
- 3D model (JSmol): Interactive image
- SMILES: O1c2cc(cc(OC)c2OC1)CCN
- InChI: InChI=1S/C10H13NO3/c1-12-8-4-7(2-3-11)5-9-10(8)14-6-13-9/h4-5H,2-3,6,11H2,1H3; Key:ORXQUAPZHKCCAX-UHFFFAOYSA-N

Lophophine, also known as 2C-MMDA-1, 5-methoxy-MDPEA, or 3-methoxy-4,5-methylenedioxyphenethylamine (MMDPEA or MMDPEA-1), is a psychedelic drug of the methylenedioxyphenethylamine family. It is the α-demethylated homologue of MMDA, and is also closely related to mescaline (3,4,5-trimethoxyphenethylamine) and MDPEA. Lophophine has been encountered as a novel designer drug.

== Use and effects ==
Alexander Shulgin reported in PiHKAL (Phenethylamines I Have Known and Loved) and other publications that lophophine is active in the dose range of 150 to 250 mg orally. He states that at these doses, lophophine has some similarity to mescaline in action, in producing a peaceful elevation of mood, euphoria, and mild enhancement of visual perception, but without the generation of closed-eye mental imagery. Shulgin also notes that, in contrast to mescaline, lophophine causes no nausea. He estimated that it was about twice the potency of mescaline.

== Chemistry ==
Lophophine, also known as 3-methoxy-4,5-methylenedioxyphenethylamine, is a phenethylamine and methylenedioxyphenethylamine (MDxx) derivative.

=== Synthesis ===
The chemical synthesis of lophophine has been described.

=== Analogues ===
Analogues of lophophine (5-methoxy-MDPEA or 2C-MMDA-1) include mescaline (3,4,5-trimethoxyphenethylamine), 3,4-methylenedioxyphenethylamine (MDPEA), 2C-MMDA-2 (MMDPEA-2), 2C-MMDA-3a (MMDPEA-3a), and MMDA (5-methoxy-MDA), among others.

== Natural occurrence ==
Alexander Shulgin originally suggested that lophophine may be a natural constituent of peyote (Lophophora williamsii) due to it being the only logical chemical intermediate for the biosynthesis of several tetrahydroisoquinolines known to be present in this cactus species. Subsequently, lophophine was indeed shown to be a minor component of both peyote and San Pedro cactus.

== History ==
Lophophine was encountered as a novel designer drug in Europe in 2023.

== Society and culture ==
=== Legal status ===
==== Canada ====
Lophophine is controlled substance in Canada under phenethylamine blanket-ban language.

==== United States ====
Lophophine is not an explicitly controlled substance in the United States. However, it could be considered a controlled substance under the Federal Analogue Act if intended for human consumption.

== See also ==
- Substituted methylenedioxyphenethylamine
- Substituted methoxyphenethylamine
- Scaline
