= HOT-2 =

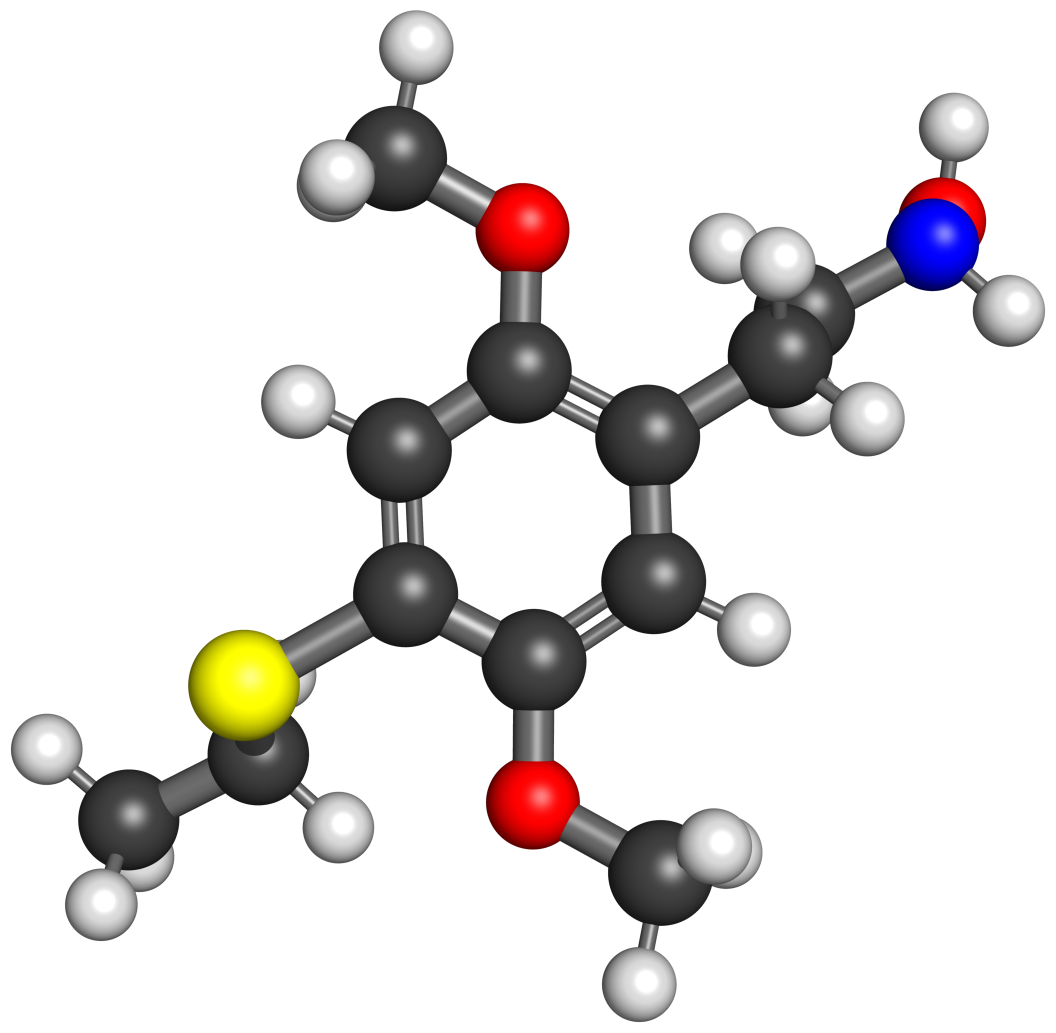

Clinical data
- Other names: 4-Ethylthio-2,5-dimethoxy-N-hydroxyphenethylamine; 2,5-Dimethoxy-4-ethylthio-N-hydroxyphenethylamine; N-Hydroxy-2C-T-2; N-OH-2C-T-2
- Routes of administration: Oral
- Drug class: Serotonergic psychedelic; Hallucinogen
- ATC code: None

Pharmacokinetic data
- Metabolites: Possibly 2C-T-2
- Onset of action: 30–40 minutes Peak: 2 hours
- Duration of action: 6–10 hours

Identifiers
- IUPAC name: 2-[4-(ethylsulfanyl)-2,5-dimethoxyphenyl]-N-hydroxyethan-1-amine
- CAS Number: 207740-38-3
- PubChem CID: 44350142
- ChemSpider: 21106320
- UNII: A9AD8C69LQ
- ChEMBL: ChEMBL127595
- CompTox Dashboard (EPA): DTXSID00658383

Chemical and physical data
- Formula: C_{12}H_{19}NO_{3}S
- Molar mass: 257.35 g·mol^{−1}
- 3D model (JSmol): Interactive image
- Melting point: 122 °C (252 °F)
- SMILES: CCSc1cc(OC)c(cc1OC)CCNO
- InChI: InChI=1S/C12H19NO3S/c1-4-17-12-8-10(15-2)9(5-6-13-14)7-11(12)16-3/h7-8,13-14H,4-6H2,1-3H3; Key:XGFJCRNRWOXGQM-UHFFFAOYSA-N

HOT-2, also known as 4-ethylthio-2,5-dimethoxy-N-hydroxyphenethylamine or as N-hydroxy-2C-T-2, is a psychedelic drug of the phenethylamine, 2C, and HOT-x families. It is the N-hydroxy derivative of 2C-T-2. The drug is taken orally.

== Use and effects ==
In his book PiHKAL (Phenethylamines I Have Known and Loved), Alexander Shulgin lists HOT-2's dose range as 10 to 18 mg orally and its duration as 6 to 10 hours. The drug's onset is 30 to 40 minutes and peak effects occur after 2 hours. HOT-2's properties are very similar to those of 2C-T-2, which has a dose of 12 to 25 mg orally, a duration of 6 to 8 hours, and an onset of less than 1 hour with a time to peak of 1 to 2 hours. HOT-2 may act as a prodrug of 2C-T-2.

The effects of HOT-2 have been reported to include some psychedelic visuals like perceptual movement, flowing, and shimmering, increased energy, euphoria, uncomfortableness, easier or more difficult communication, some difficulty concentrating and mental confusion, increased heart rate and blood pressure, and no body load. Shulgin said of HOT-2 that it "seems to be a well tolerated, and generally pleasant material, with a mixture of sensory as well as insightful aspects. Something for everyone."

== Chemistry ==
=== Synthesis ===
The chemical synthesis of HOT-2 has been described.

=== Analogues ===
Analogues of HOT-2 include 2C-T-2, HOT-7 (N-hydroxy-2C-T-7), and HOT-17 (N-hydroxy-2C-T-17), among others.

== History ==
HOT-2 was first described in the literature by Alexander Shulgin in his 1991 book PiHKAL (Phenethylamines I Have Known and Loved).

== Society and culture ==
=== Legal status ===
==== Canada ====
HOT-2 is a controlled substance in Canada under phenethylamine blanket-ban language.

==== United Kingdom ====
This substance is a Class A drug in the Drugs controlled by the UK Misuse of Drugs Act.

== See also ==
- HOT-x (psychedelics)
