= Methylenedioxycathinone =

Chemical compound

Clinical data
- Other names: MDC; MDCATH; Normethylone; N-Desmethylmethylone; Desmethylone; β-Keto-3,4-methylenedioxyamphetamine; β-Keto-MDA; βk-MDA; Nitrilone; Amylone
- Routes of administration: Oral, Insufflation, Rectal
- Drug class: Serotonin–norepinephrine–dopamine releasing agent (SNDRA)
- ATC code: None

Legal status
- Legal status: UK: Class B

Identifiers
- IUPAC name: (±)-2-amino-1-(3,4-methylenedioxyphenyl)propan-1-one
- CAS Number: 80535-73-5
- PubChem CID: 57465250
- ChemSpider: 25524469
- UNII: K0XHQ9FYT3
- CompTox Dashboard (EPA): DTXSID801029655

Chemical and physical data
- Formula: C_{10}H_{11}NO_{3}
- Molar mass: 193.202 g·mol^{−1}
- 3D model (JSmol): Interactive image
- SMILES: NC(C(=O)C1=CC2=C(C=C1)OCO2)C
- InChI: InChI=1S/C10H11NO3/c1-6(11)10(12)7-2-3-8-9(4-7)14-5-13-8/h2-4,6H,5,11H2,1H3; Key:XDEZOLVDJWWXRG-UHFFFAOYSA-N

3,4-Methylenedioxycathinone (MDC, MDCATH), also known as β-keto-3,4-methylenedioxyamphetamine (β-keto-MDA or βk-MDA), is an entactogen and stimulant drug of the phenethylamine, amphetamine, and cathinone families related to methylone (βk-MDMA or MDMC). It is the β-keto analogue of MDA.

Like methylone, MDC is a serotonin–norepinephrine–dopamine releasing agent (SNDRA). In contrast to MDA and MDMA, MDC shows no activity at the serotonin 5-HT_{2} receptors, but does retain much weaker affinity for the rodent trace amine-associated receptor 1 (TAAR1).

The drug was patented as an antidepressant and antiparkinsonian agent by Peyton Jacob III and Alexander Shulgin in 1996. MDC and other non-N-substituted cathinones such as cathinone itself are chemically unstable due rapidly forming biologically inactive dimers and this has limited their prevalence.

Monoamine release of MDC and related agents (EC_{50}, nM)
Compound	5-HT	NE	DA	Ref
Dextroamphetamine	698–1,765	6.6–7.2	5.8–24.8	
Dextromethamphetamine	736–1,292	12.3–13.8	8.5–24.5	
MDA	160–162	47–108	106–190	
MDMA	49.6–72	54.1–110	51.2–278	
Cathinone	6,100–7,595	23.6–25.6	34.8–83.1	
Methcathinone	2,592–5,853	22–26.1	12.5–49.9	
MDC	966	394	370	
Methylone (MDMC)	234–708	140–270	117–220	
Mephedrone	118.3–122	58–62.7	49.1–51	
Notes: The smaller the value, the more strongly the drug releases the neurotransmitter. The assays were done in rat brain synaptosomes and human potencies may be different. See also Monoamine releasing agent § Activity profiles for a larger table with more compounds. Refs:

== See also ==
- Substituted methylenedioxyphenethylamine
- Substituted cathinone
- 4-Methylcathinone
- 4-Methylmethcathinone
- Methylone
