= Α-Methyldopamine =

Chemical compound

α-Methyldopamine

Clinical data
- Other names: α-Me-DA; 3,4-Dihydroxyamphetamine; 3,4-DHA; HHA; 3,4-Dihydroxy-α-methylphenethylamine; 3,4-Dihydroxy-α-methyl-β-phenylethylamine; Methyldopamine; Catecholamphetamine
- ATC code: None

Identifiers
- IUPAC name: 4-(2-aminopropyl)benzene-1,2-diol
- CAS Number: 555-64-6
- PubChem CID: 17005
- ChemSpider: 16110
- UNII: XQ9A7WCY2L
- ChEBI: CHEBI:193722
- ChEMBL: ChEMBL28278
- CompTox Dashboard (EPA): DTXSID00897235

Chemical and physical data
- Formula: C_{9}H_{13}NO_{2}
- Molar mass: 167.208 g·mol^{−1}
- 3D model (JSmol): Interactive image
- SMILES: Oc1ccc(cc1O)CC(N)C
- InChI: InChI=1S/C9H13NO2/c1-6(10)4-7-2-3-8(11)9(12)5-7/h2-3,5-6,11-12H,4,10H2,1H3; Key:KSRGADMGIRTXAF-UHFFFAOYSA-N

α-Methyldopamine (α-Me-DA), also known as 3,4-dihydroxyamphetamine (3,4-DHA or HHA) or as catecholamphetamine, is a research chemical of the catecholamine and amphetamine families. It is a monoamine releasing agent and a metabolite of MDMA and MDA. The bis-glutathionyl metabolite of α-methyldopamine is slightly neurotoxic when directly injected into the brain's ventricles.

== Role in MDMA-induced serotonergic neurotoxicity ==
Interest in α-methyldopamine lies in the fact that 3,4-methylenedioxyamphetamine (MDA) and 3,4-methylenedioxy-N-methylamphetamine (MDMA) may not themselves be responsible for their serotonergic neurotoxicity, as an intracerebroventricular injection does not appear to cause neurotoxicity. While many studies suggest excitotoxicity or oxidative stress as likely mechanisms, which may be an effect of MDMA itself, this has led to the search for other mechanisms for the observed toxicity of serotonin axons and subsequent reduction in serotonin (5-HT) and 5-HIAA (its major metabolite in the body) in vivo following administration. A common theory follows that a metabolite of MDA and MDMA in the periphery must be responsible, and several have been cited as responsible. Although α-methyldopamine is widely cited as the source of this neurotoxicity in a number of lay sources, McCann, et al. (1991), demonstrated that the major metabolites α-methyldopamine and 3-O-methyl-α-methyldopamine (3-O-Me-α-MeDA or HMA) did not produce neurotoxicity.

It was first demonstrated, in 1978, by Conway et al. and possibly others that, while α-methyldopamine caused acute decreases in the levels of neuronal dopamine, in some areas of the brain in excess of 75%, levels returned to baseline within 12 hours, indicating that α-methyldopamine could not be responsible for the toxic effects observed.

However, the story complicates as α-methyldopamine readily oxidizes to the o-quinone and reacts with endogenous antioxidants in the body, such as glutathione (GSH). It was demonstrated by Miller et al. (1997), that 5-(glutathion-S-yl)-α-methyldopamine and 5-(N-acetylcystein-S-yl)-α-methyldopamine produced similar effects to the parent compound, but did not induce neurotoxicity when injected intracerebroventricularly. However, the derivative metabolite 2,5-bis-(glutathion-S-yl)-α-methyldopamine (injected at ~1.5 times the usual per-kg MDMA dose) did in fact induce neurotoxicity, providing initial evidence that this metabolite may be the source of neuronal toxicity following the administration of MDA and MDMA, and the subsequent reduction in serotonergic axons.

In spite of the above, there is also evidence that metabolites may not be involved in the neurotoxicity of MDMA or related drugs and that the neurotoxicity is intrinsic to their mechanism of action, specifically simultaneous induction of serotonin and dopamine release. Accordingly, while single injections of MDMA directly into the brain have not been found to produce neurotoxicity, slow infusions of MDMA into the brain over 1 hour do result in signs of neurotoxicity.

== Chemistry ==
α-Methyldopamine, also known as 3,4-dihydroxy-α-methylphenethylamine or as 3,4-dihydroxyamphetamine, is a substituted phenethylamine, catecholamine, and amphetamine derivative. It is the α-methylated or amphetamine analogue of dopamine (3,4-dihydroxyphenethylamine).

Analogues of α-methyldopamine include corbadrine (levonordefrin; α-methylnorepinephrine; 3,4,β-trihydroxyamphetamine), dioxifedrine (α-methylepinephrine; 3,4,β-trihydroxy-N-methylamphetamine), and hydroxyamphetamine (norpholedrine; α-methyltyramine; 4-hydroxyamphetamine)

== See also ==
- Substituted amphetamine
- 3,4-Dihydroxymethamphetamine (HHMA; α-methylepinine)
- 4-Hydroxy-3-methoxyamphetamine (HMA)
- 4-Hydroxy-3-methoxymethamphetamine (HMMA)
- 2,4,5-Trihydroxyamphetamine (THA)
- 2,4,5-Trihydroxymethamphetamine (THMA)
- 3,4-Dimethoxyamphetamine (DMA)
- 3,4-Dihydroxymethcathinone (HHMC)
- 4-Hydroxy-3-methoxymethcathinone (HMMC)
