= 4-Hydroxy-3-methoxyamphetamine =

MDMA metabolite

HMA

Clinical data
- Other names: HMA; 3-Methoxy-4-hydroxyamphetamine; MHA; 3-O-Methyl-α-methyldopamine
- Drug class: Serotonin–norepinephrine–dopamine releasing agent

Identifiers
- IUPAC name: 4-(2-aminopropyl)-2-methoxyphenol
- CAS Number: 13026-44-3
- PubChem CID: 197139
- ChemSpider: 170725
- UNII: UW5V6G007J
- ChEBI: CHEBI:173516
- ChEMBL: ChEMBL1347

Chemical and physical data
- Formula: C_{10}H_{15}NO_{2}
- Molar mass: 181.235 g·mol^{−1}
- 3D model (JSmol): Interactive image
- SMILES: CC(CC1=CC(=C(C=C1)O)OC)N
- InChI: InChI=1S/C10H15NO2/c1-7(11)5-8-3-4-9(12)10(6-8)13-2/h3-4,6-7,12H,5,11H2,1-2H3; Key:GPBOYXOSSQEJBH-UHFFFAOYSA-N

4-Hydroxy-3-methoxyamphetamine (HMA), also known as 3-O-methyl-α-methyldopamine, is an active metabolite of 3,4-methylenedioxymethamphetamine (MDMA). It is substantially less potent than MDMA or 3,4-methylenedioxyamphetamine (MDA) as a monoamine releasing agent in vitro. Nonetheless, HMA has been found to induce the release of serotonin, norepinephrine, and dopamine with EC_{50} values of 897 nM, 694 nM, and 1450–3423 nM, respectively, and hence acts as a lower-potency serotonin–norepinephrine–dopamine releasing agent (SNDRA). The predicted log P of HMA is 0.6.

== See also ==
- Substituted amphetamine
- 4-Hydroxy-3-methoxymethamphetamine (HMMA)
- 3-Hydroxy-4-methoxyamphetamine
- 3,4-Dihydroxyamphetamine (HHA; α-methyldopamine)
- 3,4-Dihydroxymethamphetamine (HHMA; α-methylepinine)
- 2,4,5-Trihydroxyamphetamine (THA)
- 2,4,5-Trihydroxymethamphetamine (THMA)
- 3,4-Dimethoxyamphetamine (DMA)
- 3,4-Dihydroxymethcathinone (HHMC)
- 4-Hydroxy-3-methoxymethcathinone (HMMC)
