= 4-Hydroxy-3-methoxymethamphetamine =

Chemical compound

HMMA

Clinical data
- Other names: HMMA; 4-Hydroxy-3-methoxy-N-methylamphetamine; 3-Methoxy-4-hydroxymethamphetamine; 3-Methoxy-4-hydroxy-N-methylamphetamine
- Drug class: Serotonin–norepinephrine–dopamine releasing agent

Identifiers
- IUPAC name: 2-methoxy-4-[2-(methylamino)propyl]phenol
- CAS Number: 117652-28-5
- PubChem CID: 3081137
- ChemSpider: 2338803
- UNII: RBY3J6H4JW
- CompTox Dashboard (EPA): DTXSID70922503

Chemical and physical data
- Formula: C_{11}H_{17}NO_{2}
- Molar mass: 195.262 g·mol^{−1}
- 3D model (JSmol): Interactive image
- SMILES: CC(CC1=CC(=C(C=C1)O)OC)NC
- InChI: InChI=1S/C11H17NO2/c1-8(12-2)6-9-4-5-10(13)11(7-9)14-3/h4-5,7-8,12-13H,6H2,1-3H3; Key:UVDWYWYWOMOEFX-UHFFFAOYSA-N

4-Hydroxy-3-methoxymethamphetamine (HMMA) is an active metabolite of 3,4-methylenedioxymethamphetamine (MDMA). It is a slightly more potent stimulant than MDMA in rodents. The drug is substantially less potent than MDMA as a monoamine releasing agent in vitro. Nonetheless, HMMA has been found to induce the release of serotonin, norepinephrine, and dopamine with EC_{50} values of 589 nM, 625 nM, and 607–2884 nM, respectively, and hence acts as a lower-potency serotonin–norepinephrine–dopamine releasing agent (SNDRA). The predicted log P of HMMA is 1.2.

== See also ==
- Substituted amphetamine
- 4-Hydroxy-3-methoxyamphetamine (HMA)
- 3,4-Dihydroxyamphetamine (HHA; α-methyldopamine)
- 3,4-Dihydroxymethamphetamine (HHMA; α-methylepinine)
- 2,4,5-Trihydroxyamphetamine (THA)
- 2,4,5-Trihydroxymethamphetamine (THMA)
- 3,4-Dihydroxymethcathinone (HHMC)
- 4-Hydroxy-3-methoxymethcathinone (HMMC)
