= Role of serotonin in visual orientation processing =

Serotonin (5-hydroxytryptamine) is a monoamine neurotransmitter that plays a role in mood, eating, sleeping, arousal and potentially visual orientation processing. To investigate its function in visual orientation, researchers have utilised MDMA, or as it is commonly referred to, Ecstasy (3,4-methylenedioxymethamphetamine). MDMA is known to affect serotonin neurons in the brain and cause neurotoxicity. Serotonin has been hypothesised to be involved in visual orientation because individuals who use MDMA exhibit an increase in the magnitude of the tilt aftereffect (TAE). The TAE is a visual illusion where viewing lines in one direction, for an extended period of time, produces the perception of a tilt in the opposite direction to vertical lines subsequently viewed. This effect is proposed to occur due to lateral inhibition to orientation sensitive neurons in the occipital lobe. Lateral inhibition is where neurons that become activated to a particular orientation send inhibitory signals to their neighbouring neurons. The degree of orientation that each neuron becomes maximally excited to is referred to as the tuning bandwidth. Lateral inhibition consequently plays a pivotal role in each neuron's tuning bandwidth, such that if lateral inhibition no longer occurs, a greater number of neurons will become stimulated to the same orientation. This results in the activated neurons becoming adapted to the same orientation stimulus, if the stimulus is viewed for a period of time. As a consequence, if those neurons are subsequently 'shown' another stimulus that differs slightly in its orientation, those neurons are no longer able to achieve the same level of response as compared to other non-adapted neurons.

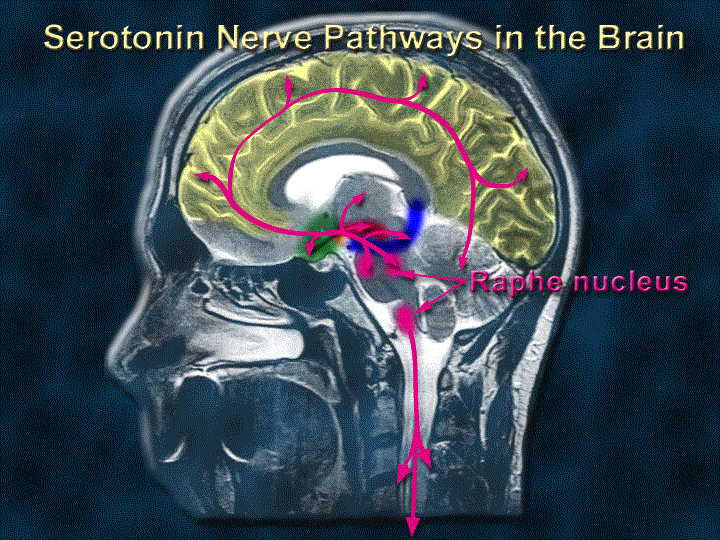
Serotonin nerve pathways in the brain

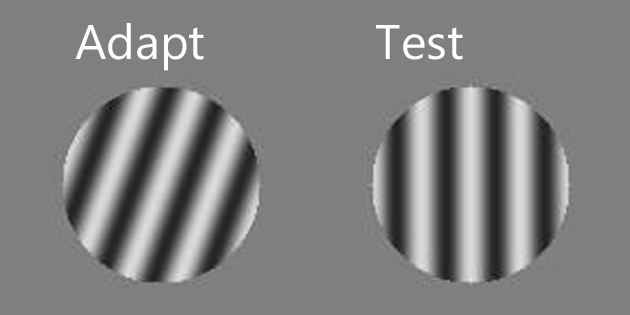
Example of the Tilt Aftereffect

Studies have consequently utilised the TAE to assess the degree of lateral inhibition that occurs from MDMA use. The results of these studies have found evidence to support the role that serotonin plays in visual orientation. This was evidenced through individuals who solely used MDMA reporting a greater magnitude of the TAE compared to drug naive controls. This increased magnitude showed that serotonin plays a role in lateral inhibition by potentially having a honing effect, meaning that orientation neurons become maximally excited to their preferred orientation, and less so to others. This additionally provides further evidence of the neurotoxicity of MDMA. This area of research, overall, has provided insights into the mechanisms of visual orientation processing and the effect that MDMA neurotoxicity has on this system. This furthers the understanding of both the role that serotonin has on the visual system and to what degree MDMA neurotoxicity affects the brain.

== History and Effect of MDMA ==
Ecstasy is the street name that refers to the popular recreational drug that contains 3,4-methylenedioxymethamphetamine (MDMA). The now frequently used drug in the rave and club scene was first synthesized by Merck, a German pharmaceutical company that was investigating the development of new medications in the early 1900s. Since its development, it has undergone various phases, from controversially being used as a therapeutic aid in the 1970s, to being banned in the 1980s after the Drug Enforcement Administration concluded that it was addictive. During and following the 1970s, however, MDMA became a popular recreational drug due to it producing feelings of euphoria, empathy, social closeness, mild hallucinations and stimulation. The popularized use of the drug amongst the general public has subsequently raised concerns as animal and human studies have shown that it has the ability to cause neurotoxicity to the brain.

MDMA is part of the amphetamine family and elicits its positive effects by altering brain serotonin, dopamine and norepinephrine neurotransmitter levels. As the drug begins to take effect, the brain becomes flooded with serotonin which can then become depleted within 3–6 hours following consumption. It has also been shown that an enzyme required to synthesize serotonin becomes deactivated, therefore, inhibiting the brain's replenishment of used serotonin. Due to changes that the brain undergoes during and following MDMA consumption, various consequences have been noted. These have included memory impairment, anxiety, paranoia, mood swings and depression. This has raised further concerns as to what extent MDMA may damage and change the brain's chemistry and what this means for its users.

== MDMA and Visual Orientation Processing ==
Recent research investigating MDMA has revealed the neurotoxic effect of the drug on brain serotonin neurons. Long term and potentially permanent changes to serotonergic axons have been noted in animal and primate studies where they were administered doses of MDMA similar to those taken by some human users. MDMA has subsequently been used to investigate the role that serotonin may play in visual orientation processing. Serotonin neurons are thought to reside in the occipital lobe, which is an area of the brain responsible for visual processing of line orientation, edges, motion and stereoscopic depth perception. Because MDMA is known to affect serotonin and that serotonin is thought to be involved in vision, individuals who take MDMA may exhibit differences in their visual orientation processing.

The relationship between the effect of MDMA and serotonin's role in visual orientation processing has been investigated following a prior study conducted in the 1990s by Maisini, Antonietti and Moja (1990). Their experiment involved subjects ingesting a mixture which significantly reduced brain serotonin levels. This reduction in serotonin resulted in an increase in the magnitude of the TAE in those subjects. This study has since been used as the foundation for the idea that MDMA neurotoxicity, due to its effect on serotonin neurons, could influence the magnitude of the TAE in individuals who use MDMA.

== Present Research ==
Current findings regarding altered visual orientation processing from MDMA use comes from research by White, Brown and Edwards (2013). Their study sought to extend the results found in previous research, such as Maisini et al. (1990), and investigate how MDMA affects visual processing in the occipital lobe. The participants of the study were divided into three groups: Ecstasy users who were amphetamine abstinent, Ecstasy users who also used amphetamines, and drug naive control participants. Ecstasy users who additionally used amphetamine were included as results from prior studies have indicated that concurrent amphetamine use may mediate the effects of MDMA on orientation neurons.

The results of the study indicated that the amphetamine abstinent Ecstasy group showed a broader tuning bandwidth than the controls. This demonstrates that MDMA use produces changes to serotonergic functioning as it disrupts lateral inhibition between orientation sensitive neurons. This disruption causes the neurons to activate to a wider range of orientations other than their preferred orientation. This finding, therefore, supports the idea that serotonin plays a role in sharpening the tuning bandwidths of orientation neurons. Overall, the results support the idea that "MDMA-mediated serotonin depletion can lead to broader orientation tuning bandwidths" p. 163. The authors do, however, go on to say that although deficits in certain tasks are present, the extent of these deficits requires further investigation.

A study by Brown, Edwards, McKone and Ward (2007), additionally investigated MDMA's effect on serotonin neurons. Their research also stemmed from Masini et al. (1990). They were interested in serotonin's role in lateral inhibition to orientation sensitive neurons and how MDMA use may change this system and produce wider tuning bandwidths. The study consisted of two groups, Ecstasy users and controls, who were shown brief displays of the TAE illusion. The results of the study support the idea that serotonin damage due to MDMA use causes lateral inhibition to diminish amongst orientation sensitive neurons in the occipital lobe. This was demonstrated by the Ecstasy group showing a greater increase in the magnitude of the TAE illusion compared to the controls. The authors stated that perhaps "serotonin is involved in the extent to which the sensitivity of neurons is reduced during adaptation" p. 445. It could be that the decrease in sensitivity of the post-adaptation orientation neurons is further diminished by decreased serotonergic functioning, which increases the magnitude of the TAE. Their research lends support to the idea that MDMA use affects lateral inhibition and that serotonin plays a role in visual orientation processing.
