= Anton Köllisch =

German chemist

Anton Köllisch (16 March 1888 – September 1916) was a German chemist who, while working in Darmstadt for pharmaceutical giant Merck, first described the synthesis of the chemical MDMA.

== Life and work ==
In 1911, Köllisch published his doctoral dissertation on the topic of indole synthesis from hydrazones under Otto Diels at the University of Berlin.

While at Merck, Dr Köllisch was involved in investigating syntheses for methylhydrastinine and hydrastinine. A procedural patent was filed on Christmas Eve 1912 relating to these syntheses, which mentioned MDMA without name as a chemical intermediate.

He was killed in the First World War.

== Bibliography ==
- Germany, Kaiserliches Patentamt, Patentschrift Nr 274350, http://mdma.net/merck/mdma-patent1.html
- Benzenhöfer, U; Passie, T (January 2006). "The early history of Ecstasy". Nervenarzt. 77 (1): 95–6, 98–9. doi:10.1007/s00115-005-2001-y. PMID 16397805.
- Adam, David. Truth about ecstasy's unlikely trip from lab to dance floor: Pharmaceutical company unravels drug's chequered past, Guardian Unlimited, 2006-08-18.
- Freudenmann, R. W.; et al. (September 2006). "The origin of MDMA (ecstasy) revisited: the true story reconstructed from the original documents" (PDF). Addiction. 101 (9): 1241–1245. doi:10.1111/j.1360-0443.2006.01511.x. PMID 16911722.
