= 2,4,5-Trihydroxyamphetamine =

Names
- Preferred IUPAC name 5-(2-Aminopropyl)benzene-1,2,4-triol
- Other names THA; THA-2; α-Methyl-6-hydroxydopamine; α-Me-6-OHDA; 2,4,5-TDM-TMA-2; 2,4,5-Tridesmethyl-TMA-2

Identifiers
CAS Number	136706-33-7
3D model (JSmol)	Interactive image
ChEMBL	ChEMBL28225
ChemSpider	112205
PubChem CID	126234
UNII	C6JI2489W2
CompTox Dashboard (EPA)	DTXSID90897244
- InChI: InChI=1S/C9H13NO3/c1-5(10)2-6-3-8(12)9(13)4-7(6)11/h3-5,11-13H,2,10H2,1H3 Key: FWNNQQDQXAMXMK-UHFFFAOYSA-N
- SMILES: CC(N)CC1=C(O)C=C(O)C(O)=C1

Properties
Chemical formula	C_{9}H_{13}NO_{3}
Molar mass	183.207 g·mol^{−1}
- Except where otherwise noted, data are given for materials in their standard state (at 25 °C [77 °F], 100 kPa). Infobox references

2,4,5-Trihydroxyamphetamine (THA or THA-2), also known as α-methyl-6-hydroxydopamine (α-Me-6-OHDA) or as 2,4,5-TDM-TMA-2, is a neurotoxin and a metabolite of MDMA related to 6-hydroxydopamine. It comes from the ring hydroxylation of 3,4-methylenedioxyamphetamine (MDA). The drug may also be a metabolite of 2,4,5-trimethoxyamphetamine (2,4,5-TMA; TMA-2) via O-demethylation. In one study, it was shown to reduce hippocampal tryptophan hydroxylase activity by 54% after short-term treatment. In another study, it was shown to significantly reduce striatal tyrosine hydroxylase activity. THA was studied clinically as an antihypertensive agent but was never marketed. The drug did not produce hallucinogenic effects in humans at doses of up to 200 mg orally.

== See also ==
- Monoaminergic neurotoxin
- 2,4,5-Trihydroxymethamphetamine (THMA)
- 3,4-Dihydroxyamphetamine (HHA; α-methyldopamine)
- 3,4-Dihydroxymethamphetamine (HHMA; α-methylepinine)
- 4-Hydroxy-3-methoxyamphetamine (HMA)
- 4-Hydroxy-3-methoxymethamphetamine (HMMA)
- 2,5-DDM-DOM (2,5-dihydroxy-4-methylamphetamine)
