= 2,4,5-Trihydroxymethamphetamine =

Names
- Preferred IUPAC name 5-[2-(Methylamino)propyl]benzene-1,2,4-triol
- Other names THMA; THM

Identifiers
| CAS Number | 136706-32-6 |
| 3D model (JSmol) | Interactive image |
| ChemSpider | 19983112 |
| PubChem CID | 131985 |
| UNII | K5ZT2JD76S |
| CompTox Dashboard (EPA) | DTXSID50897245 |
- InChI: InChI=1S/C10H15NO3/c1-6(11-2)3-7-4-9(13)10(14)5-8(7)12/h4-6,11-14H,3H2,1-2H3/t6-/m0/s1 Key: YTALUFDCWBLHNU-LURJTMIESA-N
- SMILES: CNC(C)CC1=C(O)C=C(O)C(O)=C1

Properties
| Chemical formula | C_{10}H_{15}NO_{3} |
| Molar mass | 197.234 g·mol^{−1} |
- Except where otherwise noted, data are given for materials in their standard state (at 25 °C [77 °F], 100 kPa). Infobox references

2,4,5-Trihydroxymethamphetamine (THMA-2 or THM) is a neurotoxin and a metabolite of MDMA. It has structural similarity to the dopamine neurotoxin 6-hydroxydopamine, and produces lasting serotonin deficits when administered centrally.

== See also ==
- 2,4,5-Trihydroxyamphetamine (THA)
- 3,4-Dihydroxyamphetamine (HHA; α-methyldopamine)
- 3,4-Dihydroxymethamphetamine (HHMA; α-methylepinine)
- 4-Hydroxy-3-methoxyamphetamine (HMA)
- 4-Hydroxy-3-methoxymethamphetamine (HMMA)
- Methyl-TMA-2 (N-methyl-2,4,5-trimethoxyamphetamine)
