= Methylone =

Entactogen drug

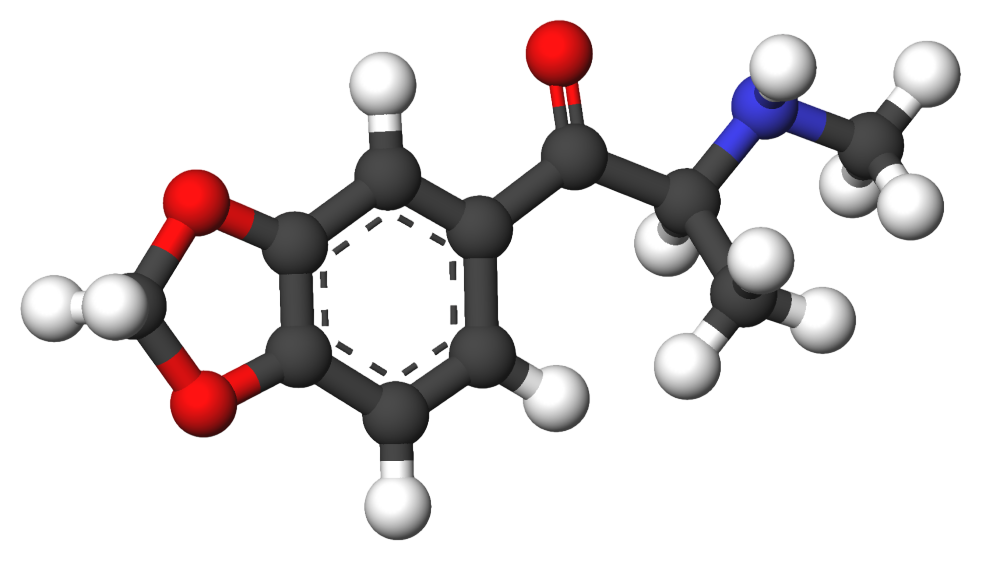

Clinical data
- Other names: 3,4-Methylenedioxy-N-methylcathinone; 3,4-Methylenedioxymethcathinone; MDMC; MDMCAT; β-Keto-MDMA; βk-MDMA; M1; TSND-201; TSND201; MeONE; EASE; EMM; Explosion
- Routes of administration: Common: oral, insufflation Uncommon: IV or IM injection, rectal
- Drug class: Serotonin–norepinephrine–dopamine releasing agent; Entactogen
- ATC code: None

Legal status
- Legal status: AU: S9 (Prohibited substance); BR: Class F2 (Prohibited psychotropics); CA: Schedule I; DE: Anlage II (Authorized trade only, not prescriptible); UK: Class B; US: Schedule I; UN: Schedule II; PL: I-P SE: Förteckning I

Pharmacokinetic data
- Metabolism: CYP2D6, CYP1A2, CYP2B6, and CYP2C19, COMT.
- Metabolites: Dihydromethylone; 3,4-dihydroxy-N-methylcathinone; Methylenedioxycathinone; 4-hydroxy-3-methoxy-N-methylcathinone; 3-hydroxy-4-methoxy-N-methylcathinone
- Onset of action: 0.5 hours
- Elimination half-life: 5.8–6.9 hours
- Duration of action: 2–3.5 hours

Identifiers
- IUPAC name: 1-(1,3-Benzodioxol-5-yl)-2-(methylamino)propan-1-one
- CAS Number: 186028-79-5 (racemic) 191916-41-3 (+)
- PubChem CID: 27281606
- ChemSpider: 21106350
- UNII: L4I4B1R01F
- KEGG: C20126
- CompTox Dashboard (EPA): DTXSID80870167

Chemical and physical data
- Formula: C_{11}H_{13}NO_{3}
- Molar mass: 207.229 g·mol^{−1}
- 3D model (JSmol): Interactive image
- Solubility in water: 357 mg/mL (20 °C)
- SMILES: CC(NC)C(=O)C1=CC=C(OCO2)C2=C1
- InChI: InChI=1S/C11H13NO3/c1-7(12-2)11(13)8-3-4-9-10(5-8)15-6-14-9/h3-5,7,12H,6H2,1-2H3; Key:VKEQBMCRQDSRET-UHFFFAOYSA-N

Methylone, also known as 3,4-methylenedioxy-N-methylcathinone (MDMC), is an entactogen and stimulant drug of the amphetamine, cathinone, and MDxx families related to 3,4-methylenedioxymethamphetamine (MDMA; "ecstasy"). It is the β-keto or cathinone analogue of MDMA. The drug is usually taken orally, but can also be administered by other routes.

It acts as a serotonin–norepinephrine–dopamine releasing agent (SNDRA). The drug has much less activity at the vesicular monoamine transporter 2 (VMAT2) than MDMA and may have less serotonergic neurotoxicity. In contrast to certain other entactogens like MDMA, methylone does not appear to be a significant agonist of the serotonin 5-HT_{2} receptors. Methylone is similar in its effects to MDMA, producing entactogenic effects and euphoria, but has a reputation of being gentler than MDMA and only lasts about half as long. Side effects of methylone include tachycardia, hangover, and insomnia. It may have reduced negative after-effects compared to MDMA. Methylone's onset is about 0.5 hours and its duration is about 2 to 3 hours.

Methylone was first synthesized by Peyton Jacob III and Alexander Shulgin in the mid-1990s and was first described in the literature in 1996. It was patented by Jacob and Shulgin as a potential antidepressant and antiparkinsonian agent, but was never developed or marketed for such uses. Methylone was encountered as a designer and recreational drug by 2004 and has become a controlled substance in many countries. Similarly to MDMA, it is being developed for the treatment of post-traumatic stress disorder (PTSD).

== Use and effects ==
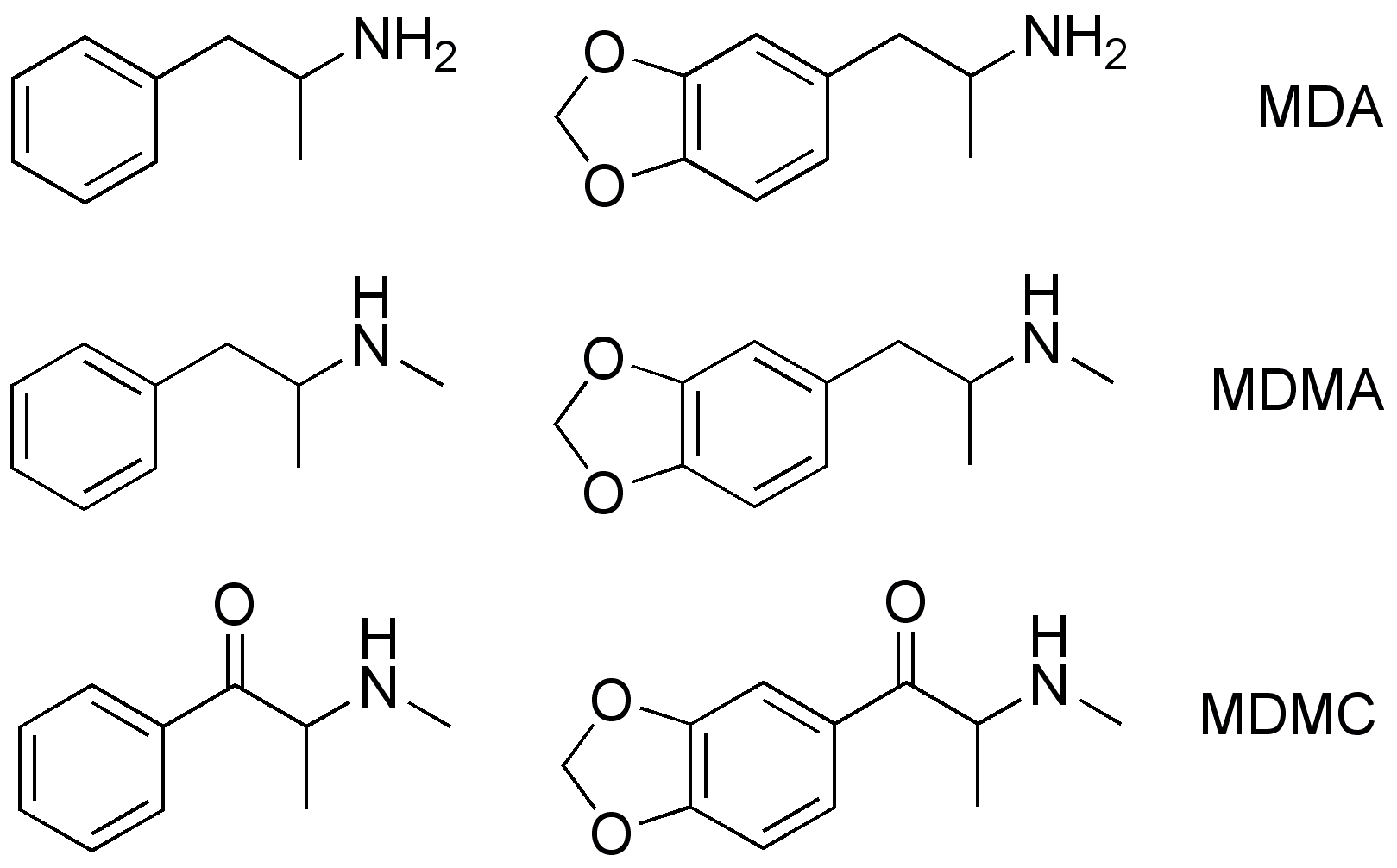
Structural similarities between some amphetamine-like stimulants and their 3,4-methylenedioxy- derivatives. Left: amphetamine, methamphetamine and methcathinone. Right: MDA, MDMA, and methylone.

Methylone substitutes for MDMA in drug discrimination tests in rodents. Methylone does not substitute for the stimulant amphetamine or for the hallucinogen DOM in animal drug discrimination tests. Further, also in common with MDMA, methylone acts on monoaminergic systems. In vitro, methylone has one third the potency of MDMA at inhibiting platelet serotonin accumulation and about the same in its inhibiting effects on the dopamine and noradrenaline transporters.

In spite of these behavioral and pharmacological similarities between methylone and MDMA, the observed subjective effects of both drugs are not completely identical. Alexander Shulgin wrote of the former:

"[Methylone] has almost the same potency of MDMA, but it does not produce the same effects. It has an almost antidepressant action, pleasant and positive, but not the unique magic of MDMA."

In acute pharmacological studies of methylone (50–300 mg) in humans, the drug produced physiological and psychological effects including increased blood pressure, heart rate, body temperature, pupil dilation, stimulation, euphoria, feelings of well-being, enhanced empathy, increased sociability, and altered perception. The studies found that the effects of methylone were similar to or milder than those of MDMA. Methylone had a faster onset of action and its subjective effects wore off sooner than MDMA, which might lead to a redosing pattern of use. The misuse potential of methylone, as measured by for instance drug liking responses, appeared to be similar to that of MDMA. However it also has less off-target effects than MDMA which may be an advantage for medical applications.

== Pharmacology ==
=== Pharmacodynamics ===
Methylone acts as a releasing agent and reuptake inhibitor of serotonin, norepinephrine, and dopamine. In comparison to MDMA, it has approximately 3-fold lower affinity for the serotonin transporter, while its affinity for the norepinephrine and dopamine transporters is similar. Notably, methylone's affinity for the vesicular monoamine transporter 2 (VMAT2) is about 13-fold lower than that of MDMA. The results of these differences in pharmacology relative to MDMA are that methylone is less potent in terms of dose, has more balanced catecholaminergic effects relative to serotonergic effects, and behaves more like a mixed releaser and reuptake inhibitor than a predominant releaser, though methylone still has relatively robust releasing capabilities.

In addition to its monoamine-releasing actions, similarly to MDMA, methylone is a variable-potency partial agonist of the serotonin 5-HT_{1A}, 5-HT_{1B}, and 5-HT_{1D} receptors. In contrast to MDMA however, methylone and its metabolites lack significant affinity for the serotonin 5-HT_{2A} and 5-HT_{2C} receptors and do not activate the serotonin 5-HT_{2B} receptor. On the other hand, a subsequent study found that methylone indeed showed no affinity for or agonistic activity at the serotonin 5-HT_{2A} and 5-HT_{2B} receptors, but was a potent and near-full agonist of the serotonin 5-HT_{2C} receptor Gα_{q} pathway, though not of the other assessed Gα pathways of the receptor. The absence of serotonin 5-HT_{2A} receptor agonism with methylone may explain its absence of psychedelic effects. The lack of serotonin 5-HT_{2B} receptor agonism with methylone may make it safer than MDMA, for instance in terms of long-term cardiac valvulopathy risk. Methylone is inactive at the mouse and rat trace amine-associated receptor 1 (TAAR1).

Similarly to MDMA, methylone does not produce the head-twitch response, a behavioral proxy of psychedelic effects, in rodents. On the other hand, it has been found to produce psychoplastogenic effects in preclinical research, and showed greater effects in this regard than MDMA.

Similarly to MDMA, methylone has been found to be a monoaminergic neurotoxin in animals. It has specifically been found to produce serotonergic and dopaminergic neurotoxicity in rodents. However, in one study, moderate doses of MDMA produced serotonergic neurotoxicity in rodents whereas methylone and mephedrone did not do so, suggesting that cathinones like methylone may be less neurotoxic than their corresponding amphetamine counterparts like MDMA.

Monoamine release of methylone and related agents (EC_{50}, nM)
Compound	5-HT	NE	DA	Ref
Dextroamphetamine	698–1,765	6.6–7.2	5.8–24.8	
Dextromethamphetamine	736–1,292	12.3–13.8	8.5–24.5	
MDA	160–162	47–108	106–190	
MDMA	49.6–72	54.1–110	51.2–278	
Cathinone	6,100–7,595	23.6–25.6	34.8–83.1	
Methcathinone	2,592–5,853	22–26.1	12.5–49.9	
MDC	966	394	370	
Methylone (MDMC)	234–708	140–270	117–220	
Mephedrone	118.3–122	58–62.7	49.1–51	
Notes: The smaller the value, the more strongly the drug releases the neurotransmitter. The assays were done in rat brain synaptosomes and human potencies may be different. See also Monoamine releasing agent § Activity profiles for a larger table with more compounds. Refs:

=== Pharmacokinetics ===
The two major metabolic pathways in mammals for methylone are N-demethylation to methylenedioxycathinone (MDC), and demethylation followed by O-methylation of the 3- or 4-hydroxy group to 4-hydroxy-3-methoxymethcathinone (HMMC) or 3-hydroxy-4-methoxymethcathinone (3-OH-4-MeO-MC). Another metabolite is 3,4-dihydroxymethcathinone (HHMC). When 5 mg/kg of methylone was administered to rats, it was found that around 26% was excreted as HMMC within the first 48 hours (less than 3% excreted unchanged). The mean elimination half-lives of methylone in humans following oral administration of doses of 50 to 200 mg ranged from 5.8 to 6.9 hours. The onset of action and duration of action of methylone in humans are 0.5 hours and 2.5 to 3.0 hours, respectively.

== Chemistry ==
Methylone is the substituted cathinone analogue of 3,4-methylenedioxymethamphetamine (MDMA) and the 3,4-methylenedioxy analogue of methcathinone. The only structural difference of methylone with respect to MDMA is the substitution of two hydrogen atoms by one oxygen atom in the β position of the phenethylamine core, forming a ketone group.

=== Synthesis ===
The chemical synthesis of methylone has been described.

== History ==
Methylone was first synthesized by Peyton Jacob III and Alexander Shulgin in the mid-1990s. This was after the publication of Shulgin's PiHKAL (1991), and so methylone is not included in this book. However, it was subsequently included in The Shulgin Index (2011). The drug was patented by Jacob and Shulgin as a potential antidepressant and antiparkinsonian agent, but was never developed or marketed. This was the first time that methylone was described in the literature. The drug was first described in the scientific literature by 1997. Methylone was encountered as a designer and recreational drug by 2004. It has become a controlled substance in many countries.

== Society and culture ==
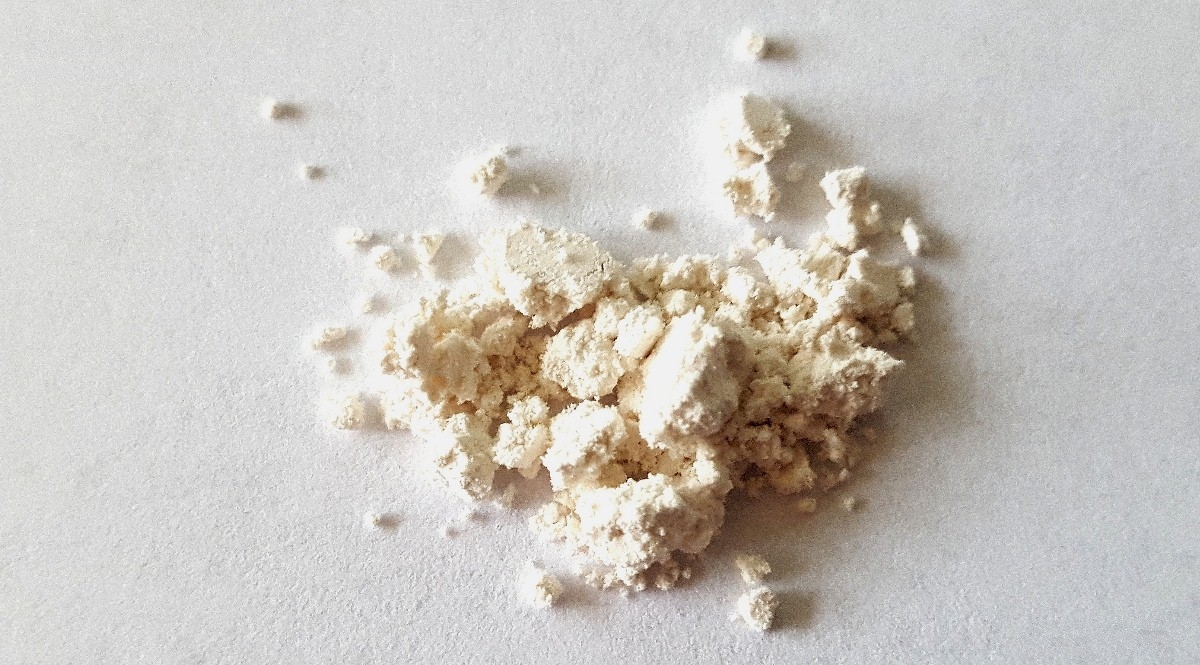
Methylone in powder form

=== Names and etymology ===
"Methylone" is also a trademarked brand name for an injectable form of methylprednisolone, a corticosteroid hormone used to treat arthritis and severe allergic reactions; hence, methylone may be confused with it. Aside from context, they can be distinguished by the fact that the name will usually be capitalized when referring to the prescription drug.

A proposed alternate name is βk-MDMA, or beta-keto-MDMA. While this nomenclature has not caught on because the name "methylone" became widely used before the conflicting Methylone trademark was noticed, the analogous names for related chemicals βk-MDEA and βk-MBDB have become the established names for those substances.

=== Commercial distribution ===
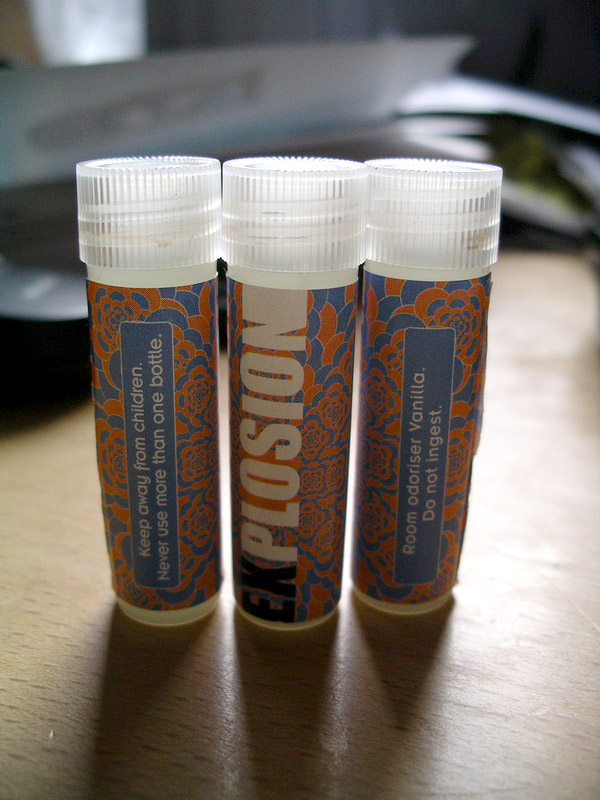
Bottles of Explosion

Analysis of "Explosion" has confirmed that the active ingredient is methylone. Many other formulations marketed as household chemicals, as well as the pure powder, have been sold.

=== Legal status ===
==== Netherlands ====
In the Netherlands, methylone is not yet listed under the Opium Law, but is covered under the medicine act. Because methylone is not registered officially, it is forbidden to trade in methylone. The Minister of Health has asked the Coordination point Assessment and Monitoring new drugs group (CAM) to gather information about this substance, resulting possibly in an official risk assessment. Until now, no research has been conducted on the toxicity of methylone, so nothing is known about the harmfulness of this new drug.

==== New Zealand ====
In New Zealand, although methylone is not explicitly scheduled and falls outside the strict definitions of an "amphetamine analogue" in the Misuse of Drugs Act, it is considered to be "substantially similar" to methcathinone and is thus considered by law enforcement authorities to be a Class C illegal drug. Methylone was sold in New Zealand for around 6 months from November 2005 to April 2006 as an MDMA substitute, under the name "Ease". The product was withdrawn after legal disputes with the government.

==== United Kingdom ====
In the United Kingdom, methylone is illegal since the 16/04/2010 revision of the misuse of drugs act. Before this it was not specifically mentioned in United Kingdom (U.K.) law as the β-ketone was not covered under the Misuse of Drugs Act. In March 2010, plans were announced to make methylone and other cathinones, Class B drugs, "within weeks". While delayed by dissatisfaction in the Advisory Council on the Misuse of Drugs, the revision was rushed through by the government with little regard for the views of the council. The importation of the compound was banned immediately.

==== Sweden ====
Sveriges riksdag added methylone to schedule I ("substances, plant materials and fungi which normally do not have medical use") as narcotics in Sweden as of Oct 1, 2010, published by Medical Products Agency in their regulation LVFS 2010:23 listed as Metylon, 2-metylamino-1-(3,4-metylendioxifenyl)propan-1-on. Methylone was first classified by Sveriges riksdags health ministry Statens folkhälsoinstitut as "health hazard" under the act Lagen om förbud mot vissa hälsofarliga varor (translated Act on the Prohibition of Certain Goods Dangerous to Health) as of Nov 1, 2005, in their regulation SFS 2005:733 listed as 3,4-metylendioximetkatinon (Metylon).

==== Canada ====
Although not listed as a Schedule 1 substance, Health Canada reports that methylone falls under the scheduling as an analogue of amphetamine. However, methylone bears the exact chemical difference between amphetamine and cathinone – and cathinone is listed as not being an analogue of amphetamine, possibly implying that methylone is unscheduled in Canada. The CDSA was updated as a result of the Safe Streets Act changing amphetamines from Schedule 3 to Schedule 1; however, methylone was not added.

==== United States ====
In October 2011, the DEA issued an emergency ban on methylone. It was made illegal to possess and distribute. On April 4, 2013, the DEA placed methylone as a Schedule 1 substance under the CSA.

- Arizona:

Effective February 16, 2012, methylenedioxymethcathinone (methylone) was classified as a dangerous drug, making it a felony to knowingly possess, use, possess for sale, manufacture, administer, transport for sale, import into the state, or offer to transport for sale or import into this state, sell, transfer or offer to sell or transfer. A.R.S. 13-3401(6)(c)(xliii), 2012 Ariz. Legis. Serv. Ch. 1 (H.B. 2356).

- Florida:

In January 2011, it was reported that Florida Attorney General Pam Bondi issued an emergency ban on MDPV, Methylone, Mephedrone, 3-methoxymethcathinone, 3-fluoromethcathinone, and 4-fluoromethcathinone as media attention on products labeled as "bath salts" grew. These chemicals are now Schedule I under Florida law.

- Louisiana:

In January 2011, Louisiana Governor Bobby Jindal emergency scheduled 3,4-methylenedioxymethcathinone (methylone), 3,4-methyenedioxypyrovalerone (MDPV), 4-methylmethcathinone (mephedrone), 4-methoxymethcathinone (methedrone), 4-fluoromethcathinone (flephedrone), and 3-fluoromethcathinone (3-FMC).

- Michigan:

Schedule 1 controlled substance in 2012.

- Tennessee:

On May 5, 2011, Tennessee Governor Bill Haslam signed a law making it a crime to knowingly produce, manufacture, distribute, sell, offer for sale or possess with intent produce, manufacture, distribute, sell, or offer for sale any product containing 3,4-methylenedioxymethcathinone (methylone), 3,4-methyenedioxypyrovalerone (MDPV), 4-methylmethcathinone (mephedrone), 4-methoxymethcathinone (methedrone), 4-fluoromethcathinone (flephedrone), and 3-fluoromethcathinone (3-FMC).

- Texas:

In September 2011, Texas added 3,4-methylenedioxy-N-methylcathinone to the Penalty Group 2 listing of the Health and Safety Code. Possession of a substance in penalty group 2 is a minimum of a state jail felony.

== Research ==
=== Post-traumatic stress disorder ===
Under the developmental code TSND-201, methylone is under development by Transcend Therapeutics for the treatment of post-traumatic stress disorder (PTSD). As of December 2025, it is in phase 2 clinical trials for this indication, and the FDA has granted Breakthrough Therapy designation. The efficacy and safety findings of a phase 2 trial have been published. In 2026, Otsuka Pharmaceutical and Transcend Therapeutics announced an agreement under which Otsuka is set to acquire Transcend for $700 million at closing. The deal includes up to $525 million in additional contingent consideration based on future sales milestones related to assets in development. In April 2026, the FDA issued a National Priority Voucher for the development of methylone for PTSD.

== See also ==
- Substituted methylenedioxyphenethylamine
- Substituted cathinone
