= 3,4-Dihydroxymethamphetamine =

MDMA metabolite

Clinical data
- Other names: HHMA; 3,4-DHMA; Di-OH-MA; α-Methylepinine; α,N-Dimethyldopamine; α-Methyl-N-methyldopamine; 3,4-Dihydroxy-N-methylamphetamine

Identifiers
- IUPAC name: 4-[2-(methylamino)propyl]benzene-1,2-diol
- CAS Number: 15398-87-5
- PubChem CID: 161126
- ChemSpider: 141547
- UNII: VFV03WN1VN
- CompTox Dashboard (EPA): DTXSID90934885

Chemical and physical data
- Formula: C_{10}H_{15}NO_{2}
- Molar mass: 181.235 g·mol^{−1}
- 3D model (JSmol): Interactive image
- SMILES: CC(CC1=CC(=C(C=C1)O)O)NC
- InChI: InChI=1S/C10H15NO2/c1-7(11-2)5-8-3-4-9(12)10(13)6-8/h3-4,6-7,11-13H,5H2,1-2H3; Key:NTCPGTZTPGFNOM-UHFFFAOYSA-N

3,4-Dihydroxymethamphetamine (HHMA, 3,4-DHMA), or 3,4-dihydroxy-N-methylamphetamine, also known as α-methylepinine or α,N-dimethyldopamine, is the major metabolite of 3,4-methylenedioxy-N-methylamphetamine (MDMA). It is formed from MDMA by O-demethylation via cytochrome P450 enzymes including CYP2D6 as well as CYP1A2 and CYP3A4. Like MDMA, HHMA is a monoamine releasing agent.

Along with 3,4-dihydroxyamphetamine (HHA; α-methyldopamine), HHMA may be involved in the serotonergic neurotoxicity of MDMA. However, findings in this regard are conflicting, and the neurotoxicity of MDMA and related agents may instead be based on their mechanism of action without involvement of metabolites.

== See also ==
- 3,4-Dihydroxyamphetamine (HHA; α-methyldopamine)
- 4-Hydroxy-3-methoxyamphetamine (HMA)
- 4-Hydroxy-3-methoxymethamphetamine (HMMA)
- 2,4,5-Trihydroxyamphetamine (THA)
- 2,4,5-Trihydroxymethamphetamine (THMA)
- 3,4-Dihydroxymethcathinone (HHMC)
- 4-Hydroxy-3-methoxymethcathinone (HMMC)
