= 4-Hydroxy-3-methoxymethcathinone =

Clinical data
- Other names: 4-Hydroxy-3-methoxymethcathinone; HMMC; 3-Methoxy-4-hydroxymethcathinone; Hydroxymethoxymethcathinone; 3-Methoxy-4-hydroxy-N-methylcathinone; 4-Hydroxy-3-methoxy-N-methylcathinone; 3MeO,4HO-MC; MHMC; Methylone-M1; 4′-Hydroxy-3′-methoxy-2-(isopropylamino)propanophenone

Identifiers
- IUPAC name: 1-(4-hydroxy-3-methoxyphenyl)-2-(methylamino)propan-1-one
- CAS Number: 916177-15-6
- PubChem CID: 71422851
- ChemSpider: 28552464
- UNII: FJ267O4DJ1
- CompTox Dashboard (EPA): DTXSID10841825

Chemical and physical data
- Formula: C_{11}H_{15}NO_{3}
- Molar mass: 209.245 g·mol^{−1}
- 3D model (JSmol): Interactive image
- SMILES: CC(C(=O)C1=CC(=C(C=C1)O)OC)NC
- InChI: InChI=1S/C11H15NO3/c1-7(12-2)11(14)8-4-5-9(13)10(6-8)15-3/h4-7,12-13H,1-3H3; Key:GIQCAMWUCKLMPC-UHFFFAOYSA-N

4-Hydroxy-3-methoxymethcathinone (HMMC), or 3-methoxy-4-hydroxy-N-methylcathinone, is a monoamine releasing agent of the amphetamine and cathinone families. It is an active metabolite of methylone (3,4-methylenedioxymethcathinone; MDMC). The drug is a very low-potency serotonin–norepinephrine–dopamine releasing agent (SNDRA), with EC_{50} values of 7,210 nM for serotonin, 6,340 nM for norepinephrine, and 5,840 nM for dopamine in rat brain synaptosomes. HMMC was first described in the scientific literature by 2011.

== See also ==
- 3,4-Dihydroxymethcathinone (HHMC; 3,4-DHMC)
- 4-Hydroxy-3-methoxyamphetamine (HMA)
- 4-Hydroxy-3-methoxymethamphetamine (HMMA)
- α-Methyldopamine (3,4-dihydroxyamphetamine; HHA; 3,4-DHA)
- α-Methylepinine (3,4-dihydroxymethamphetamine; HHMA, 3,4-DHMA)
