= 3,4-Dihydroxymethcathinone =

Clinical data
- Other names: HHMC; Dihydroxymethcathinone; 3,4-Dihydroxy-N-methylcathinone; 3,4HO-MC; 3′,4′-Hydroxy-2-(methylamino)propanophenone
- Drug class: Norepinephrine–dopamine releasing agent

Identifiers
- IUPAC name: 1-(3,4-dihydroxyphenyl)-2-(methylamino)propan-1-one
- CAS Number: 22930-83-2
- PubChem CID: 13518666
- ChemSpider: 27284926
- UNII: RZR1W6RS9C

Chemical and physical data
- Formula: C_{10}H_{13}NO_{3}
- Molar mass: 195.218 g·mol^{−1}
- 3D model (JSmol): Interactive image
- SMILES: CC(C(=O)C1=CC(=C(C=C1)O)O)NC
- InChI: InChI=1S/C10H13NO3/c1-6(11-2)10(14)7-3-4-8(12)9(13)5-7/h3-6,11-13H,1-2H3; Key:NIRQIFAAAYJDGZ-UHFFFAOYSA-N

3,4-Dihydroxymethcathinone (HHMC), or 3,4-dihydroxy-N-methylcathinone, is a monoamine releasing agent of the amphetamine and cathinone families. It is an active metabolite of methylone (3,4-methylenedioxymethcathinone; MDMC). The drug is a norepinephrine–dopamine releasing agent (NDRA), with EC_{50} values of 110 nM for norepinephrine, 90 nM for dopamine, and 14,100 nM for serotonin in rat brain synaptosomes. HHMC was first described in the scientific literature by 2017.

== See also ==
- 4-Hydroxy-3-methoxymethcathinone (HMMC; 4-HO-3-MeO-MC)
- α-Methyldopamine (3,4-dihydroxyamphetamine; HHA; 3,4-DHA)
- α-Methylepinine (3,4-dihydroxymethamphetamine; HHMA, 3,4-DHMA)
- 4-Hydroxy-3-methoxyamphetamine (HMA)
- 4-Hydroxy-3-methoxymethamphetamine (HMMA)
